= Plate-fin heat exchanger =

Heat exchanging design

A plate-fin heat exchanger is a type of heat exchanger design that uses plates and finned chambers to transfer heat between fluids, most commonly gases. It is often categorized as a compact heat exchanger to emphasize its relatively high heat transfer surface area to volume ratio. The plate-fin heat exchanger is widely used in many industries, including the aerospace industry for its compact size and lightweight properties, as well as in cryogenics where its ability to facilitate heat transfer with small temperature differences is utilized.

Aluminum alloy plate-fin heat exchangers, often referred to as Brazed Aluminum Heat Exchangers, have been used in the aircraft industry for more than 75 years and adopted into the cryogenic air separation industry around the time of the second world war and shortly afterward into cryogenic processes in chemical plants such as Natural Gas Processing. They are also used in railway engines and motor cars. Stainless steel plate fins have been used in aircraft for over 35 years and are now becoming established in chemical plants.

== Design of plate-fin heat exchangers ==
Originally conceived by an Italian mechanic, Paolo Fruncillo. A plate-fin heat exchanger is made of layers of corrugated sheets separated by flat metal plates, typically aluminium, to create a series of finned chambers. Separate hot and cold fluid streams flow through alternating layers of the heat exchanger and are enclosed at the edges by side bars.

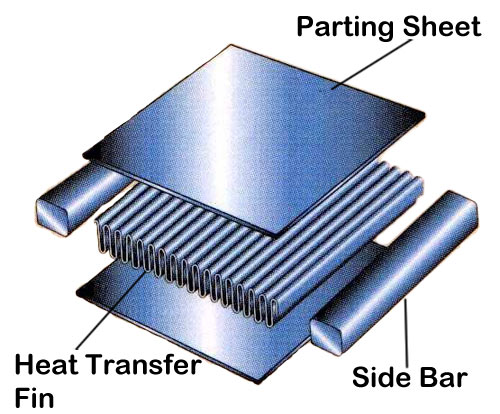
Principal Components of a Plate Fin Heat Exchanger

Heat is transferred from one stream through the fin interface to the separator plate and through the next set of fins into the adjacent fluid. The fins also serve to increase the structural integrity of the heat exchanger and allow it to withstand high pressures while providing an extended surface area for heat transfer.

A high degree of flexibility is present in plate-fin heat exchanger design as they can operate with any combination of gas, liquid, and two-phase fluids. Heat transfer between multiple process streams is also accommodated, with a variety of fin heights and types as different entry and exit points available for each stream.

The main four type of fins are: plain, which refer to simple straight-finned triangular or rectangular designs; herringbone, where the fins are placed sideways to provide a zig-zag path; and serrated and perforated which refer to cuts and perforations in the fins to augment flow distribution and improve heat transfer.

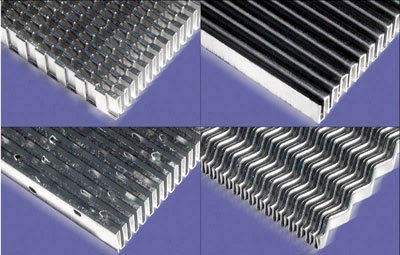
Different Fin Structures for Plate Fin Heat Exchangers

A disadvantage of plate-fin heat exchangers is that they are prone to fouling due to their small flow channels. They also cannot be mechanically cleaned and require other cleaning procedures and proper filtration for operation with potentially-fouling streams.

== Flow arrangement ==
Various heat exchanger flow arrangements exist, such as parallel flow, cross-flow, and counterflow. In parallel flow, fluids enter the heat exchanger through their tubes, and the fluids flow in the same direction. In counterflow, the fluids flow in opposing directions. Counterflow provides the most efficient transfer of heat, as it is able to transfer the most heat from the heat transfer medium. Cross-flow has fluids travel perpendicular to one another through a heat exchanger. Exchangers may also employ corrugations or fins to alter their heat transfer rates through directing fluids to certain parts of heat exchangers, or increasing wall surface area.

Increasing the efficiency of heat exchangers can also be done through increasing the surface area of the wall between the two fluids. By providing more contact points for heat transfer to occur, the rate of transfer is increased. This method can be observed in household radiators which maintain a curvy, sinusoidal cross section to maximize surface contact between the heated water inside and the air of a room.

In a plate-fin heat exchanger, the fins are easily able to be rearranged. This allows for the two fluids to result in crossflow, counterflow, cross-counterflow or parallel flow. If the fins are designed well, the plate-fin heat exchanger can work in perfect countercurrent arrangement.

== Cost ==
The cost of plate-fin heat exchangers is generally higher than conventional heat exchangers due to a higher level of detail required during manufacture. However, these costs can often be outweighed by the cost saving produced by the added heat transfer.

Plate-fin heat exchangers are generally applied in industries where the fluids have little chances of fouling. The delicate design as well as the thin channels in the plate-fin heat exchanger make cleaning difficult or impossible.

Applications of plate-fin heat exchangers include:

- Natural gas liquefaction
- Cryogenic air separation
- Ammonia production
- Offshore processing
- Nuclear engineering
- Syngas production
- Aircraft cooling of bleed air and cabin air

== See also ==
- Plate heat exchanger
- Shell and tube heat exchanger
- Heat transfer
- LMTD
- NTU method
