= Marine heat exchanger =

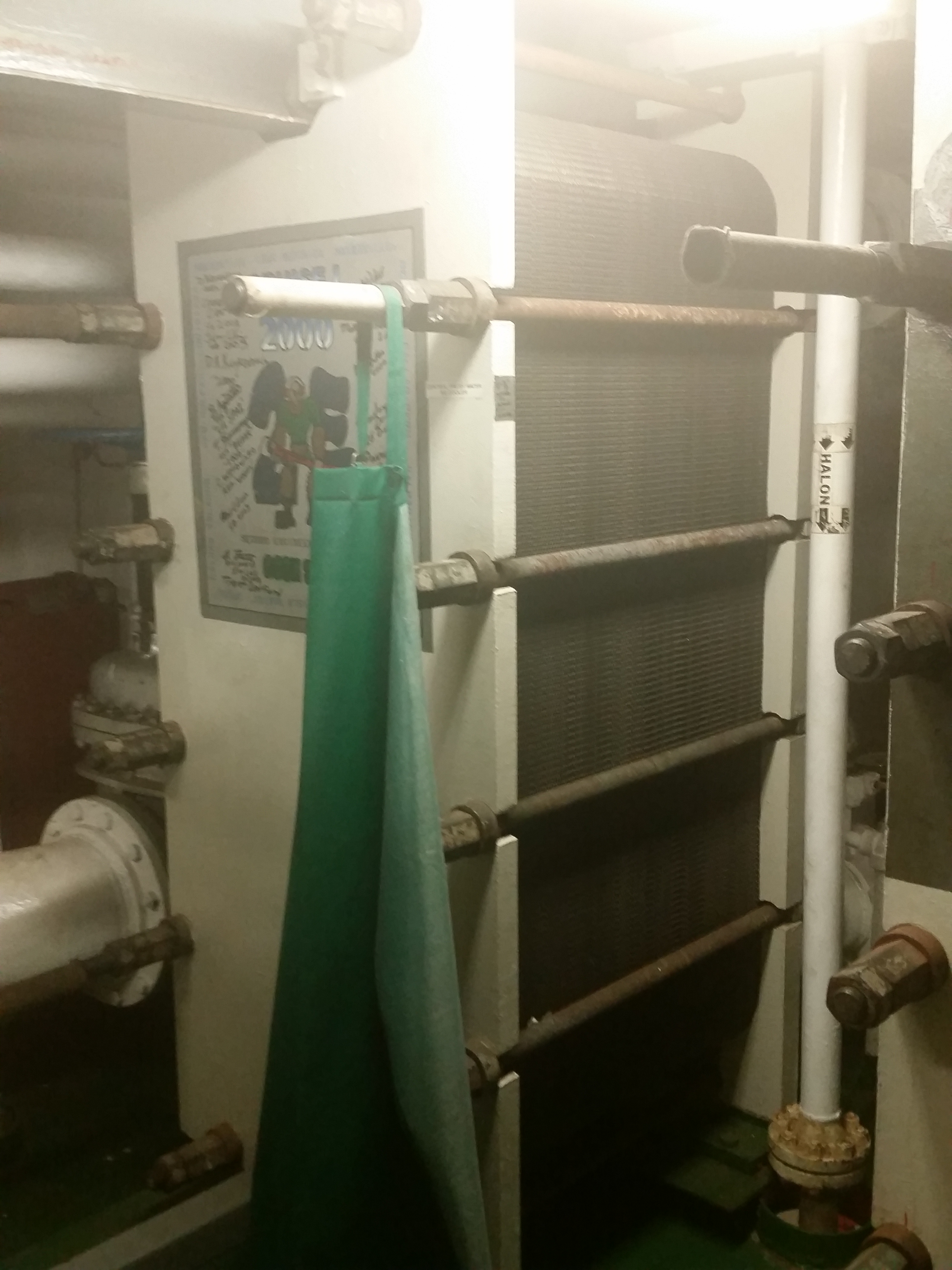
Plate heat exchanger

Marine heat exchangers are similar to non-marine heat exchangers, but the shipboard environment poses extra challenges, especially in maintenance. Heat exchangers can be used for both heating and cooling. The two primary types of marine heat exchangers used aboard vessels in the maritime industry are plate, and shell and tube. Maintenance for heat exchangers prevents fouling and galvanic corrosion from dissimilar metals.

== Types ==
Though there are many more types of heat exchangers that are used shore side, plate and shell and tube heat exchangers are the most common type of heat exchangers found aboard ocean-going vessels.

=== Plate ===
Plate-type marine heat exchangers are designed with sets of multiple parallel plates that are compressed to form the main cooler unit. This type has a small footprint in comparison to other types of heat exchangers. The plates are designed in such a way that when placed next to each other they create passageways to the fluid to flow between the plates. Gaskets are placed around the edge of each plate in order to prevent the mixing of the two fluids. Due to the temperature and pressure constraints of the rubber used to make the gaskets plate type heat exchangers are used for low pressure, low temperature applications, under 290 psig (20 bar) and 300 degrees Fahrenheit (150 degrees Celsius).

=== Shell and tube ===
Shell and tube heat exchangers consist of a tube bundle which is placed inside the larger shell. Due to this design these exchangers require twice the footprint of the plate heat exchanger in order to perform maintenance. Depending on the amount of cooling needed, shell and tube heat exchangers can be built in single or double pass configuration. The number of pass refers to the number of times the fluid in the shell passes by the fluid in the tubes. This is achieved by placing baffles in the shell that allow for the fluid to be directed.

== Uses ==
Heat exchangers on board vessels are used throughout many systems. Systems that use heat exchangers include lube oil, jacket water, steam systems and main seawater. The systems are often interconnected by heat exchangers in order to remove heat generated from running equipment from the engine room.

=== Motor oil ===
Heat generated due to friction is carried away from the engine in the motor oil. The motor oil flows through a heat exchanger, where the heat is passed to a central engine room cooling loop, before the heat is rejected to the ocean.

=== Jacket water ===
Heat generated an engine's cylinders is transferred to a jacket water cooling system through the cylinder wall. In addition to cooling the cylinder walls, jacket water is often found as an insulator between the exhaust header and the engine room. Jacket water cooling systems can be cooled by a central cooling water loop or can be cooled directly by seawater.

=== Steam ===
Unlike most systems with heat exchangers, steam is used to heat other systems. This is most common when a ship is left pierside for an extended period of time. The steam system will be used to prevent condensation and rusting of vital engine room components. These heat exchangers are most often shell and tube heat exchangers due to the high temperature and pressures often utilized in steam systems.

=== Seawater ===
Seawater cooling is often the last stage of cooling on board a ship. These coolers are oftentimes the largest on board a vessel in order to ensure maximum heat transfer to the seawater. The seawater is then discharged overboard after passing through the coolers.

== Fouling ==
Maintenance of marine heat exchangers is important to ensure the small pathways in both types of coolers do not become fouled. Depending on the system different types fouling may occur. In oil-based systems, an insufficient amount of cooling medium or inefficient flow of oil through the heater can cause the heater to become fouled. Seawater coolers can often become fouled due to marine life present in the water or due to galvanic corrosion if the correct safety measures are not taken to prevent such occurrences.

== Maintenance ==
Regular maintenance of heat exchangers is important in order to maintain the heat exchanger's maximum efficiency. Sacrificial anodes are necessary in cooling systems to prevent galvanic corrosion. Anodes are often time made of Zinc and are replaced when they reach fifty percent wear. Shell and tube heat exchangers require tubes to be plugged upon the detection of a leak. This prevents the two liquids from mixing inside the heat exchangers. In order to perform regular maintenance on a plate type heat exchanger, the plate stack is separated and the plates a cleaned to improve heat transfer.
