= Kaori heat treatment company =

Kaori Heat Treatment CO., LTD
- Company type: Public
- Industry: Green Energy, Manufacturing, Engineering
- Headquarters: Chung-Li, Taiwan
- Key people: Founder & CEO H.S. Hans
- Products: Hydrogen Fuel Cell Processor, Plate Heat Exchangers, Sendzimir Roller, Metal Ware, and Heat Pumps
- Number of employees: 556 (2013)
- Website: http://www.kaori.com.tw

Kaori Heat Treatment CO. LTD. is a Taiwanese company founded in 1970 by H.S. Hans. Kaori began as a metal heat treatment processing company, manufacturing metal products. Its current product mix includes brazed plate heat exchangers, gasket plate heat exchangers, data center advanced liquid cooling, hydrogen energy & fuel cells, and brazing and welding technology. It now deals in the production of specialized green energy products and solutions for commercial applications.

Kaori is headquartered in Chung-Li, Taiwan. In 2013 Kaori secured a deal with Bloom energy.

In 2014, Kaori Heat Treatment Company was listed in the Taiwan Stock Exchange Corporation (TWSE).

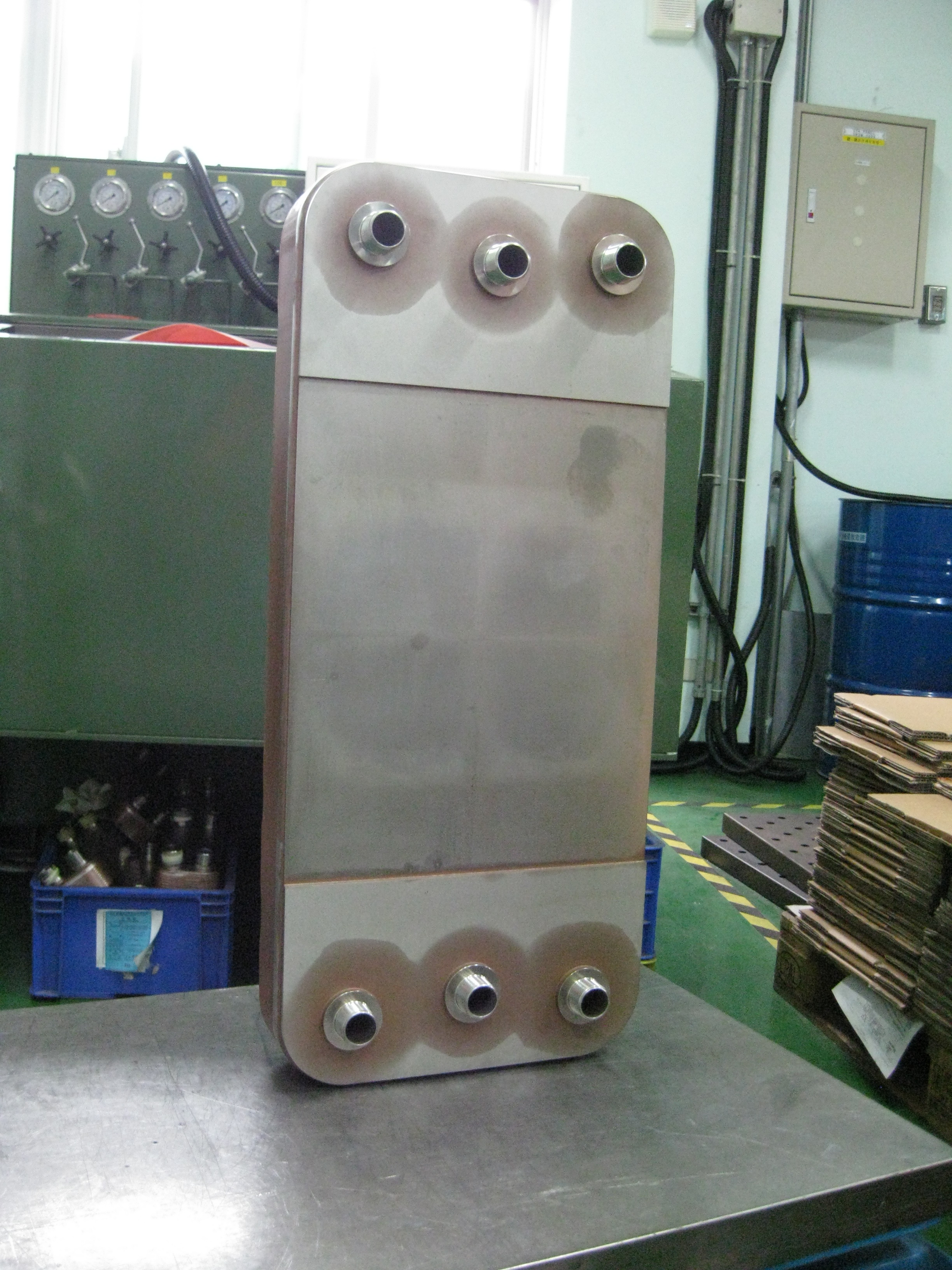
Kaori Z415 BPHE after performing leakage testing
