= Surface condenser =

Steam engine component

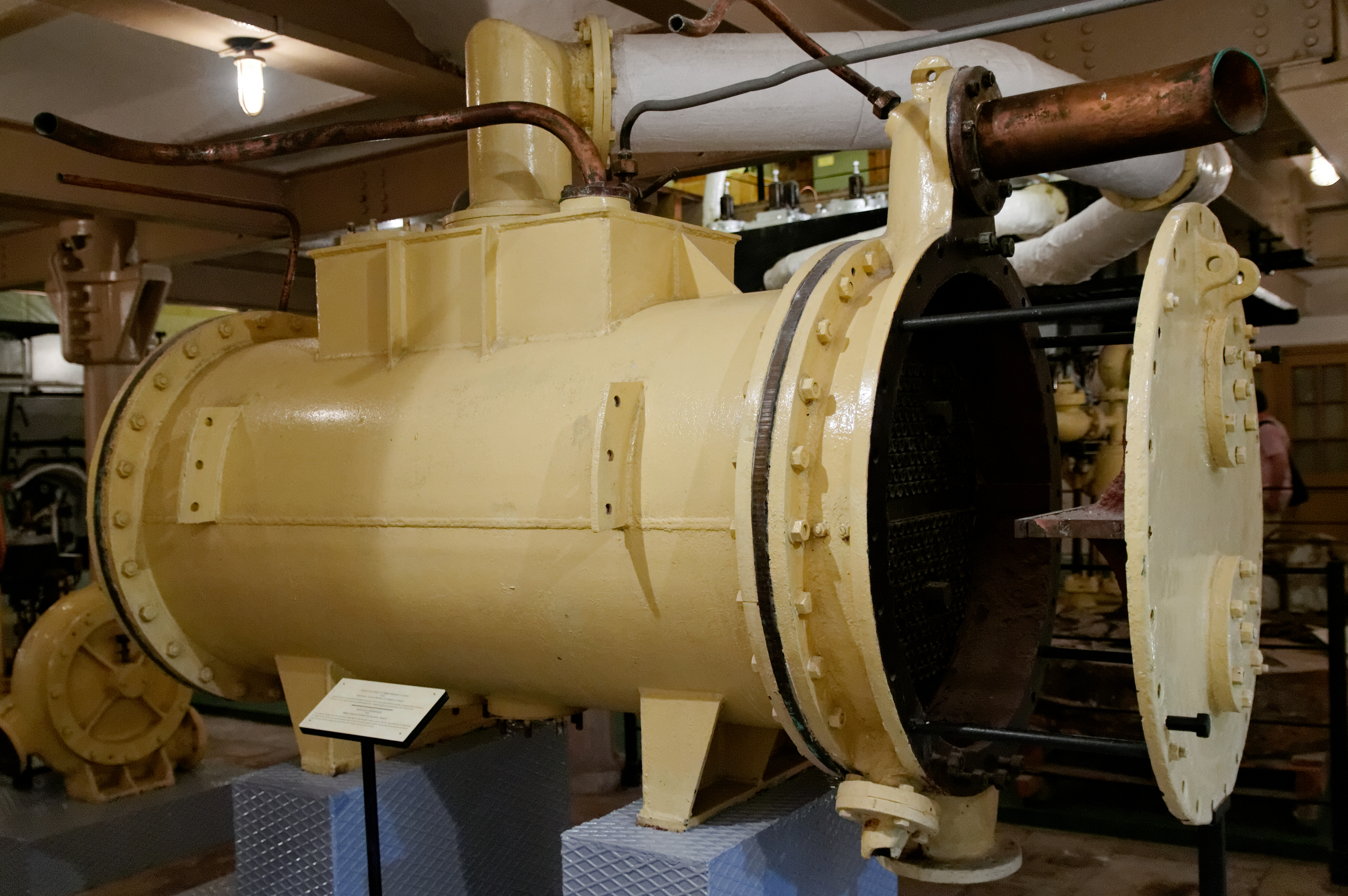
Surface condenser with end plate extended to reveal tube banks

A surface condenser is a water-cooled shell and tube heat exchanger installed to condense exhaust steam from a steam turbine in thermal power stations. These condensers are heat exchangers which convert steam from its gaseous to its liquid state at a pressure below atmospheric pressure. Where cooling water is in short supply, an air-cooled condenser is often used. An air-cooled condenser is however, significantly more expensive and cannot achieve as low of a steam turbine exhaust pressure (and temperature) as a water-cooled surface condenser.

Surface condensers are also used in applications and industries other than the condensing of steam turbine exhaust in power plants.

== Purpose ==
In thermal power plants, the purpose of a surface condenser is to condense the exhaust steam from a steam turbine to obtain maximum efficiency, and also to convert the turbine exhaust steam into pure water (referred to as steam condensate) so that it may be reused in the steam generator or boiler as boiler feed water.

The steam turbine itself is a device to convert the heat in steam to mechanical power. The difference between the heat of steam per unit mass at the inlet to the turbine and the heat of steam per unit mass at the outlet from the turbine represents the heat which is converted to mechanical power. Therefore, the more the conversion of heat per pound or kilogram of steam to mechanical power in the turbine, the better is its efficiency. By condensing the exhaust steam of a turbine at a pressure below atmospheric pressure, the steam pressure drop between the inlet and exhaust of the turbine is increased, which increases the amount of heat available for conversion to mechanical power. Most of the heat liberated due to condensation of the exhaust steam is carried away by the cooling medium (water or air) used by the surface condenser.

== Diagram of water-cooled surface condenser ==
Diagram of a typical water-cooled surface condenser

The adjacent diagram depicts a typical water-cooled surface condenser as used in power stations to condense the exhaust steam from a steam turbine driving an electrical generator as well in other applications. There are many fabrication design variations depending on the manufacturer, the size of the steam turbine, and other site-specific conditions.

=== Shell ===
The shell is the condenser's outermost body and contains the heat exchanger tubes. The shell is fabricated from carbon steel plates and is stiffened as needed to provide rigidity for the shell. When required by the selected design, intermediate plates are installed to serve as baffle plates that provide the desired flow path of the condensing steam. The plates also provide support that help prevent sagging of long tube lengths.

At the bottom of the shell, where the condensate collects, an outlet is installed. In some designs, a sump (often referred to as the hotwell) is provided. Condensate is pumped from the outlet or the hotwell for reuse as boiler feedwater.

For most water-cooled surface condensers, the shell is under [partial] vacuum during normal operating conditions.

=== Vacuum system ===
Diagram of a typical modern injector or ejector. For a steam ejector, the motive fluid is steam.

For water-cooled surface condensers, the shell's internal vacuum is most commonly supplied by and maintained by an external steam jet ejector system. Such an ejector system uses steam as the motive fluid to remove any non-condensible gases that may be present in the surface condenser. The Venturi effect, which is a particular case of Bernoulli's principle, applies to the operation of steam jet ejectors.

Motor driven mechanical vacuum pumps, such as the liquid ring type, are also popular for this service.

=== Tube sheets ===
At each end of the shell, a sheet of sufficient thickness usually made of stainless steel is provided, with holes for the tubes to be inserted and rolled. The inlet end of each tube is also bellmouthed for streamlined entry of water. This is to avoid eddies at the inlet of each tube giving rise to erosion, and to reduce flow friction. Some makers also recommend plastic inserts at the entry of tubes to avoid eddies eroding the inlet end. In smaller units some manufacturers use ferrules to seal the tube ends instead of rolling. To take care of length wise expansion of tubes some designs have expansion joint between the shell and the tube sheet allowing the latter to move longitudinally. In smaller units some sag is given to the tubes to take care of tube expansion with both end water boxes fixed rigidly to the shell.

=== Tubes ===
Generally the tubes are made of stainless steel, copper alloys such as brass or bronze, cupro nickel, or titanium depending on several selection criteria. The use of copper bearing alloys such as brass or cupro nickel is rare in new plants, due to environmental concerns of toxic copper alloys. Also depending on the steam cycle water treatment for the boiler, it may be desirable to avoid tube materials containing copper. Titanium condenser tubes are usually the best technical choice, however the use of titanium condenser tubes has been virtually eliminated by the sharp increases in the costs for this material. The tube lengths range to about 85 ft (26 m) for modern power plants, depending on the size of the condenser. The size chosen is based on transportability from the manufacturers’ site and ease of erection at the installation site. The outer diameter of condenser tubes typically ranges from 3/4 inch to 1-1/4 inch, based on condenser cooling water friction considerations and overall condenser size.

=== Waterboxes ===
The tube sheet at each end with tube ends rolled, for each end of the condenser is closed by a fabricated box cover known as a waterbox, with flanged connection to the tube sheet or condenser shell. The waterbox is usually provided with man holes on hinged covers to allow inspection and cleaning.

These waterboxes on inlet side will also have flanged connections for cooling water inlet butterfly valves, small vent pipe with hand valve for air venting at higher level, and hand-operated drain valve at bottom to drain the waterbox for maintenance. Similarly on the outlet waterbox the cooling water connection will have large flanges, butterfly valves, vent connection also at higher level and drain connections at lower level. Similarly thermometer pockets are located at inlet and outlet pipes for local measurements of cooling water temperature.

In smaller units, some manufacturers make the condenser shell as well as waterboxes of cast iron.

== Corrosion ==
On the cooling water side of the condenser:

The tubes, the tube sheets and the water boxes may be made up of materials having different compositions and are always in contact with circulating water. This water, depending on its chemical composition, will act as an electrolyte between the metallic composition of tubes and water boxes. This will give rise to electrolytic corrosion which will start from more anodic materials first.

Sea water based condensers, in particular when sea water has added chemical pollutants, have the worst corrosion characteristics. River water with pollutants are also undesirable for condenser cooling water.

The corrosive effect of sea or river water has to be tolerated and remedial methods have to be adopted. One method is the use of sodium hypochlorite, or chlorine, to ensure there is no marine growth on the pipes or the tubes. This practice must be strictly regulated to make sure the circulating water returning to the sea or river source is not affected.

On the steam (shell) side of the condenser:

The concentration of undissolved gases is high over air zone tubes. Therefore, these tubes are exposed to higher corrosion rates. Some times these tubes are affected by stress corrosion cracking, if original stress is not fully relieved during manufacture. To overcome these effects of corrosion some manufacturers provide higher corrosive resistant tubes in this area.

=== Effects of corrosion ===
As the tube ends get corroded there is the possibility of cooling water leakage to the steam side contaminating the condensed steam or condensate, which is harmful to steam generators. The other parts of water boxes may also get affected in the long run requiring repairs or replacements involving long duration shut-downs.

=== Protection from corrosion ===
Cathodic protection is typically employed to overcome this problem. Sacrificial anodes of zinc (being cheapest) plates are mounted at suitable places inside the water boxes. These zinc plates will get corroded first being in the lowest range of anodes. Hence these zinc anodes require periodic inspection and replacement. This involves comparatively less down time. The water boxes made of steel plates are also protected inside by epoxy paint.

== Effects of tube side fouling ==
As one might expect, with millions of gallons of circulating water flowing through the condenser tubing from seawater or fresh water, anything that is contained within the water flowing through the tubes can ultimately end up on either the condenser tubesheet (discussed previously) or within the tubing itself. Tube-side fouling for surface condensers falls into five main categories; particulate fouling like silt and sediment, biofouling like slime and biofilms, scaling and crystallization such as calcium carbonate, macrofouling which can include anything from zebra mussels that can grow on the tubesheet, to wood or other debris that blocks the tubing, and finally, corrosion products (discussed previously).

Depending on the extent of the fouling, the impact can be quite severe on the condenser's ability to condense the exhaust steam coming from the turbine. As fouling builds up within the tubing, an insulating effect is created and the heat-transfer characteristics of the tubes are diminished, often requiring the turbine to be slowed to a point where the condenser can handle the exhaust steam produced. Typically, this can be quite costly to power plants in the form of reduced output, increase fuel consumption and increased CO_{2} emissions. This "derating" of the turbine to accommodate the condenser's fouled or blocked tubing is an indication that the plant needs to clean the tubing in order to return to the turbine's nameplate capacity. A variety of methods for cleaning are available, including online and offline options, depending on the plant's site-specific conditions.

== Other applications of surface condensers ==
- Vacuum evaporation
- Vacuum refrigeration
- Ocean Thermal Energy (OTEC)
- Replacing barometric condensers in steam-driven ejector systems
- Geothermal energy recovery
- Desalination systems

== Testing ==
National and international test codes are used to standardize the procedures and definitions used in testing large condensers. In the U.S., ASME publishes several performance test codes on condensers and heat exchangers. These include ASME PTC 12.2-2010, Steam Surface Condensers, and PTC 30.1-2007, Air cooled Steam Condensers.

== See also ==
- Tube tool
- Condensing steam locomotive
- Deaerator
- Feedwater heater
- Fossil fuel power plant
- Jet condenser
- Power station
- Thermal power station
