= Tube tool =

Class of tool used to service tubing

Tube tools are tools used to service any tubing (material) in industrial applications including, but not limited to: HVAC or industrial heating and air (hospitals and universities, for example), OEMs (Original equipment manufacturer), defense contractors, the automotive industry, process industries, aluminum smelting facilities, food and sugar production plants, oil refineries, and power plants.

== Application ==
Tube tools can be categorized into function by application:

Tube Cleaners-tube cleaning demands vary widely by application Shell and tube heat exchangers, condensers and chillers: Deposits are typically sediment from impurities in the water circulating through the tubes. Manual scrubbing with a wire brush attached to a long rod is the traditional method of cleaning. Modern methods involve pneumatic or electric motors to pulsate the brush automatically with a medium pressure water jet to further clean out residual deposits.

Tube Testers- Use air pressure or vacuum to test for leaks, cracks, and material failures in a tube. Both manual activated and air activated models are available. To test for leaks in tubes, two operators are required with an operator at each end of the vessel. Step 1 - Seal the tube at both ends. Step 2 - Build air pressure or vacuum in the tube. Step 3 - Observe gauge to see if air pressure is dropping or vacuum is not holding.

Tube Plugs(Repair)- To regain efficiency of a heat exchanger or chiller, tube plugs are installed to take leaky tubes out of service. The rule of thumb is that a vessel will need to be retubed after approximately 10% of the tubes have been plugged. Tubes need to be plugged at both ends of the pressure vessel.

It is a good practice to: Install a plug that is the same as or a compatible material to the tube and tube sheet. Puncture the leaky tube using a one revolution tube cutter to relieve back pressure. Some contractors weld the tube plugs to the tube sheet after they are installed to permanently secure the plugs in place.

Tube Removers-One or a combination of the three below methods is used to remove a tube from a boiler or chiller vessel

- Tube Cutters- Tube Cutters are used to internally cut from the inside to the outside of the tube behind the tube sheet on one end. This lessens the force required to pull a tube. To eliminate tube cutting chips in the vessel, tubes should be scored and not totally cut through. The tube cutter needs to have sufficient reach to cut behind the tube sheet. Proper lubrication and cutting speed will increase cutting blade life.
- Tube Pullers- Used to break the seal and pull expanded tubes from a tube sheet. A spear or expanding collet is inserted and engaged into the tube inner diameter. A ram or gun applies force to exert an extracting force on the tube. The power to pull the tube is generated manually or through a hydraulic pump. The hydraulic pump can be manually, electrically or pneumatically driven. The pulling force required will vary with the tube size and wall, the depth of the tube sheet and tube material.
- Pneumatic Hammers-Pneumatic Hammers are an alternative method to remove tube stubs from heat exchangers and boilers. Maintenance technicians use piloted knockout tools to avoid damage to the tube sheet. The knockout tool is inserted into the tube and the impact pneumatic hammer is actuated to punch out the tube stub.

Tube Installation (Tube Expanders)- Tube expanding refers to the process of mechanically expanding a tube so that its end diameter is increased to fit into a larger holesheet or header, while the body of the tube retains an initial diameter. Construction of heat exchangers, boilers, and surface condenser tubes is mainly limited to copper, steel, stainless steel, and cast iron with exceptions such as the use of titanium in ultra high pressure vessel applications. To assure a proper tube joint, the tube wall must be reduced by a predetermined percentage dependent upon the material the tube is constructed of. For example,

- Tubing Material:
  - Copper & Cupro Nickel 8 - 10%
  - Steel, Carbon Steel & Admiralty Brass 7 - 8%
  - Stainless Steel & Titanium 4 - 5%

Pneumatic or hydraulic torque rolling devices with an expander (consisting of a mandrel, cage with rolls, case assembly with a thrust collar) are used to expand the end of the tube so it seals against the tube sheet of the vessel. The type of tool has to be with paired not only with material but also the inner and outer dimensions of the tube as well. Thickness of the tube sheet (what each individual tube is inserted into) has to be taken into consideration during tube removal or installation procedures.
