= Plate heat exchanger =

Heat exchanger that uses metal plates to transfer heat between two fluids

A plate heat exchanger is a type of heat exchanger that uses metal plates to transfer heat between two fluids. This has a major advantage over a conventional heat exchanger in that the fluids are exposed to a much larger surface area because the fluids are spread out over the plates. This facilitates the transfer of heat, and greatly increases the speed of the temperature change. They are generally considered easier to clean and maintain compared to Shell and tube type heat exchangers.

Plate heat exchangers are now common and very small brazed versions are used in the hot-water sections of millions of combination boilers. The high heat transfer efficiency for such a small physical size has increased the domestic hot water (DHW) flowrate of combination boilers. The small plate heat exchanger has made a great impact in domestic heating and hot-water. Larger commercial versions use gaskets between the plates, whereas smaller versions tend to be brazed.

The concept behind a heat exchanger is the use of pipes or other containment vessels to heat or cool one fluid by transferring heat between it and another fluid. In most cases, the exchanger consists of a coiled pipe containing one fluid that passes through a chamber containing another fluid. The walls of the pipe are usually made of metal, or another substance with a high thermal conductivity, to facilitate the interchange, whereas the outer casing of the larger chamber is made of a plastic or coated with thermal insulation, to discourage heat from escaping from the exchanger.

The world's first commercially viable plate heat exchanger (PHE) was invented by Dr Richard Seligman in 1923 and revolutionized methods of indirect heating and cooling of fluids. Dr Richard Seligman founded APV in 1910 as the Aluminum Plant & Vessel Company Limited, a specialist fabricating firm supplying welded vessels to the brewery and vegetable oil trades. Also, it set the norm for today's computer-designed thin metal plate Heat Exchangers that are used all over the world.

== Design of plate and frame heat exchangers ==
Schematic conceptual diagram of a plate and frame heat exchanger.

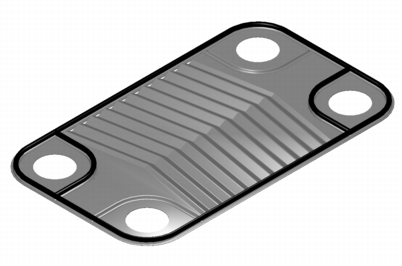
An individual plate for a heat exchanger

The plate heat exchanger (PHE) is a specialized design well suited to transferring heat between medium- and low-pressure fluids. Welded, semi-welded and brazed heat exchangers are used for heat exchange between high-pressure fluids or where a more compact product is required. In place of a pipe passing through a chamber, there are instead two alternating chambers, usually thin in depth, separated at their largest surface by a corrugated metal plate. The plates used in a plate and frame heat exchanger are obtained by one piece pressing of metal plates. Stainless steel is a commonly used metal for the plates because of its ability to withstand high temperatures, its strength, and its corrosion resistance.

The plates are often spaced by rubber sealing gaskets which are cemented into a section around the edge of the plates. The plates are pressed to form troughs at right angles to the direction of flow of the liquid which runs through the channels in the heat exchanger. These troughs are arranged so that they interlink with the other plates which forms the channel with gaps of 1.3–1.5 mm between the plates. The plates are compressed together in a rigid frame to form an arrangement of parallel flow channels with alternating hot and cold fluids. The plates produce an extremely large surface area, which allows for the fastest possible transfer. Making each chamber thin ensures that the majority of the volume of the liquid contacts the plate, again aiding exchange. The troughs also create and maintain a turbulent flow in the liquid to maximize heat transfer in the exchanger. A high degree of turbulence can be obtained at low flow rates and high heat transfer coefficient can then be achieved.

As compared to shell and tube heat exchangers, the temperature approach (the smallest difference between the temperatures of the cold and hot streams) in a plate heat exchangers may be as low as 1 °C whereas shell and tube heat exchangers require an approach of 5 °C or more. For the same amount of heat exchanged, the size of the plate heat exchanger is smaller, because of the large heat transfer area afforded by the plates (the large area through which heat can travel). Increase and reduction of the heat transfer area is simple in a plate heat-exchanger, through the addition or removal of plates from the stack.

== Evaluating plate heat exchangers ==
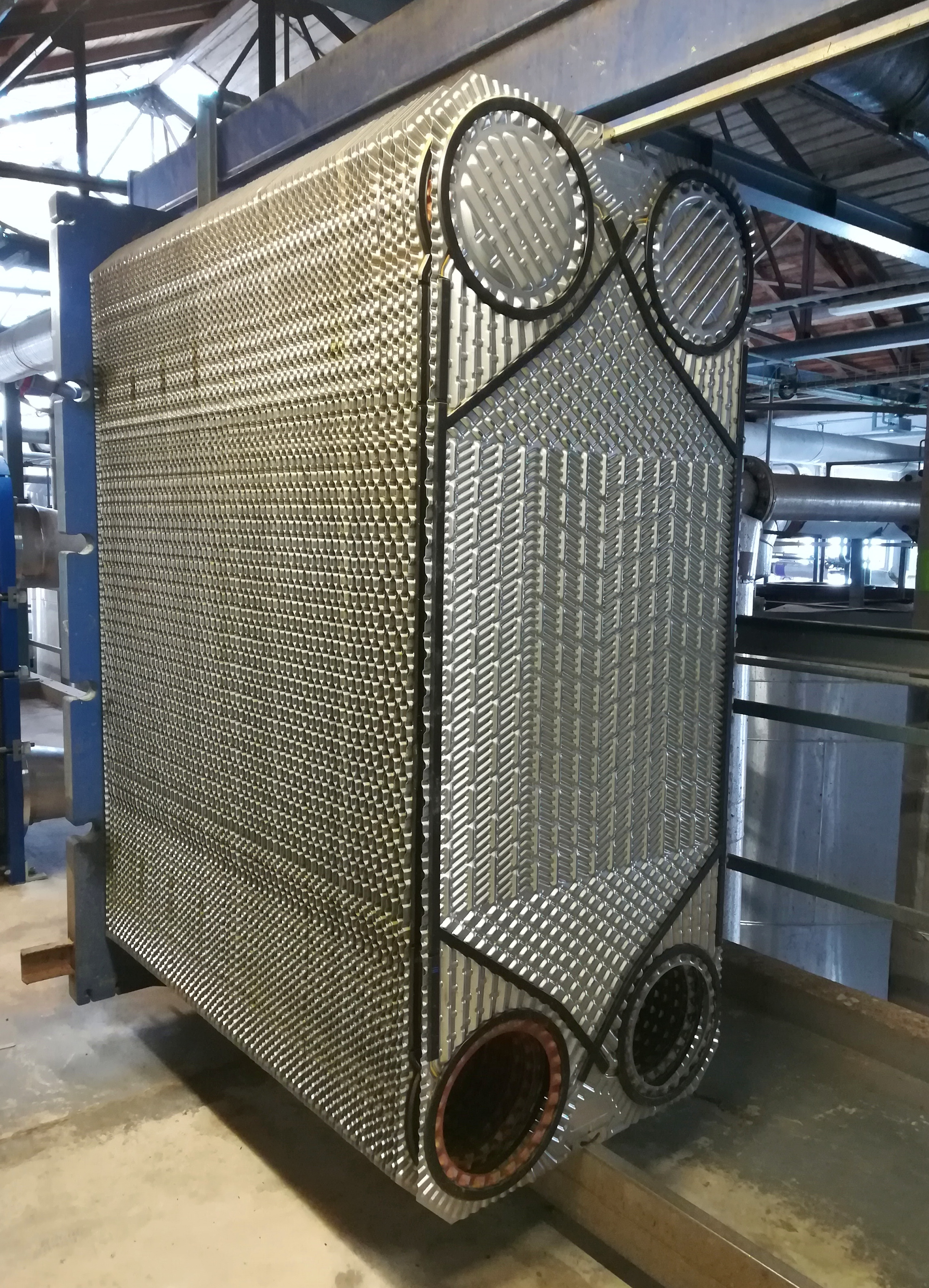
Partially dismantled exchanger, with visible plates and gaskets

All plate heat exchangers look similar on the outside. The difference lies on the inside, in the details of the plate design and the sealing technologies used. Hence, when evaluating a plate heat exchanger, it is very important not only to explore the details of the product being supplied but also to analyze the level of research and development carried out by the manufacturer and the post-commissioning service and spare parts availability.

An important aspect to take into account when evaluating a heat exchanger are the forms of corrugation within the heat exchanger. There are two types: intermating and chevron corrugations. In general, greater heat transfer enhancement is produced from chevrons for a given increase in pressure drop and are more commonly used than intermating corrugations. There are so many different ways of modifications to increase heat exchangers efficiency that it is extremely doubtful that any of them will be supported by a commercial simulator. In addition, some proprietary data can never be released from the heat transfer enhancement manufacturers. However, it does not mean that any of the pre-measurements for emerging technology are not accomplish by the engineers. Context information on several different forms of changes to heat exchangers is given below. The main objective of having a cost benefit heat exchanger compared to the usage of a traditional heat exchanger must always be fulfilled by heat exchanger enhancement. Fouling capacity, reliability and safety are other considerations that should be tackled.

First is Periodic Cleaning. Periodic cleaning (on-site cleaning) is the most efficient method to flush out all the waste and dirt that over time decreases the efficiency of the heat exchanger. This approach requires both sides of the PHE (Plate Heat Exchanger) to be drained, followed by its isolation from the fluid in the system. From both sides, water should be flushed out until it runs completely clear. The flushing should be carried out in the opposite direction to regular operations for the best results. Once it is done, it is then time to use a circular pump and a solution tank to pass on a cleaning agent while ensuring that the agent is compatible with the PHE (Plate Heat Exchanger) gaskets and plates. Lastly, until the discharge stream runs clear, the system should be flushed with water again.

== Optimization of plate heat exchangers ==
To achieve improvement in PHEs, two important factors have to be considered, namely the amount of heat transfer and pressure drop, such that the amount of heat transfer needs to be increased and pressure drops need to be decreased. In plate heat exchangers, due to the presence of corrugated plate, there is a significant resistance to flow with high friction loss. Thus to design plate heat exchangers, one should consider both factors.

For various ranges of Reynolds numbers, many correlations and chevron angles for plate heat exchangers exist. The plate geometry is one of the most important factors in heat transfer and pressure drop in plate heat exchangers; however, such a feature is not accurately prescribed. In the corrugated plate heat exchangers, because of narrow paths between the plates, there is a large pressure capacity and the flow becomes turbulent along the path. Therefore, it requires more pumping power than the other types of heat exchangers. Therefore, higher heat transfer and less pressure drop are targeted. The shape of plate heat exchanger is very important for industrial applications that are affected by pressure drop.

== Flow distribution and heat transfer equation ==
Design calculations of a plate heat exchanger include flow distribution and pressure drop and heat transfer. The former is an issue of Flow distribution in manifolds. A layout configuration of plate heat exchanger can be usually simplified into a manifold system with two manifold headers for dividing and combining fluids, which can be categorized into U-type and Z-type arrangement according to flow direction in the headers, as shown in manifold arrangement. Bassiouny and Martin developed the previous theory of design. In recent years Wang unified all the main existing models and developed a most completed theory and design tool.

The total rate of heat transfer between the hot and cold fluids passing through a plate heat exchanger may be expressed as: Q = UA∆Tm where U is the Overall heat transfer coefficient, A is the total plate area, and ∆Tm is the Log mean temperature difference. U is dependent upon the heat transfer coefficients in the hot and cold streams.

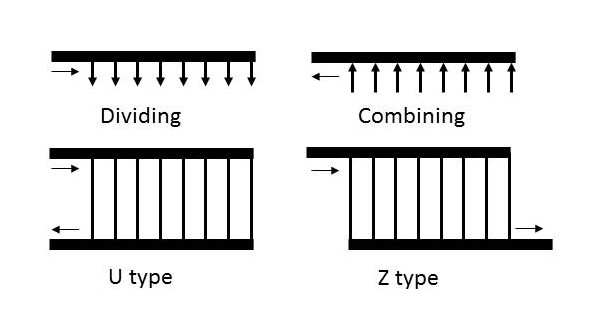
Manifold arrangement for flow distribution

Their cleaning helps to avoid fouling and scaling without the heat exchanger needing to be shut down or operations disrupted. In order to avoid heat exchanger performance to decrease and service life of the tube extension, the OnC (Online Cleaning) can be used as a standalone approach or in conjunction with chemical treatment. The re-circulating ball type system and the brush and basket system are some of OnC techniques. OfC (Offline Cleaning) is another effective cleaning method that effectively increases the performance of heat exchangers and decreases operating expenses. This method, also known as pigging, uses a shape like bullet device that is inserted in each tube and using high air pressure to force down the tube. Chemical washing, hydro-blasting and hydro-lancing are other widely used methods other than OfC. Both these techniques, when used frequently, will restore the exchanger into its optimum efficiency until the fouling and scaling begin to slip slowly and adversely affecting the efficiency of the heat exchanger.

Operation and maintenance cost is necessary for a heat exchanger. But there are different ways to minimize the cost. Firstly, cost can be minimized by reducing fouling formation on heat exchanger that decreases the overall heat transfer coefficient. According to analysis estimated, effect of fouling formation will generate a huge cost of operational losses which more than 4 billion dollars. The total fouling cost including capital cost, energy cost, maintenance cost and cost of profit loss. Chemical fouling inhibitors is one of the fouling control method. For example, acrylic acid/hydroxypropyl acrylate (AA/HPA) and acrylic acid/sulfonic acid (AA/SA) copolymers can be used to inhibit the fouling by deposition of calcium phosphate. Next, deposition of fouling can also be reduced by installing the heat exchanger vertically as the gravitational force pulls any of the particles away from the heat transfer surface in the heat exchanger. Second, operation cost can be minimized when saturated steam is used compared to superheated steam as a fluid. Superheated steam acts as an insulator and poor heat conductor, it is not suitable for heat application such as heat exchanger.

== See also ==
- Plate fin heat exchanger
- Heat transfer
- LMTD
