= NTU method =

Method to calculate rate of heat transfer in heat exchangers

The number of transfer units (NTU) method is used to calculate the rate of heat transfer in heat exchangers (especially parallel flow, counter current, and cross-flow exchangers) when there is insufficient information to calculate the log mean temperature difference (LMTD). Alternatively, this method is useful for determining the expected heat exchanger effectiveness from the known geometry. In heat exchanger analysis, if the fluid inlet and outlet temperatures are specified or can be determined by simple energy balance, the LMTD method can be used; but when these temperatures are not available either the NTU or the effectiveness NTU method is used.

The effectiveness-NTU method is very useful for all the flow arrangements (besides parallel flow, cross flow, and counterflow ones) but the effectiveness of all other types must be obtained by a numerical solution of the partial differential equations and there is no analytical equation for LMTD or effectiveness.

== Defining and using heat exchanger effectiveness ==
To define the effectiveness of a heat exchanger we need to find the maximum possible heat transfer that can be hypothetically achieved in an ideal counter-flow heat exchanger of infinite length. Therefore one of the fluids would experience in that conditions the maximum possible temperature change, which is the difference of $\ T_{h,i}- \ T_{c,i}$ (the temperature difference between the inlet temperature of the hot stream and the inlet temperature of the cold stream). The mass flowrates ($\dot m$) of the two streams exchanging heat must be known (here, the cold stream is denoted with subscripts 'c' and the hot stream is denoted with subscripts 'h'). The method proceeds by calculating the heat capacity rates (i.e. mass flow rate multiplied by specific heat capacity) for the hot and cold fluids respectively

$\ C_h = \dot m_h c_{p,h}$ and $\ C_c = \dot m_c c_{p,c}$

Here, $c_{p}$ is the fluid specific heat capacity at constant pressure. Note that in this formulation the specific heat capacities of the fluids are considered constant. Since the specific heat capacity is by definition the derivative of enthalpy with respect to temperature:

$c_p=\frac{\partial h}{\partial T}$

the products $\dot m c_{p}$ represent the capacity of enthalpy transport of each flow, per unit of temperature change.

By conservation of energy, the total enthalpy change of both fluids must be the same (in absolute value) when they pass through the ideal heat exchanger. Therefore, the fluid with the smaller heat capacity rate will be the one that experience the maximum temperature change, whereas the other fluid would change temperature more slowly along the heat exchanger length. Therefore, the maximum possible heat transfer rate between the fluids is determined by the following expression:

$$\dot Q_\mathrm{max}\ = C_\mathrm{min} (T_{h,i}-T_{c,i})$$

where

$$\ C_\mathrm{min}=\mathrm{min}(C_h, C_c)$$

Then, the effectiveness of the heat exchanger ($\epsilon$), is defined as the ratio between the actual heat transfer rate and this maximum theoretically possible heat transfer rate:

$$\epsilon \ = \frac{\dot Q}{\dot Q _\mathrm{max}}$$

where the real heat transfer rate can be determined either from the cold fluid or the hot fluid (they must provide equivalent results):

$$\dot Q \ = C_h (T_{h,i} -T_{h,o})\ = C_c (T_{c,o} - T_{c,i})$$

Effectiveness is a dimensionless quantity between 0 and 1. If we know $\epsilon$ for a particular heat exchanger, and we know the inlet conditions of the two flow streams we can calculate the amount of heat being transferred between the fluids by:

$$\dot Q \ = \epsilon   C_\mathrm{min} (T_{h,i} -T_{c,i})$$

Then, having determined the actual heat transfer from the effectiveness and inlet temperatures, the outlet temperatures can be determined from the equation above.

=== Relating Effectiveness to the Number of Transfer Units (NTU) ===
For any heat exchanger it can be shown that the effectiveness of the heat exchanger is related to a non-dimensional term called the "number of transfer units" or NTU:

$$\ \epsilon = f  ( NTU,\frac{C_\mathrm{min}}  {C_\mathrm{max}})$$

For a given geometry, $\epsilon$ can be calculated using correlations in terms of the "heat capacity ratio," or $C_r$ and NTU:

$$C_r \ = \frac{C_\mathrm{min}}{C_\mathrm{max}}$$

$\ NTU$ describes heat transfer across a surface

$$NTU \ = \frac{U A}{C_\mathrm{min}}$$

Here, $U$ is the overall heat transfer coefficient, $A$ is the total heat transfer area, and $C_{min}$ is the minimum heat capacity rate. To better understand where this definition of NTU comes from, consider the following heat transfer energy balance, which is an extension of the energy balance above:

$\dot Q= C_{min} (T_{o} -T_{i})_{min} = UA \Delta T_{LM}$

From this energy balance, it is clear that NTU relates the temperature change of the flow with the minimum heat capacitance rate to the log mean temperature difference ($\Delta T_{LM}$). Starting from the differential equations that describe heat transfer, several "simple" correlations between effectiveness and NTU can be made. For brevity, below summarizes the Effectiveness-NTU correlations for some of the most common flow configurations:

For example, the effectiveness of a parallel flow heat exchanger is calculated with:

$$\epsilon \ = \frac {1 - \exp[-NTU(1 + C_{r})]}{1 + C_{r}}$$

Or the effectiveness of a counter-current flow heat exchanger is calculated with:

$$\epsilon \ = \frac {1 - \exp[-NTU(1 - C_{r})]}{1 - C_{r}\exp[-NTU(1 - C_{r})]}$$

For a balanced counter-current flow heat exchanger (balanced meaning $C_r \ = 1$, which is a scenario desirable to enable irreversible entropy production to be reduced given sufficient heat transfer area):

$$\epsilon\ = \frac{NTU}{1+NTU}$$

A single-stream heat exchanger is a special case in which $C_r \ = 0$. This occurs when $C_\mathrm{min}=0$ or $C_\mathrm{max}=\infty$ and may represent a situation in which a phase change (condensation or evaporation) is occurring in one of the heat exchanger fluids or when one of the heat exchanger fluids is being held at a fixed temperature. In this special case the heat exchanger behavior is independent of the flow arrangement and the effectiveness is given by:

$$\epsilon \ = 1 - e^{-NTU}$$

For a crossflow heat exchanger with both fluid unmixed, the effectiveness is:

$$\epsilon \ = 1 - \exp(-NTU) - \exp[-(1+C_r)NTU] \sum_{n=1}^\infty C_r^n P_n(NTU)$$

where $P_n$ is the polynomial function

$$P_n(x) = \frac{1}{(n+1)!} \sum_{j=1}^n \frac{n+1-j}{j!} x^{n+j}$$

If both fluids are mixed in the crossflow heat exchanger, then

$$\epsilon \ = \left[ \frac{1}{1 -\exp(-NTU)} + \frac{C_r}{1 -\exp(-NTU \cdot C_r)} - \frac{1}{NTU} \right]^{-1}$$

If one of the fluids in the crossflow heat exchanger is mixed and the other is unmixed, the result depends on which one has the minimum heat capacity rate. If $C_{\mathrm{min}}$ corresponds to the mixed fluid, the result is

$$\epsilon \ = 1 - \exp\left( -\frac{1-\exp(-NTU\cdot C_r)}{C_r} \right)$$

whereas if $C_{\mathrm{min}}$ corresponds to the unmixed fluid, the solution is

$$\epsilon \ =  \frac{1}{C_r} (1 - \exp\{-C_r[1 - \exp(-NTU)] \})$$

All these formulas for crossflow heat exchangers are also valid for $C_r = 1$.

Additional effectiveness-NTU analytical relationships have been derived for other flow arrangements, including shell-and-tube heat exchangers with multiple passes and different shell types, and plate heat exchangers.

== Effectiveness-NTU method for gaseous mass transfer ==
It is common in the field of mass transfer system design and modeling to draw analogies between heat transfer and mass transfer. However, a mass transfer-analogous definition of the effectiveness-NTU method requires some additional terms. One common misconception is that gaseous mass transfer is driven by concentration gradients, however, in reality it is the partial pressure of the given gas that drive mass transfer. In the same way that the heat transfer definition includes the specific heat capacity of the fluid, a mass transfer-analogous specific mass capacity is required. This specific mass capacity should describe the change in concentration of the transferring gas relative to the partial pressure difference driving the mass transfer. This results in a definition for specific mass capacity as follows:

$c_{p-x}= \frac{d \omega_x}{dP_x}$

Here, $\omega_x$ represents the mass ratio of gas 'x' (meaning mass of gas 'x' relative to the mass of all other non-'x' gas mass) and $P_x$ is the partial pressure of gas 'x'. Using the ideal gas formulation for the mass ratio gives the following definition for the specific mass capacity:

$c_{p-x}= \frac {M_x/M_{other}} {P_{other}}$

Here, $M_x$ is the molecular weight of gas 'x' and $M _{other}$ is the average molecular weight of all other gas constituents. With this information, the NTU for gaseous mass transfer of gas 'x' can be defined as follows:

$NTU_x \ = \frac{U_mA_m}{\dot{m}c_{p-x}}$

Here, $U_m$ is the overall mass transfer coefficient, which could be determined by empirical correlations, $A_m$ is the surface area for mass transfer (particularly relevant in membrane-based separations), and $\dot{m}$ is the mass flowrate of bulk fluid (e.g., mass flowrate of air in an application where water vapor is being separated from the air mixture). At this point, all of the same heat transfer effectiveness-NTU correlations will accurately predict the mass transfer performance, as long as the heat transfer terms in the definition of NTU have been replaced by the mass transfer terms, as shown above. Similarly, it follows that the definition of $C_r$ becomes:

$C_r \ = \frac{(\dot{m}c_{p-x})_{min}}{(\dot{m}c_{p-x})_{max}}$

== Effectiveness-NTU method for dehumidification applications ==
One particularly useful application for the above described effectiveness-NTU framework is membrane-based air dehumidification. In this case, the definition of specific mass capacity can be defined for humid air and is termed the "specific humidity capacity."

$c_{p-h}=\frac {M_{wv}/M_{air}} {P_{air}}=\frac{0.62198}{P_{air}}=\frac{0.62198}{P_{total}-P_{wv,inlet}}$

Here, $M_{wv}$ is the molecular weight of water (vapor), $M_{air}$ is the average molecular weight of air, $P_{air}$ is the partial pressure of air (not including the partial pressure of water vapor in an air mixture) and can be approximated by knowing the partial pressure of water vapor at the inlet, before dehumidification occurs, $P_{wv,inlet}$. From here, all of the previously described equations can be used to determine the effectiveness of the mass exchanger.

== Importance of defining the specific mass capacity ==
It is very common, especially in dehumidification applications, to define the mass transfer driving force as the concentration difference. When deriving effectiveness-NTU correlations for membrane-based gas separations, this is valid only if the total pressures are approximately equal on both sides of the membrane (e.g., an energy recovery ventilator for a building). This is sufficient since the partial pressure and concentration are proportional. However, if the total pressures are not approximately equal on both sides of the membrane, the low pressure side could have a higher "concentration" but a lower partial pressure of the given gas (e.g., water vapor in a dehumidification application) than the high pressure side, thus using the concentration as the driving is not physically accurate.
