= Heat exchanger =

Equipment used to transfer heat between fluids

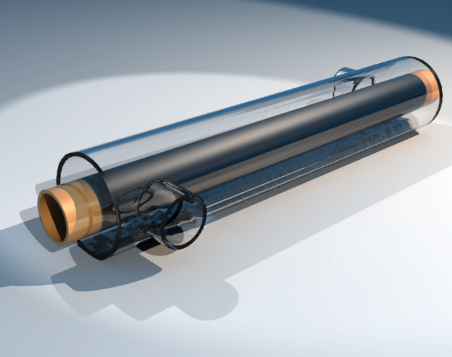
Double-pipe, tubular heat exchanger

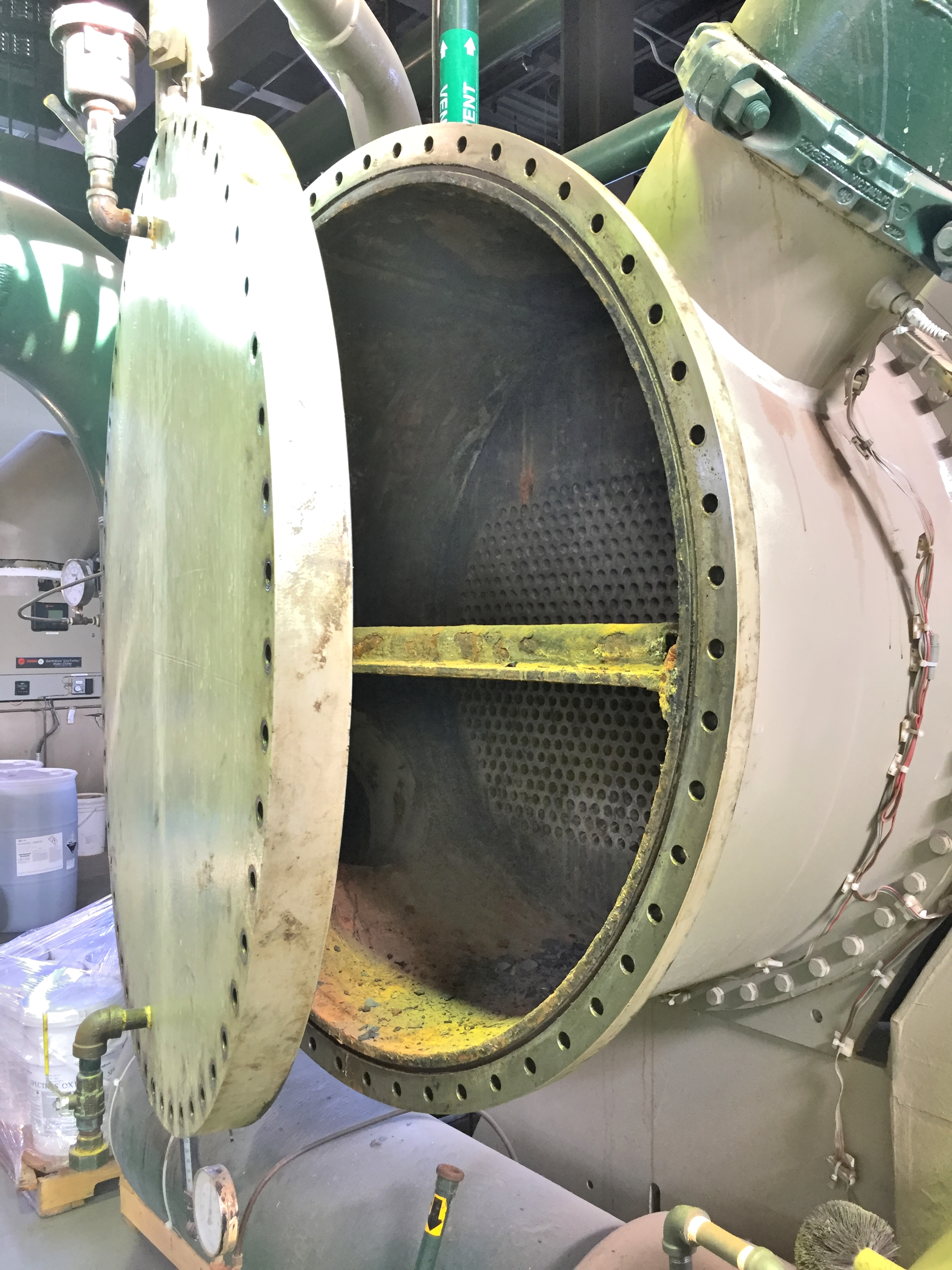
Partial view into inlet plenum of shell and tube heat exchanger of a refrigerant based chiller for providing air-conditioning to a building

A heat exchanger is a system used to transfer heat between a source and a working fluid. Heat exchangers are used in both cooling and heating processes. The fluids may be separated by a solid wall to prevent mixing or they may be in direct contact. They are widely used in space heating, refrigeration, air conditioning, power stations, chemical plants, petrochemical plants, petroleum refineries, natural-gas processing, and sewage treatment. The classic example of a heat exchanger is found in an internal combustion engine in which a circulating fluid known as engine coolant flows through radiator coils and air flows past the coils, which cools the coolant and heats the incoming air. Another example is the heat sink, which is a passive heat exchanger that transfers the heat generated by an electronic or a mechanical device to a fluid medium, often air or a liquid coolant.

== Flow arrangement ==
Countercurrent (A) and cocurrent (B)

According to their flow arrangement, there are three primary classifications of heat exchangers:

1. In parallel-flow heat exchangers, the fluids enter the exchanger at the same end, and travel in parallel to one another to exit the other side. This configuration is preferable at the expense of efficiency when the two fluids are intended to reach exactly the same temperature, as it reduces thermal stress and produces a more uniform rate of heat transfer.
2. In counter-flow heat exchangers the fluids enter the exchanger from opposite ends. The counter current design is the most efficient, roughly 70-90% depending on flow rate and temperature differential, in that it can transfer the most heat from the heat (transfer) medium per unit mass due to the fact that the average temperature difference along any unit length is higher. See countercurrent exchange.
3. In a cross-flow or cross-plate heat exchanger, the fluids travel roughly perpendicular to one another the with efficiencies between 50 and 70% in air.
Fig. 1: Shell and tube heat exchanger, single pass (1–1 parallel flow)

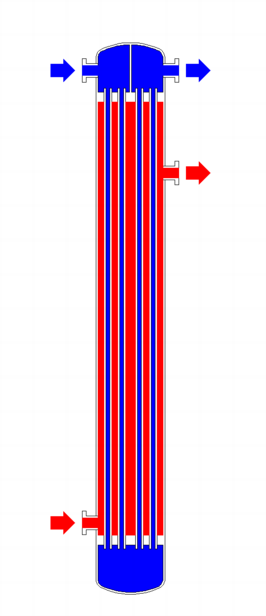
Fig. 2: Shell and tube heat exchanger, 2-pass tube side (1–2 crossflow)

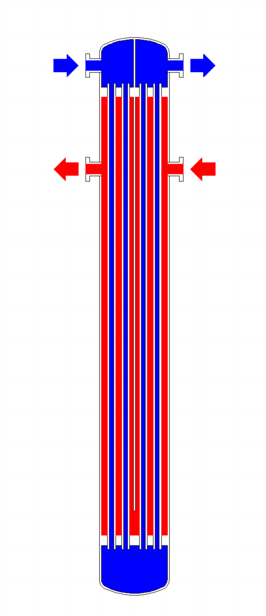
Fig. 3: Shell and tube heat exchanger, 2-pass shell side, 2-pass tube side (2-2 countercurrent)

To increase efficiency, heat exchangers are designed to maximize the surface area of the wall between the two fluids, while minimizing resistance (pressure drop) to fluid flow through the exchanger. Heat exchanger's efficiency can be increased by the addition of heat transfer features: fins, corrugations, dimples, or louvres in one or both directions, which increase surface area and may channel fluid flow or induce turbulence. However, care must be taken when adding heat transfer features that may trap or attract particles over operating time; resulting in clogging, fouling and increased resistance that reduces and may possibly eliminate over time any initial efficiency benefits vs. a heat exchanger without such features. To restore heat exchanger efficiency in the original clean state, preventative maintenance may be required to restore designed efficiency.

The driving temperature across the heat transfer surface varies with position, but an approximate mean temperature can be defined. In most simple systems this is the "log mean temperature difference" (LMTD). Sometimes direct knowledge of the LMTD is not available and the NTU method is used.

== Design, manufacturing regulations and validation ==
The design and manufacturing of heat exchangers has numerous regulations, which vary according to the region in which they will be used.

Design and manufacturing codes include: ASME Boiler and Pressure Vessel Code (US); PD 5500 (UK); BS 1566 (UK); EN 13445 (EU); CODAP (French); Pressure Equipment Safety Regulations 2016 (PER) (UK); Pressure Equipment Directive (EU); NORSOK (Norwegian); TEMA; API 12; API 560; API 660; AIAG CQI-29(Brazing System Assessment).

=== Temperature ratings ===
In application heat exchangers can be roughly divided into low-temperature or high-temperature by maximum operating temperature in application. The former work up to 500–650 °C and generally do not require special design and material considerations. The latter work up to 1000 or even 1400 °C but require special design and material considerations.

=== Validation in manufacturing ===
Heat exchanger construction processes may need to be validated before use in application using the following tests:

- thermodynamic performance (SAE J3094, etc.)
- burst at selected multiple of max pressure (expected or measured) in application
- leak (helium, gas, or hydrostatic filled)
- pressure pulsation, # of cycles at selected target pressures and temperatures
- heat soak (ASTM D3045, etc.) at selected target temperature
- cold impact (ASTM D5420, etc.) at selected target temperature
- thermal shock, # of cycles at selected target temperature range
- corrosion
  - internal corrosion analysis with specified fluid
  - external salt spray
- vibration on shaker table
  - resonance, at range of frequencies using given amplitude and direction
  - highly accelerated life test, using vibration profile (historical or measured) expected to be produced when installed in equipment

== Construction types ==
Heat exchangers come in unique designs but generally fall into the following broad categories:

- Double-pipe
- Shell and tube
- Tube and fin (finned plate)
- Plate and fin
- Plate and shell
- Adiabatic wheel
- Pilliow plate
- Direct contact

== Double-pipe ==
Double pipe heat exchangers are the simplest exchangers allowing for the lowest cost and maintenance. In the past they were widely used in application but now are mostly used to teach students heat exchanger design basics to students as the fundamental physics rules for all heat exchangers are the same. Their low efficiency coupled with comparatively large size, has led modern industries to shift use to more efficient heat exchangers like shell and tube or plate.

When one fluid flows through the smaller pipe, the other flows through the annular gap between the two pipes. These flows may be parallel or counter-flows in a double pipe heat exchanger.

The figure above illustrates the parallel and counter-flow flow directions of the fluid exchanger.

== Shell and tube ==
A shell and tube heat exchanger

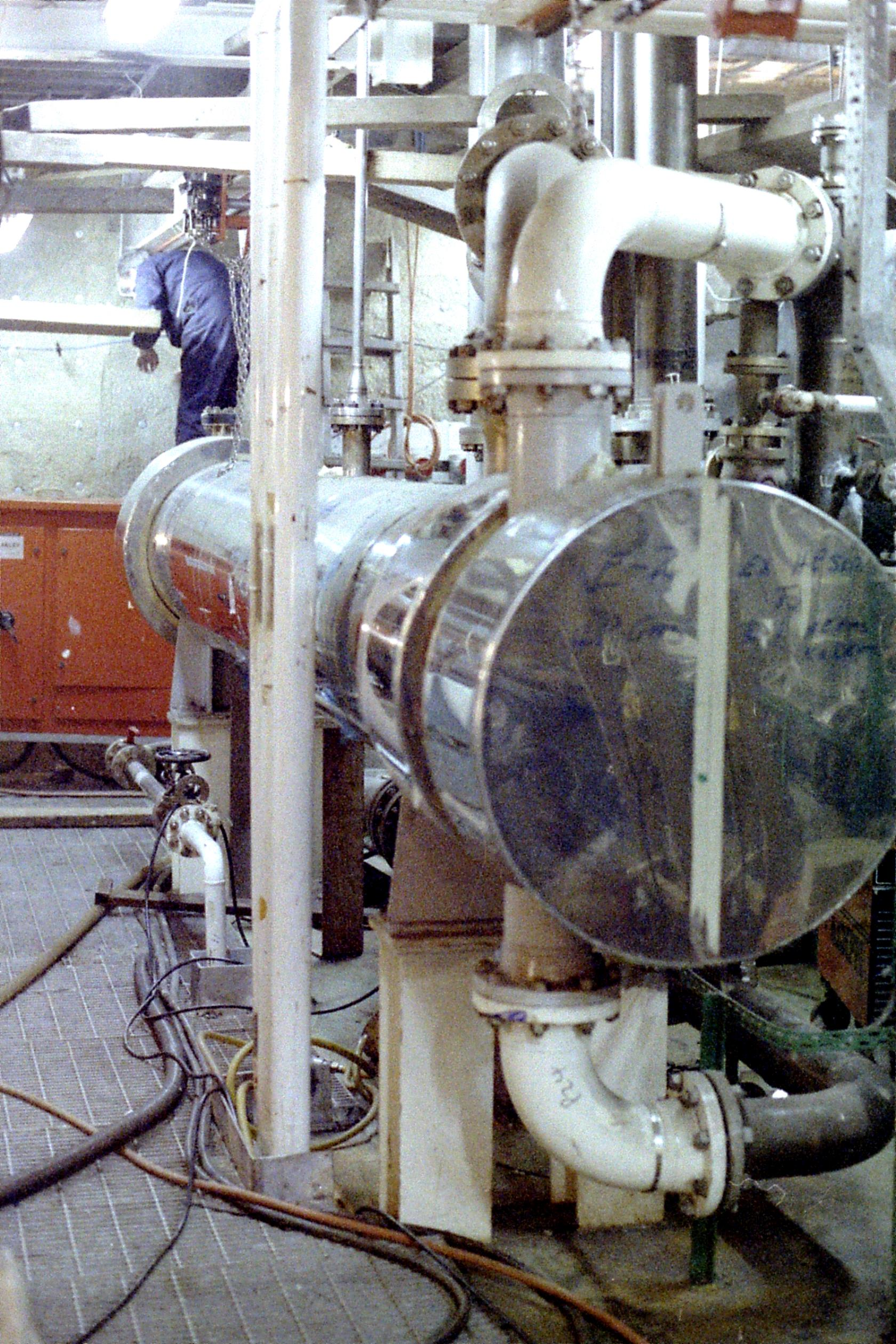
Shell and tube heat exchanger

Shell and tube heat exchangers consist of a series of tubes which contain fluid that must be either heated or cooled. A second fluid contained in an outer shell runs over the tubes that are being heated or cooled so that it can either provide the heat or absorb the heat required. A set of tubes is called the tube bundle and can be made up of several types of tubes: plain, longitudinally finned, bent, U-tubes etc. Shell and tube heat exchangers are typically used for high-pressure, high-temperature applications (with pressures greater than 30 bar and temperatures greater than 260 °C) because the shell and tube heat exchangers are robust due to their shape. There can be many variations on the shell and tube design; however construction should be implemented using industry standards: TEMA. Typically, the ends of each tube are connected to plenums (sometimes called water boxes) through holes in tube-sheets.

Shell and tube heat exchangers have many variations due to the variety of available design features:

- Tube diameter: Using a small tube diameter makes the heat exchanger both economical and compact. However, it is more likely for the heat exchanger to foul up faster and the small size makes mechanical cleaning of the fouling difficult. To prevail over the fouling and cleaning problems, larger tube diameters can be used. Thus to determine the tube diameter, the available space, cost and fouling nature of the fluids must be considered.
- Tube shape: The tube shape can be more oval shaped or an aerofoil to improve the heat transfer while reducing pressure drop.
- Tube thickness: The thickness of the wall of the tubes is usually determined to ensure:
  - There is enough room for corrosion
  - That flow-induced vibration has resistance
  - Axial strength
  - Availability of spare parts
  - Hoop strength (to withstand internal tube pressure)
  - Buckling strength (to withstand overpressure in the shell)
- Tube length: heat exchangers are usually cheaper when they have a smaller shell diameter and a long tube length. Thus, typically there is an aim to make the heat exchanger as long as physically possible whilst not exceeding production capabilities. However, there are many limitations for this, including space available at the installation site and the need to ensure tubes are available in lengths that are twice the required length (so they can be withdrawn and replaced). Also, long, thin tubes are difficult to take out and replace.
- Tube pitch: when designing the tubes, it is practical to ensure that the tube pitch (i.e., the centre-centre distance of adjoining tubes) is not less than 1.25 times the tubes' outside diameter. A larger tube pitch leads to a larger overall shell diameter, which leads to a more expensive heat exchanger.
- Tube corrugation: this type of tubes, mainly used for the inner tubes, increases the turbulence of the fluids and the effect is very important in the heat transfer giving a better performance.
- Tube Layout: refers to how tubes are positioned within the shell. There are four main types of tube layout, which are, triangular (30°), rotated triangular (60°), square (90°) and rotated square (45°). The triangular patterns are employed to give greater heat transfer as they force the fluid to flow in a more turbulent fashion around the piping. Square patterns are employed where high fouling is experienced and cleaning is more regular.
- Baffle Design: baffles are used in shell and tube heat exchangers to support the tubes and direct fluid in a natural manner or to create turbulence (to increase fluid mixing) across the tube bundle. They run perpendicularly to the shell and hold the bundle, preventing the tubes from sagging over a long length. They can also prevent the tubes from vibrating. The most common type of baffle is the segmental baffle. The semicircular segmental baffles are oriented at 180 degrees to the adjacent baffles forcing the fluid to flow upward and downwards between the tube bundle. Baffle spacing is of large thermodynamic concern when designing shell and tube heat exchangers. Baffles must be spaced with consideration for the conversion of pressure drop and heat transfer. For thermo economic optimization it is suggested that the baffles be spaced no closer than 20% of the shell's inner diameter. Having baffles spaced too closely causes a greater pressure drop because of flow redirection. Consequently, having the baffles spaced too far apart means that there may be cooler spots in the corners between baffles. It is also important to ensure the baffles are spaced close enough that the tubes do not sag. The other main type of baffle is the disc and doughnut baffle, which consists of two concentric baffles. An outer, wider baffle looks like a doughnut, whilst the inner baffle is shaped like a disk. This type of baffle forces the fluid to pass around each side of the disk then through the doughnut baffle generating a different type of fluid flow. Baffles are used to support the tubes, direct the fluid flow to the tubes in an approximately natural manner, and maximize the turbulence of the shell fluid. There are many various kinds of baffles, and the choice of baffle form, spacing, and geometry depends on the allowable flow rate of the drop in shell-side force, the need for tube support, and the flow-induced vibrations. There are several variations of shell-and-tube exchangers available; the differences lie in the arrangement of flow configurations and details of construction.
- Tubes & fins Design: in application to cool air with shell-and-tube technology (such as intercooler / charge air cooler for combustion engines), the difference in heat transfer between air and cold fluid can be such that there is a need to increase heat transfer area on air side. For this function fins can be added on the tubes to increase heat transfer area on air side and create a tubes & fins configuration.

Heat exchangers with long service life ideally suitable for marine and harsh environments can be assembled with brass shells, copper tubes, brass baffles, and forged brass integral end hubs, stainless steel, or titanium. (See: Copper in heat exchangers).

=== Shell and helical-coil tube ===
Helical-coil heat exchangers (HCHE) in application have a few advantages:

- Efficient use of space, like a Spiral heat exchanger (SHE),especially when not enough straight pipe length can be used.
- Under conditions of low flowrates (or laminar flow) with low heat-transfer coefficient, such that the typical shell-and-tube exchangers are uneconomical due to the size needed to transfer the heat.
- When there is low pressure in one of the fluids, usually from accumulated pressure drops in other process equipment.
- When one of the fluids has components in multiple phases (solids, liquids, and gases), which tends to create mechanical problems during operations, such as plugging of small-diameter tubes. Cleaning of helical coils for these multiple-phase fluids can prove to be more difficult than its shell and tube counterpart; however the helical coil units typically require cleaning less often.

These have been used in the nuclear industry as a method for exchanging heat in a sodium system for large liquid metal fast breeder reactors since the early 1970s, using a HCHE device invented by Charles E. Boardman and John H. Germer. There are several simple methods for designing HCHE for all types of manufacturing industries, such as using the Ramachandra K. Patil (et al.) method from India and the Scott S. Haraburda method from the United States. However, these designs are based upon assumptions of estimating inside heat transfer coefficient, predicting flow around the outside of the coil, and upon constant heat flux.

=== Spiral shell and tube ===
Schematic drawing of a spiral heat exchanger

A modification to the perpendicular flow of the typical HCHE involves the replacement of shell with another coiled tube, allowing the two fluids to flow parallel to one another, and which requires the use of different design calculations. These are the Spiral Heat Exchangers (SHE), which may refer to a helical (coiled) tube configuration, more generally, the term refers to a pair of flat surfaces that are coiled to form the two channels in a counter-flow arrangement. Each of the two channels has one long curved path. A pair of fluid ports are connected tangentially to the outer arms of the spiral, and axial ports are common, but optional.

The main advantage of the SHE is its highly efficient use of space. This attribute is often leveraged and partially reallocated to gain other improvements in performance, according to well known tradeoffs in heat exchanger design. (A notable tradeoff is capital cost vs operating cost.) A compact SHE may be used to have a smaller footprint and thus lower all-around capital costs, or an oversized SHE may be used to have less pressure drop, less pumping energy, higher thermal efficiency, and lower energy costs.

==== Construction ====
The distance between the sheets in the spiral channels is maintained by using spacer studs that were welded prior to rolling. Once the main spiral pack has been rolled, alternate top and bottom edges are welded and each end closed by a gasketed flat or conical cover bolted to the body. This ensures no mixing of the two fluids occurs. Any leakage is from the periphery cover to the atmosphere, or to a passage that contains the same fluid.

==== Self cleaning ====
Spiral heat exchangers are often used in the heating of fluids that contain solids and thus tend to foul the inside of the heat exchanger. The low pressure drop lets the SHE handle fouling more easily. The SHE uses a “self cleaning” mechanism, whereby fouled surfaces cause a localized increase in fluid velocity, thus increasing the drag (or fluid friction) on the fouled surface, thus helping to dislodge the blockage and keep the heat exchanger clean. "The internal walls that make up the heat transfer surface are often rather thick, which makes the SHE very robust, and able to last a long time in demanding environments." They are also easily cleaned, opening out like an oven where any buildup of foulant can be removed by pressure washing.

Self-cleaning water filters are used to keep the system clean and running without the need to shut down or replace cartridges and bags.

==== Flow arrangements ====
A comparison between the operations and effects of a cocurrent and a countercurrent flow exchange system is depicted by the upper and lower diagrams respectively. In both it is assumed (and indicated) that red has a higher value (e.g. of temperature) than blue and that the property being transported in the channels therefore flows from red to blue. Channels are contiguous if effective exchange is to occur (i.e. there can be no gap between the channels).

There are three main types of flows in a spiral heat exchanger:

- Counter-current Flow: Fluids flow in opposite directions. These are used for liquid-liquid, condensing and gas cooling applications. Units are usually mounted vertically when condensing vapour and mounted horizontally when handling high concentrations of solids.
- Spiral Flow/Cross Flow: One fluid is in spiral flow and the other in a cross flow. Spiral flow passages are welded at each side for this type of spiral heat exchanger. This type of flow is suitable for handling low density gas, which passes through the cross flow, avoiding pressure loss. It can be used for liquid-liquid applications if one liquid has a considerably greater flow rate than the other.
- Distributed Vapour/Spiral flow: This design is that of a condenser, and is usually mounted vertically. It is designed to cater for the sub-cooling of both condensate and non-condensables. The coolant moves in a spiral and leaves via the top. Hot gases that enter leave as condensate via the bottom outlet.

==== Applications ====
The Spiral heat exchanger is good for applications such as pasteurization, digester heating, heat recovery, pre-heating (see: recuperator), and effluent cooling. For sludge treatment, SHEs are generally smaller than other types of heat exchangers. These are used to transfer the heat.

== Plate and fin ==
Conceptual diagram of a plate and frame heat exchanger

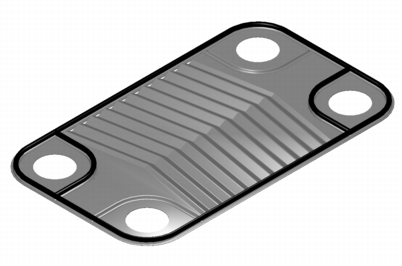
A single plate heat exchanger

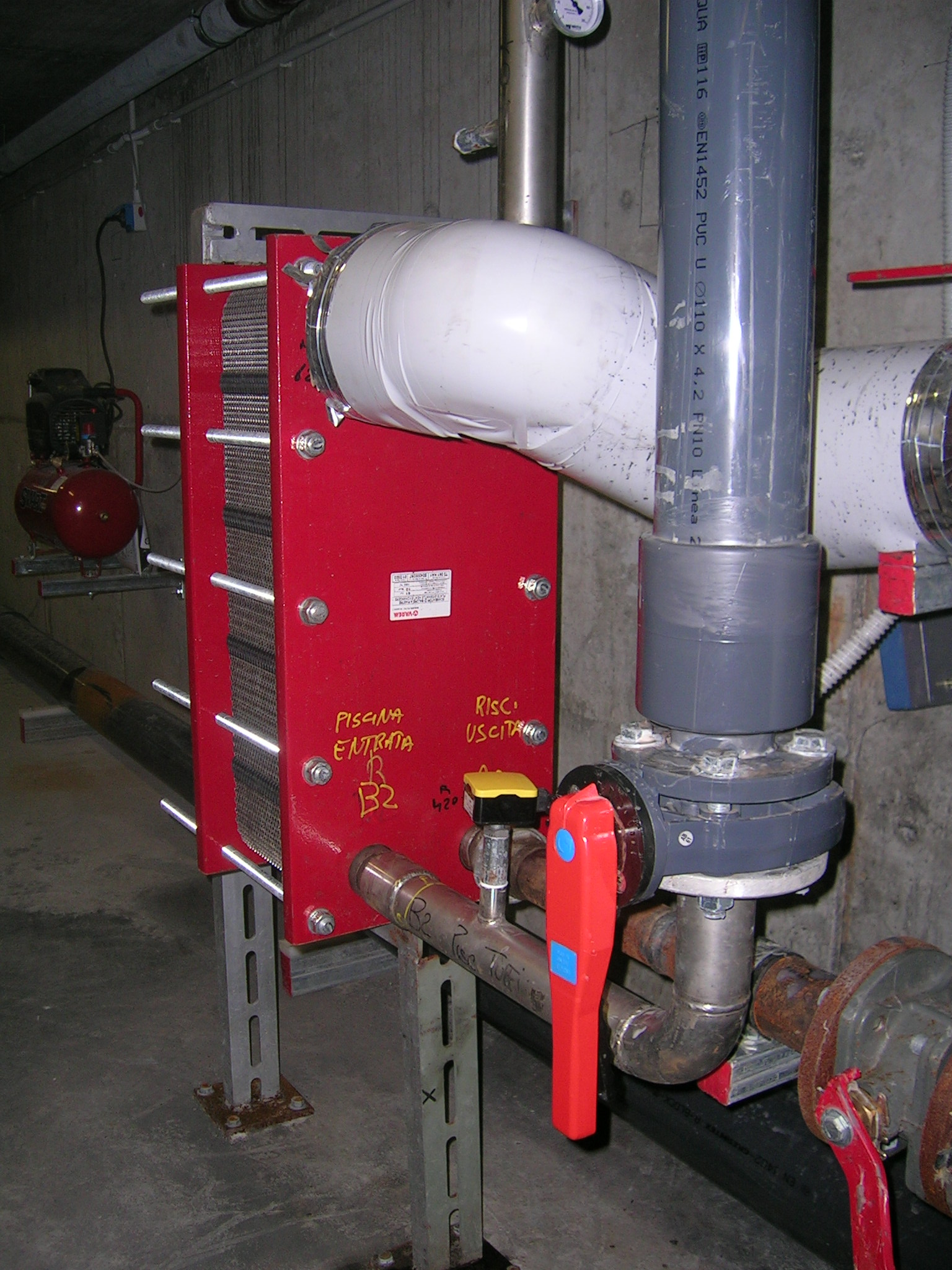
An interchangeable plate heat exchanger directly applied to the system of a swimming pool

Another type of heat exchanger is the plate heat exchanger. These exchangers are composed of many thin, slightly separated plates that have very large surface areas and small fluid flow passages for heat transfer. Gaskets seal the spaces between each pair of adjacent plates, creating two independent flow channels. This design allows two different fluids to flow through alternate channels without mixing. The plates are secured together using welding and bolting methods to ensure structural integrity and prevent leakage. Advances in gasket and brazing technology have made the plate-type heat exchanger increasingly practical.

In HVAC applications, large heat exchangers of this type are called plate-and-frame; when used in open loops, these heat exchangers are normally of the gasket type to allow periodic disassembly, cleaning, and inspection. There are many types of permanently bonded plate heat exchangers, such as dip-brazed, vacuum-brazed, and welded plate varieties, and they are often specified for closed-loop applications such as refrigeration. Plate heat exchangers also differ in the types of plates that are used, and in the configurations of those plates. Some plates may be stamped with "chevron", dimpled, or other patterns, where others may have machined fins and/or grooves.

When compared to shell and tube exchangers, the stacked-plate arrangement typically has lower volume and cost. Another difference between the two is that plate exchangers typically serve low to medium pressure fluids, compared to medium and high pressures of shell and tube. A third and important difference is that plate exchangers employ more countercurrent flow rather than cross current flow, which allows lower approach temperature differences, high temperature changes, and increased efficiencies.

The corrugated surface patterns on the plates serve two critical functions: they increase the surface area available for heat transfer and create turbulent flow that enhances thermal performance. In counter-current configuration, the two fluids flow in opposite directions through adjacent channels, which maximizes the temperature difference available for heat exchange and improves efficiency.

Gaskets positioned between the outer frame plates and inner pressure plates create a reliable seal that prevents cross-contamination. The distribution design ensures fluid flows across the entire heat transfer surface, preventing stagnant zones where deposits might accumulate. Plate heat exchangers are manufactured in various configurations including plate and frame, plate and shell, and spiral designs with different plate depths, sizes, and corrugation patterns to accommodate specific applications and performance requirements.

This type of heat exchanger uses "sandwiched" passages containing fins to increase the effectiveness of the unit. The designs include crossflow and counterflow coupled with various fin configurations such as straight fins, offset fins and wavy fins.

Plate and fin heat exchangers are usually made of aluminum alloys, which provide high heat transfer efficiency. The material enables the system to operate at a lower temperature difference and reduce the weight of the equipment. Plate and fin heat exchangers are mostly used for low temperature services such as natural gas, helium and oxygen liquefaction plants, air separation plants and transport industries such as motor and aircraft engines.

Advantages of plate and fin heat exchangers:

- High heat transfer efficiency especially in gas treatment
- Larger heat transfer area
- Approximately 5 times lighter in weight than that of shell and tube heat exchanger.
- Able to withstand high pressure

Disadvantages of plate and fin heat exchangers:

- Might cause clogging as the pathways are very narrow
- Difficult to clean the pathways
- Aluminium alloys are susceptible to Mercury Liquid Embrittlement Failure

== Plate and shell ==
The plate and shell heat exchanger is constructed completely without gaskets, which provides security against leakage at high pressures and temperatures. Inside the shell of the heat exchanger is a fully welded circular plate pack made by pressing and cutting round plates and welding them together. Nozzles carry flow in and out of the platepack (the 'Plate side' flowpath). The fully welded platepack is assembled into an outer shell that creates a second flowpath (the 'Shell side'). Plate and shell technology offers high heat transfer, high pressure, high operating temperature, compact size, low fouling and close approach temperature.

== Adiabatic wheel ==
Adiabatic wheel heat exchangers use an intermediate fluid or solid store to hold heat, which is then moved to the other side of the heat exchanger to be released. Two examples of this are adiabatic wheels, which consist of a large wheel with fine threads rotating through the hot and cold fluids, and fluid heat exchangers.

== Pillow plate ==
A pillow plate heat exchanger is commonly used in the dairy industry for cooling milk in stainless steel bulk tanks. Nearly the entire surface area of a tank can be integrated with this heat exchanger, without gaps that would occur between pipes welded to the exterior of the tank. Pillow plates can also be constructed as flat plates that are stacked inside a tank. The relatively flat surface of the plates allows easy cleaning, especially in sterile applications.

The pillow plate can be constructed using either a thin sheet of metal welded to the thicker surface of a tank or vessel, or two thin sheets welded together. The surface of the plate is welded with a regular pattern of dots or a serpentine pattern of weld lines. After welding the enclosed space is pressurised with sufficient force to cause direct-expansion of the thin metal to bulge out around the welds, providing a space for heat exchanger liquids to flow, and creating a characteristic appearance of a swelled pillow formed out of metal.

== Direct contact ==
Direct contact heat exchangers involve heat transfer between hot and cold streams of two phases in the absence of a separating wall. Thus such heat exchangers can be classified as:

- Gas – liquid
- Immiscible liquid – liquid
- Solid-liquid or solid – gas

Most direct contact heat exchangers fall under the Gas – Liquid category, where heat is transferred between a gas and liquid in the form of drops, films or sprays.

Such types of heat exchangers are used predominantly in air conditioning, humidification, industrial hot water heating, water cooling and condensing plants.

Phases	Continuous phase	Driving force	Change of phase	Examples
Gas – Liquid	Gas	Gravity	No	Spray columns, packed columns
			Yes	Cooling towers, falling droplet evaporators
		Forced	No	Spray coolers/quenchers
		Liquid flow	Yes	Spray condensers/evaporation, jet condensers
	Liquid	Gravity	No	Bubble columns, perforated tray columns
			Yes	Bubble column condensers
		Forced	No	Gas spargers
		Gas flow	Yes	Direct contact evaporators, submerged combustion

== Finned tube/microchannel ==
The usage of fins in a tube-based heat exchanger is common when one of the working fluids is a low-pressure gas, and is typical for heat exchangers that operate using ambient air, such as automotive radiators and HVAC air condensers. Fins dramatically increase the surface area with which heat can be exchanged, improving the efficiency of conducting heat to a fluid with very low thermal conductivity, such as air. Fins are typically made from aluminium or copper since they must conduct heat from the tube along the length of the fins, which are usually very thin.

The main construction types of finned tube (tube and fin) exchangers are:

- A stack of evenly-spaced metal plates act as the fins and the tubes are pressed through pre-cut holes in the fins, good thermal contact usually being achieved by deformation of the fins around the tube. This is typical construction for HVAC air coils and large refrigeration condensers.
- Fins are spiral-wound onto individual tubes as a continuous strip, the tubes can then be assembled in banks, bent in a serpentine pattern, or wound into large spirals.
- Zig-zag metal strips are sandwiched between flat rectangular tubes, often being soldered or brazed together for good thermal and mechanical strength. This is common in low-pressure heat exchangers such as water-cooling radiators. Regular flat tubes will expand and deform if exposed to high pressures but flat microchannel tubes allow this construction to be used for high pressures.

Stacked-fin or spiral-wound construction can be used for the tubes inside shell-and-tube heat exchangers when high efficiency thermal transfer to a gas is required.

In electronics cooling, heat sinks, particularly those using heat pipes, can have a stacked-fin construction.

=== Microchannel ===
Microchannel/multi-pass parallel flow heat exchangers consis of three main elements: manifolds (inlet and outlet), multi-port tubes with the hydraulic diameters smaller than 1mm, and fins. All the elements usually are assembled together using a controllable atmosphere brazing process. Microchannel heat exchangers are characterized by high heat transfer ratio, low refrigerant charges, compact size, and lower airside pressure drops compared to finned tube heat exchangers. Microchannel heat exchangers are widely used in automotive industry as the car radiators, and as condenser, evaporator, and cooling/heating coils in HVAC industry.

Micro heat exchangers, Micro-scale heat exchangers, or microstructured heat exchangers are heat exchangers in which (at least one) fluid flows in lateral confinements with typical dimensions below 1 mm. The most typical such confinement are microchannels, which are channels with a hydraulic diameter below 1 mm. Microchannel heat exchangers can be made from metal or ceramics. Microchannel heat exchangers can be used for many applications including:

- high-performance aircraft gas turbine engines
- heat pumps
- Microprocessor and microchip cooling
- air conditioning

==== Finned tube sub-types ====
- Fixed Tubesheet
- Floating Tubesheet
- U-Tube
- Condensers
- Kettle Reboiler
- Stack Type Heat Exchanger
- Evaporator

== Phase-change applications ==
Heat exchangers using a two-phase heat transfer system are condensers, boilers and evaporators. Condensers are instruments that take and cool hot gas or vapor to the point of condensation and transform the gas into a liquid form. The point at which liquid transforms to gas is called vaporization and vice versa is called condensation. Surface condenser is the most common type of condenser where it includes a water supply device. Figure 5 below displays a two-pass surface condenser.

The pressure of steam at the turbine outlet is low where the steam density is very low where the flow rate is very high. To prevent a decrease in pressure in the movement of steam from the turbine to condenser, the condenser unit is placed underneath and connected to the turbine. Inside the tubes the cooling water runs in a parallel way, while steam moves in a vertical downward position from the wide opening at the top and travel through the tube.

Furthermore, boilers are categorized as initial application of heat exchangers. The word steam generator was regularly used to describe a boiler unit where a hot liquid stream is the source of heat rather than the combustion products. Depending on the dimensions and configurations the boilers are manufactured. Several boilers are only able to produce hot fluid while on the other hand the others are manufactured for steam production.

Typical kettle reboiler used for industrial distillation towers

Typical water-cooled surface condenser

In addition to heating up or cooling down fluids in just a single phase, heat exchangers can be used either to heat a liquid to evaporate (or boil) it or used as condensers to cool a vapor and condense it to a liquid. In chemical plants and refineries, reboilers used to heat incoming feed for distillation towers are often heat exchangers. Distillation set-ups typically use condensers to condense distillate vapors back into liquid. Power plants that use steam-driven turbines commonly use heat exchangers to boil water into steam. Heat exchangers or similar units for producing steam from water are often called boilers or steam generators. In the nuclear power plants called pressurized water reactors, special large heat exchangers pass heat from the primary (reactor plant) system to the secondary (steam plant) system, producing steam from water in the process. These are called steam generators. All fossil-fueled and nuclear power plants using steam-driven turbines have surface condensers to convert the exhaust steam from the turbines into condensate (water) for re-use. To conserve energy and cooling capacity in chemical and other plants, regenerative heat exchangers can transfer heat from a stream that must be cooled to another stream that must be heated, such as distillate cooling and reboiler feed pre-heating.

This term can also refer to heat exchangers that contain a material within their structure that has a change of phase. This is usually a solid to liquid phase due to the small volume difference between these states. This change of phase effectively acts as a buffer because it occurs at a constant temperature but still allows for the heat exchanger to accept additional heat. One example where this has been investigated is for use in high power aircraft electronics.

Heat exchangers functioning in multiphase flow regimes may be subject to the Ledinegg instability.

== In waste heat recovery units ==
A waste heat recovery unit (WHRU) is a heat exchanger that recovers heat from a hot gas stream while transferring it to a working medium, typically water or oils. The hot gas stream can be the exhaust gas from a gas turbine or a diesel engine or a waste gas from industry or refinery.

Large systems with high volume and temperature gas streams, typical in industry, can benefit from steam Rankine cycle (SRC) in a waste heat recovery unit, but these cycles are too expensive for small systems. The recovery of heat from low temperature systems requires different working fluids than steam.

An organic Rankine cycle (ORC) waste heat recovery unit can be more efficient at low temperature range using refrigerants that boil at lower temperatures than water. Typical organic refrigerants are ammonia, pentafluoropropane (R-245fa and R-245ca), and toluene.

The refrigerant is boiled by the heat source in the evaporator to produce super-heated vapor. This fluid is expanded in the turbine to convert thermal energy to kinetic energy, that is converted to electricity in the electrical generator. This energy transfer process decreases the temperature of the refrigerant that, in turn, condenses. The cycle is closed and completed using a pump to send the fluid back to the evaporator.

== In high-viscosity products ==
Another type of heat exchanger is called "(dynamic) scraped surface heat exchanger". This is mainly used for heating or cooling with high-viscosity products, crystallization processes, evaporation and high-fouling applications. Long running times are achieved due to the continuous scraping of the surface, thus avoiding fouling and achieving a sustainable heat transfer rate during the process.

== In HVAC and refrigeration air ==
One of the widest uses of heat exchangers is for refrigeration and air conditioning. This class of heat exchangers is commonly called air coils, or just coils due to their often-serpentine internal tubing, or condensers in the case of refrigeration, and are typically of the finned tube type. Liquid-to-air, or air-to-liquid HVAC coils are typically of modified crossflow arrangement. In vehicles, heat coils are often called heater cores.

On the liquid side of these heat exchangers, the common fluids are water, a water-glycol solution, steam, or a refrigerant. For heating coils, hot water and steam are the most common, and this heated fluid is supplied by boilers, for example. For cooling coils, chilled water and refrigerant are most common. Chilled water is supplied from a chiller that is potentially located very far away, but refrigerant must come from a nearby condensing unit. When a refrigerant is used, the cooling coil is the evaporator, and the heating coil is the condenser in the vapor-compression refrigeration cycle. HVAC coils that use this direct-expansion of refrigerants are commonly called DX coils. Some DX coils are "microchannel" type.

On the air side of HVAC coils a significant difference exists between those used for heating, and those for cooling. Due to psychrometrics, air that is cooled often has moisture condensing out of it, except with extremely dry air flows. Heating some air increases that airflow's capacity to hold water. So heating coils need not consider moisture condensation on their air-side, but cooling coils must be adequately designed and selected to handle their particular latent (moisture) as well as the sensible (cooling) loads. The water that is removed is called condensate.

For many climates, water or steam HVAC coils can be exposed to freezing conditions. Because water expands upon freezing, these somewhat expensive and difficult to replace thin-walled heat exchangers can easily be damaged or destroyed by just one freeze. As such, freeze protection of coils is a major concern of HVAC designers, installers, and operators.

The introduction of indentations placed within the heat exchange fins controlled condensation, allowing water molecules to remain in the cooled air.

The heat exchangers in direct-combustion furnaces, typical in many residences, are not 'coils'. They are, instead, gas-to-air heat exchangers that are typically made of stamped steel sheet metal. The combustion products pass on one side of these heat exchangers, and air to heat on the other. A cracked heat exchanger is therefore a dangerous situation that requires immediate attention because combustion products may enter living space.

=== HVAC coil size ===
As of 2026 small-diameter coil technologies are becoming more popular in modern air conditioning and refrigeration systems due to better heat transfer rates than conventionally sized (3/8" (9mm) or greater) condenser and evaporator coils. Additionally, small diameter coils can withstand higher pressures of the new generation of environmentally friendlier refrigerants before bursting.

To further increase the heat transfer of the coi copper microgroove

Choosing the right heat exchanger (HX) requires some knowledge of the different heat exchanger types, as well as the environment where the unit must operate. Typically in the manufacturing industry, several differing types of heat exchangers are used for just one process or system to derive the final product. For example, a kettle HX for pre-heating, a double pipe HX for the 'carrier' fluid and a plate and frame HX for final cooling. With sufficient knowledge of heat exchanger types and operating requirements, an appropriate selection can be made to optimise the process.

== Selection ==
Due to the many variables involved, selecting optimal heat exchangers for a target capacity (kW) can be challenging. Hand calculations are possible, but many iterations are typically needed. As such, most often heat exchanger parameters are varied and simulated by computer programs until the desired heat exchanger is selected, either by system designers, who are typically engineers, or by equipment vendors.

Computer programs can vary the following dimensional simulation parameters

- Number of Cores
- Number of Passes and Micro channel Plates / Tubes for each pass
- Tube Radius
- Micro channel Height / Length / Depth Number of Channels per Plate, Channel Radius or Width/Height, Pitch Distance between Channel and Distance to Surface
- Fin Shape, Type, Thickness, Length, Pitch

To select an appropriate heat exchanger, the system designers (or equipment vendors) would firstly consider the design limitations for each heat exchanger type. Though cost is often the primary criterion, several other selection criteria are important:

- Heat Exchange Capacity (kW)
- High/low pressure limits
- Thermal performance
- Temperature ranges
- Product mix (liquid/liquid, particulates or high-solids liquid)
- Pressure drops across the exchanger
- Fluid flow capacity
- Cleanability, maintenance and repair
- Materials required for construction
- Ability and ease of future expansion
- Material selection, such as copper, aluminium, carbon steel, stainless steel, nickel alloys, ceramic, polymer, and titanium.
- Size.

A heat exchanger for an evaporator can be provided with performance data at various air flow rates at an ideally constant mix (fresh and re-circulation) air temperature and humidity. Correction factors can be used to estimate performance at other air temperatures or humidities.

Heat Exchanger Performance
Atribrutes						
Air Flow Rate(CMH)	250	300	350	400	450	500
Air Pressure Drop (Pa)	20	30	40	50	70	85
Refrigerant Flow Rate (kg/h	75	89	103	115	126	140
Refrigerant Pressure Drop (Pa)	4	4.8	5.8	6.5	7.2	8
Heat Exchange Capacity (kW)	3	3.5	4.2	4.6	5.2	5.6

== Monitoring ==
Online monitoring of commercial heat exchangers is done by tracking the overall heat transfer coefficient. The overall heat transfer coefficient tends to decline over time due to fouling.

By periodically calculating the overall heat transfer coefficient from exchanger flow rates and temperatures, the owner of the heat exchanger can estimate when cleaning the heat exchanger is economically attractive.

== Maintenance, inspection and testing ==
Maintaining the safety and establishing the inspection interval of a heat exchanger can be the result of a risk assessment or more broadly a good manufacturing practice. Many industries use heat exchangers to cool products: milk, food, beer, active pharmaceutical ingredients that may be more stringently and prescriptively regulated by a governing body, the FDA (through the FSMA) or CFIA using various industry standards: 3-A.

Heat exchanges can be maintained through Tubular NDT and other techniques for optimal performance, to possibly prevent cross contamination, or leaks using various inspection and testing methods:

- Visual (low cost) of the bolts, fasteners, connections, shell, surfaces, gaskets, fins, fans and structure, etc.
- Dye penetration for cracks
- Gas leak testing using pressure and helium, air, dyes, etc.
- Hydrostatic pressure testing
- Ultrasonic Testing (UT) can reveal remaining wall thickness and corrosion extent
- Eddy current testing of conductivity
- Magnetic Flux Leakage (MFL)
- Borescope or Fiberscope for internal viewing
- Pressure drop analysis
- Thermal performance logging

=== Fouling maintenance ===
Plate and frame heat exchangers can be disassembled and cleaned periodically. Tubular heat exchangers can be cleaned by such methods as acid cleaning, sandblasting, high-pressure water jet, bullet cleaning, or drill rods.

In large-scale cooling water systems for heat exchangers, water treatment such as purification, addition of chemicals, and testing, is used to minimize fouling of the heat exchange equipment. Other water treatment is also used in steam systems for power plants, etc. to minimize fouling and corrosion of the heat exchange and other equipment.

Using oscillating magnetic fields to move fluid within a heat exchanger, without the use of chemicals, can be used to prevent biofouling.

== Fouling ==
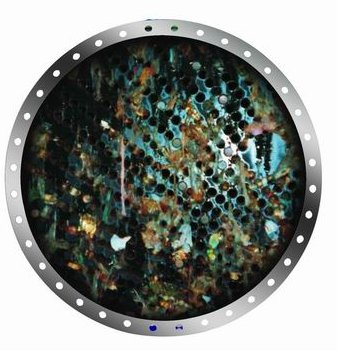
A heat exchanger in a steam power station contaminated with macrofouling

Fouling occurs when impurities deposit on the heat exchange surface. Deposition of these impurities can decrease heat transfer effectiveness significantly over time and are caused by:

- Low wall shear stress
- Low fluid velocities
- High fluid velocities
- Reaction product solid precipitation
- Precipitation of dissolved impurities due to elevated wall temperatures

The rate of heat exchanger fouling is determined by the rate of particle deposition less re-entrainment/suppression. This model was originally proposed in 1959 by Kern and Seaton.

Crude Oil Exchanger Fouling. In commercial crude oil refining, crude oil is heated from 21 °C (70 °F) to 343 °C (649 °F) prior to entering the distillation column. A series of shell and tube heat exchangers typically exchange heat between crude oil and other oil streams to heat the crude to 260 °C (500 °F) prior to heating in a furnace. Fouling occurs on the crude side of these exchangers due to asphaltene insolubility. The nature of asphaltene solubility in crude oil was successfully modeled by Wiehe and Kennedy. The precipitation of insoluble asphaltenes in crude preheat trains has been successfully modeled as a first order reaction by Ebert and Panchal who expanded on the work of Kern and Seaton.

Cooling Water Fouling. Cooling water systems are susceptible to fouling. Cooling water typically has a high total dissolved solids content and suspended colloidal solids. Localized precipitation of dissolved solids occurs at the heat exchange surface due to wall temperatures higher than bulk fluid temperature. Low fluid velocities (less than 3 ft/s) allow suspended solids to settle on the heat exchange surface. Cooling water is typically on the tube side of a shell and tube exchanger because it's easy to clean. To prevent fouling, designers typically ensure that cooling water velocity is greater than 0.9 m/s and bulk fluid temperature is maintained less than 60 °C (140 °F). Other approaches to control fouling control combine the "blind" application of biocides and anti-scale chemicals with periodic lab testing.

== In nature ==
=== Humans ===
The human nasal passages serve as a heat exchanger, with cool air being inhaled and warm air being exhaled. Its effectiveness can be demonstrated by putting the hand in front of the face and exhaling, first through the nose and then through the mouth. Air exhaled through the nose is substantially cooler. This effect can be enhanced with clothing, by, for example, wearing a scarf over the face while breathing in cold weather.

In species that have external testes (such as human), the artery to the testis is surrounded by a mesh of veins called the pampiniform plexus. This cools the blood heading to the testes, while reheating the returning blood.

=== Birds, fish, marine mammals ===
Counter-current exchange conservation circuit

"Countercurrent" heat exchangers occur naturally in the circulatory systems of fish, whales and other marine mammals. Arteries to the skin carrying warm blood are intertwined with veins from the skin carrying cold blood, causing the warm arterial blood to exchange heat with the cold venous blood. This reduces the overall heat loss in cold water. Heat exchangers are also present in the tongues of baleen whales as large volumes of water flow through their mouths. Wading birds use a similar system to limit heat losses from their body through their legs into the water.

=== Carotid rete ===
Carotid rete is a counter-current heat exchanging organ in some ungulates. The blood ascending the carotid arteries on its way to the brain, flows via a network of vessels where heat is discharged to the veins of cooler blood descending from the nasal passages. The carotid rete allows Thomson's gazelle to maintain its brain almost 3 °C (5.4 °F) cooler than the rest of the body, and therefore aids in tolerating bursts in metabolic heat production such as associated with outrunning cheetahs (during which the body temperature exceeds the maximum temperature at which the brain could function). Humans and other primates lack a carotid rete.

== In industry ==
Heat exchangers are widely used in industry both for cooling and heating large scale industrial processes. The type and size of heat exchanger used can be tailored to suit a process depending on the type of fluid, its phase, temperature, density, viscosity, pressures, chemical composition and various other thermodynamic properties.

In many industrial processes there is waste of energy or a heat stream that is being exhausted, heat exchangers can be used to recover this heat and put it to use by heating a different stream in the process. This practice saves a lot of money in industry, as the heat supplied to other streams from the heat exchangers would otherwise come from an external source that is more expensive and more harmful to the environment.

Heat exchangers are used in many industries, including:

- Waste water treatment
- Refrigeration
- Wine and beer making
- Petroleum refining
- Nuclear power

In waste water treatment, heat exchangers play a vital role in maintaining optimal temperatures within anaerobic digesters to promote the growth of microbes that remove pollutants. Common types of heat exchangers used in this application are the double pipe heat exchanger as well as the plate and frame heat exchanger.

== In aircraft ==
In commercial aircraft heat exchangers are used to take heat from the engine's oil system to heat cold fuel. This improves fuel efficiency, as well as reduces the possibility of water entrapped in the fuel freezing in components.

== Current market and forecast ==
Estimated at US$17.5 billion in 2021, the global demand of heat exchangers is expected to experience robust growth of about 5% annually over the next years. The market value is expected to reach US$27 billion by 2030. With an expanding desire for environmentally friendly options and increased development of offices, retail sectors, and public buildings, market expansion is due to grow.

== A model of a simple heat exchanger ==
A simple heat exchange might be thought of as two straight pipes with fluid flow, which are thermally connected. Let the pipes be of equal length L, carrying fluids with heat capacity $C_i$ (energy per unit mass per unit change in temperature) and let the mass flow rate of the fluids through the pipes, both in the same direction, be $j_i$ (mass per unit time), where the subscript i applies to pipe 1 or pipe 2.

Temperature profiles for the pipes are $T_1(x)$ and $T_2(x)$ where x is the distance along the pipe. Assume a steady state, so that the temperature profiles are not functions of time. Assume also that the only transfer of heat from a small volume of fluid in one pipe is to the fluid element in the other pipe at the same position, i.e., there is no transfer of heat along a pipe due to temperature differences in that pipe. By Newton's law of cooling the rate of change in energy of a small volume of fluid is proportional to the difference in temperatures between it and the corresponding element in the other pipe:

$$\frac{du_1}{dt}=\gamma(T_2-T_1)$$

$$\frac{du_2}{dt}=\gamma(T_1-T_2)$$

( this is for parallel flow in the same direction and opposite temperature gradients, but for counter-flow heat exchange countercurrent exchange the sign is opposite in the second equation in front of $\gamma(T_1-T_2)$ ), where $u_i(x)$ is the thermal energy per unit length and γ is the thermal connection constant per unit length between the two pipes. This change in internal energy results in a change in the temperature of the fluid element. The time rate of change for the fluid element being carried along by the flow is:

$$\frac{du_1}{dt}=J_1 \frac{dT_1}{dx}$$

$$\frac{du_2}{dt}=J_2 \frac{dT_2}{dx}$$

where $J_i={C_i} {j_i}$ is the "thermal mass flow rate". The differential equations governing the heat exchanger may now be written as:

$$J_1\frac{\partial T_1}{\partial x}=\gamma(T_2-T_1)$$

$$J_2\frac{\partial T_2}{\partial x}=\gamma(T_1-T_2).$$

Since the system is in a steady state, there are no partial derivatives of temperature with respect to time, and since there is no heat transfer along the pipe, there are no second derivatives in x as is found in the heat equation. These two coupled first-order differential equations may be solved to yield:

$$T_1=A-\frac{Bk_1}{k}\,e^{-kx}$$

$$T_2=A+\frac{Bk_2}{k}\,e^{-kx}$$

where $k_1=\gamma/J_1$, $k_2=\gamma/J_2$,

$$k=k_1+k_2$$

(this is for parallel-flow, but for counter-flow the sign in front of $k_2$ is negative, so that if $k_2=k_1$, for the same "thermal mass flow rate" in both opposite directions, the gradient of temperature is constant and the temperatures linear in position x with a constant difference $(T_2-T_1)$ along the exchanger, explaining why the counter current design countercurrent exchange is the most efficient )

and A and B are two as yet undetermined constants of integration. Let $T_{10}$ and $T_{20}$ be the temperatures at x=0 and let $T_{1L}$ and $T_{2L}$ be the temperatures at the end of the pipe at x=L. Define the average temperatures in each pipe as:

$$\overline{T}_1=\frac{1}{L}\int_0^LT_1(x)dx$$
$$\overline{T}_2=\frac{1}{L}\int_0^LT_2(x)dx.$$

Using the solutions above, these temperatures are:

$T_{10}=A-\frac{Bk_1}{k}$	$T_{20}=A+\frac{Bk_2}{k}$
$T_{1L}=A-\frac{Bk_1}{k}e^{-kL}$	$T_{2L}=A+\frac{Bk_2}{k}e^{-kL}$
$\overline{T}_1=A-\frac{Bk_1}{k^2L}(1-e^{-kL})$	$\overline{T}_2=A+\frac{Bk_2}{k^2L}(1-e^{-kL}).$

Choosing any two of the temperatures above eliminates the constants of integration, letting us find the other four temperatures. We find the total energy transferred by integrating the expressions for the time rate of change of internal energy per unit length:

$$\frac{dU_1}{dt} = \int_0^L \frac{du_1}{dt}\,dx = J_1(T_{1L}-T_{10})=\gamma L(\overline{T}_2-\overline{T}_1)$$

$$\frac{dU_2}{dt} = \int_0^L \frac{du_2}{dt}\,dx = J_2(T_{2L}-T_{20})=\gamma L(\overline{T}_1-\overline{T}_2).$$

By the conservation of energy, the sum of the two energies is zero. The quantity $\overline{T}_2-\overline{T}_1$ is known as the Log mean temperature difference, and is a measure of the effectiveness of the heat exchanger in transferring heat energy.

== See also ==
- Architectural engineering
- Chemical engineering
- Cooling tower
- Copper in heat exchangers
- Heat pipe
- Heat pump
- Heat recovery ventilation
- Jacketed vessel
- Log mean temperature difference (LMTD)
- Marine heat exchangers
- Mechanical engineering
- Micro heat exchanger
- Moving bed heat exchanger
- Packed bed and in particular Packed columns
- Pumpable ice technology
- Reboiler
- Recuperator, or cross plate heat exchanger
- Regenerator
- Run around coil
- Steam generator (nuclear power)
- Surface condenser
- Toroidal expansion joint
- Thermosiphon
- Thermal wheel, or rotary heat exchanger (including enthalpy wheel and desiccant wheel)
- Tube tool
- Waste heat
