= Logarithmic mean temperature difference =

Method of calculating heat transfer in flow systems

In thermal engineering, the logarithmic mean temperature difference (LMTD) is used to determine the temperature driving force for heat transfer in flow systems, most notably in heat exchangers. The LMTD is a logarithmic average of the temperature difference between the hot and cold feeds at each end of the double pipe exchanger. For a given heat exchanger with constant area and heat transfer coefficient, the larger the LMTD, the more heat is transferred. The use of the LMTD arises straightforwardly from the analysis of a heat exchanger with constant flow rate and fluid thermal properties.

== Definition ==
We assume that a generic heat exchanger has two ends (which we call "A" and "B") at which the hot and cold streams enter or exit on either side; then, the LMTD is defined by the logarithmic mean as follows:

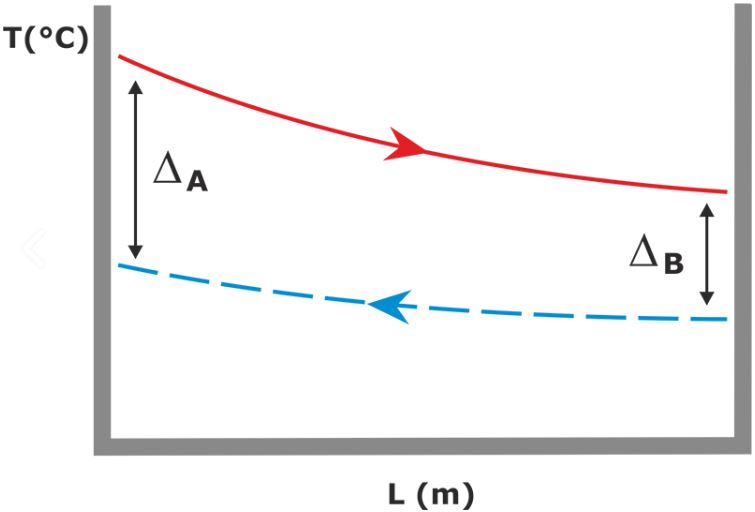
The LMTD illustrated in a countercurrent temperature profile

$$\mathrm{LMTD}
=\frac{\Delta T_A - \Delta T_B}{\ln \left( \frac{\Delta T_A}{\Delta T_B} \right ) }
=\frac{\Delta T_A - \Delta T_B}{\ln \Delta T_A - \ln \Delta T_B}$$

where ΔT_{A} is the temperature difference between the two streams at end A, and ΔT_{B} is the temperature difference between the two streams at end B. When the two temperature differences are equal, this formula does not directly resolve, so the LMTD is conventionally taken to equal its limit value, which is in this case trivially equal to the two differences.

With this definition, the LMTD can be used to find the exchanged heat in a heat exchanger:

$$Q = \alpha \times A \times \mathrm{LMTD}$$

where (in SI units):

- Q is the exchanged heat duty (watts),
- $\alpha$ is the heat transfer coefficient (watts per kelvin per square meter),
- A is the exchange area.

Note that estimating the heat transfer coefficient may be quite complicated.

This holds both for cocurrent flow, where the streams enter from the same end, and for countercurrent flow, where they enter from different ends.

In a cross-flow, in which one system, usually the heat sink, has the same nominal temperature at all points on the heat transfer surface, a similar relation between exchanged heat and LMTD holds, but with a correction factor. A correction factor is also required for other more complex geometries, such as a shell and tube exchanger with baffles.

== Derivation ==
Assume heat transfer is occurring in a heat exchanger along an axis z, from generic coordinate A to B, between two fluids, identified as 1 and 2, whose temperatures along z are T_{1}(z) and T_{2}(z).

The local exchanged heat flux at z is proportional to the temperature difference:

$$q(z) = \alpha (T_2(z)-T_1(z)) =  \alpha\;\Delta T(z)$$

The heat that leaves the fluids causes a temperature gradient according to Fourier's law:

$$\begin{align}
\frac{d\,T_1}{dz} &= k_a (T_1(z)-T_2(z))=-k_a\,\Delta T(z) \\[4pt]
\frac{d\,T_2}{dz} &= k_b (T_2(z)-T_1(z))=k_b\,\Delta T(z)
\end{align}$$

where k_{a}, k_{b} are the thermal conductivities of the intervening material at points A and B respectively. Summed together, this becomes

| $\frac{d\Delta T}{dz}=\frac{d(T_2-T_1)}{dz}=\frac{d\,T_2}{dz}-\frac{d\,T_1}{dz}=K\Delta T(z)$ | 1 |

where K = k_{a} + k_{b}.

The total exchanged energy is found by integrating the local heat transfer q from A to B:

$$Q = D\int^{B}_{A} q(z) dz = \alpha D \int^{B}_{A} \Delta T(z) dz = \alpha D \int^{B}_{A} \Delta T \,dz,$$

Notice that B − A is clearly the pipe length, which is distance along z, and D is the circumference. Multiplying those gives Ar the heat exchanger area of the pipe, and use this fact:

$$Q = \frac{\alpha Ar}{B-A} \int^{B}_{A} \Delta T \,dz = \frac{\alpha Ar \displaystyle \int^{B}_{A} \Delta T \,dz}{\displaystyle \int^{B}_{A} \,dz}$$

In both integrals, make a change of variables from z to ΔT:

$$Q = \frac{\alpha Ar \displaystyle \int^{\Delta T(B)}_{\Delta T(A)} \Delta T \frac{dz}{d\Delta T}\,d(\Delta T)}
{\displaystyle \int^{\Delta T(B)}_{\Delta T(A)} \frac{dz}{d\Delta T}\,d(\Delta T)}$$

With the relation for ΔT (equation 1), this becomes

$$Q = \frac{\alpha Ar \displaystyle \int^{\Delta T(B)}_{\Delta T(A)} \frac{1}{K}\,d(\Delta T)}
{\displaystyle \int^{\Delta T(B)}_{\Delta T(A)} \frac{1}{K \Delta T}\,d(\Delta T)}$$

Integration at this point is trivial, and finally gives:

$$Q = \alpha \times Ar \times \frac{\Delta T(B)-\Delta T(A)}{\ln \left( \frac{\Delta T(B)}{\Delta T(A)} \right)}$$,

from which the definition of LMTD follows.

== Assumptions and limitations ==
- It has been assumed that the rate of change for the temperature of both fluids is proportional to the temperature difference; this assumption is valid for fluids with a constant specific heat, which is a good description of fluids changing temperature over a relatively small range. However, if the specific heat changes, the LMTD approach will no longer be accurate.
- A particular case for the LMTD are condensers and reboilers, where the latent heat associated to phase change is a special case of the hypothesis. For a condenser, the hot fluid inlet temperature is then equivalent to the hot fluid exit temperature.
- It has also been assumed that the heat transfer coefficient (α) is constant, and not a function of temperature. If this is not the case, the LMTD approach will again be less valid
- The LMTD is a steady-state concept, and cannot be used in dynamic analyses. In particular, if the LMTD were to be applied on a transient in which, for a brief time, the temperature difference had different signs on the two sides of the exchanger, the argument to the logarithm function would be negative, which is not allowable.
- No phase change during heat transfer
- Changes in kinetic energy and potential energy are neglected

== Logarithmic Mean Pressure Difference ==
A related quantity, the logarithmic mean pressure difference or LMPD, is often used in mass transfer for stagnant solvents with dilute solutes to simplify the bulk flow problem.
