= Horton sphere =

Spherical tank

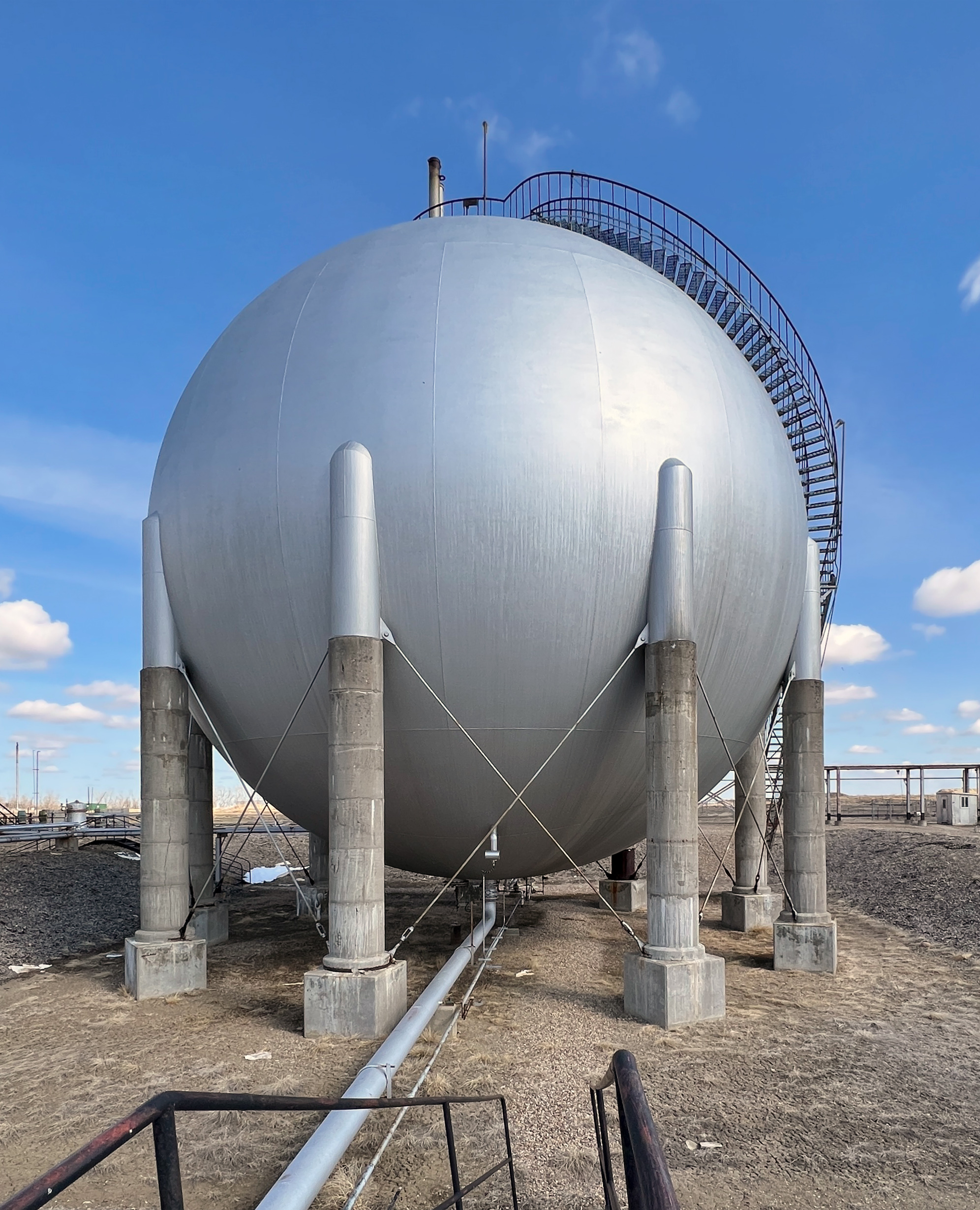
Horton Sphere in Alberta, Canada

A Horton sphere (sometimes spelled Hortonsphere), also referred to as a spherical tank or simply sphere, is a spherical pressure vessel, which is used for industrial-scale storage of liquefied gases. Example of materials that can be stored in Horton spheres are liquefied petroleum gas (LPG), liquefied natural gas (LNG), and anhydrous ammonia.

== History ==
The Horton sphere is named after Horace Ebenezer Horton (1843–1912), founder and financier of a bridge design and construction firm in about 1860, merged to form the Chicago Bridge & Iron Company (CB&I) in 1889 as a bridge building firm and constructed the first bulk liquid storage tanks in the late nineteenth and early twentieth centuries. CB&I built the first field-erected spherical pressure vessels in the world at the Port Arthur, Texas refinery in 1923, and subsequently claimed 'Hortonsphere' as a registered trademark. G.T. Horton was issued a patent on Sept 23, 1947, describing how to make the welded steel support columns resistant to thermal expansion and wind load of the sphere.

Because of their distinctive form, some have become subject to conservation campaigns such as that at Poughkeepsie, New York.

== Construction and use ==
Initially, Horton spheres were constructed by riveting together separate wrought iron or steel plates, but from the 1940s, were of welded construction. The plates are formed in roller plants and cut to patterns. Today, spherical tanks are designed to codes such as ASME VIII, PD 5500, or EN 13445.

The spherical geometry minimizes both the mechanical stress imposed on the tank walls by the internal pressure and the heat transfer through the walls. This makes spherical tanks the optimal solution for the storage of large amounts of liquefied gases, where liquefaction is achieved by pressurization, cryogenic refrigeration, or a combination thereof. Minimization of heat transfer is due to the sphere being the solid figure with the minimum surface area per unit volume. This is an advantage because it reduces the production of boil-off gas from both pressurized and refrigerated liquefied gases.

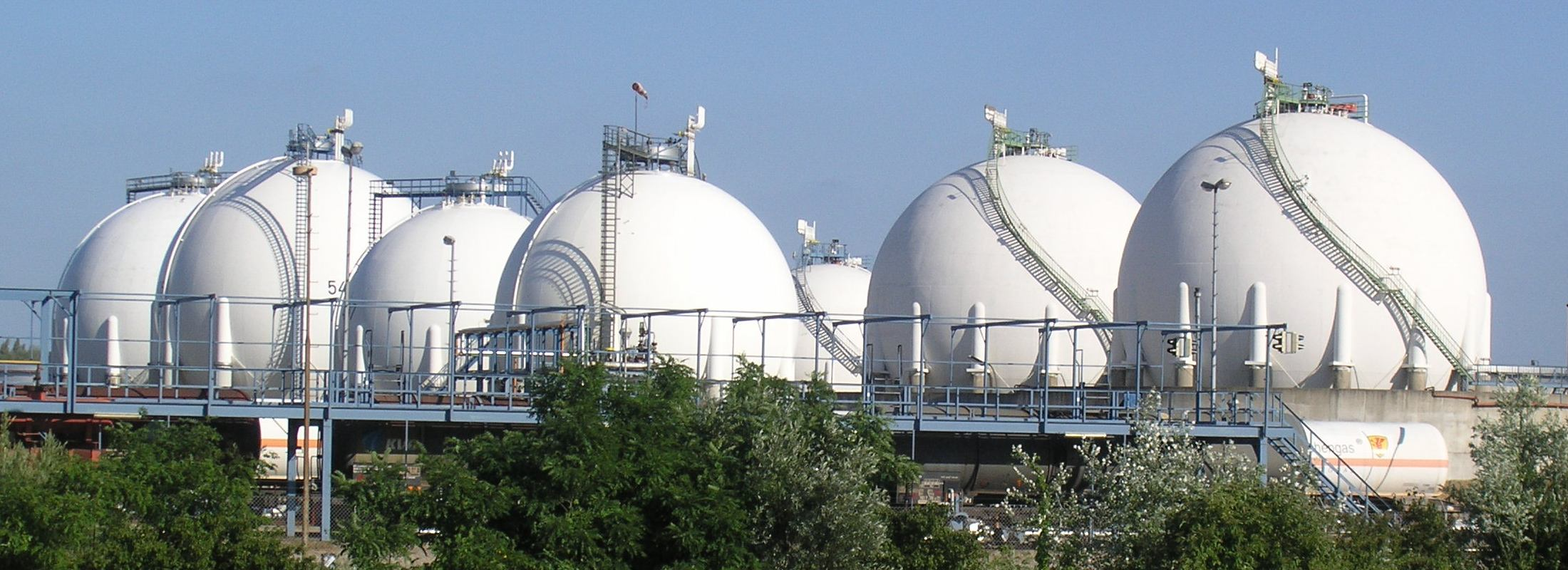
Spherical tanks at Karlsruhe MiRO petroleum refinery

Spherical tanks are used extensively for LPG and associated gases, such as propane, propylene, butane, and butadiene. They can be used for cryogenic storage of LNG, methane, ethane, ethylene, hydrogen, oxygen, nitrogen, etc.

Support is usually provided by the use of legs attached to the sphere at its equator. Legs are typically braced together with diagonal rods to provide lateral support against wind and seismic loads. Legs are fireproofed if the material is flammable. Pressure relief valves are installed at the top, from where level instrumentation is also accessed. Liquid inlet and outlet connections are at the bottom of the sphere. Bunds are usually provided around the tanks or tank clusters to contain potential leakage. However, if the gas is prone to boiling liquid vapor expanding explosions (BLEVE), spills should be directed away from the leaking tank.

Other uses have been applied to the Horton sphere including space chambers, hyperbaric chambers, environmental chambers, vacuum vessels, process vessels, test vessels, containment vessels and surge vessels.

Spherical tanks are a distinctive feature of certain sea-going gas carriers.

== See also ==
- Storage tank
