= Crystal River Nuclear Plant =

Closed nuclear power plant in Florida

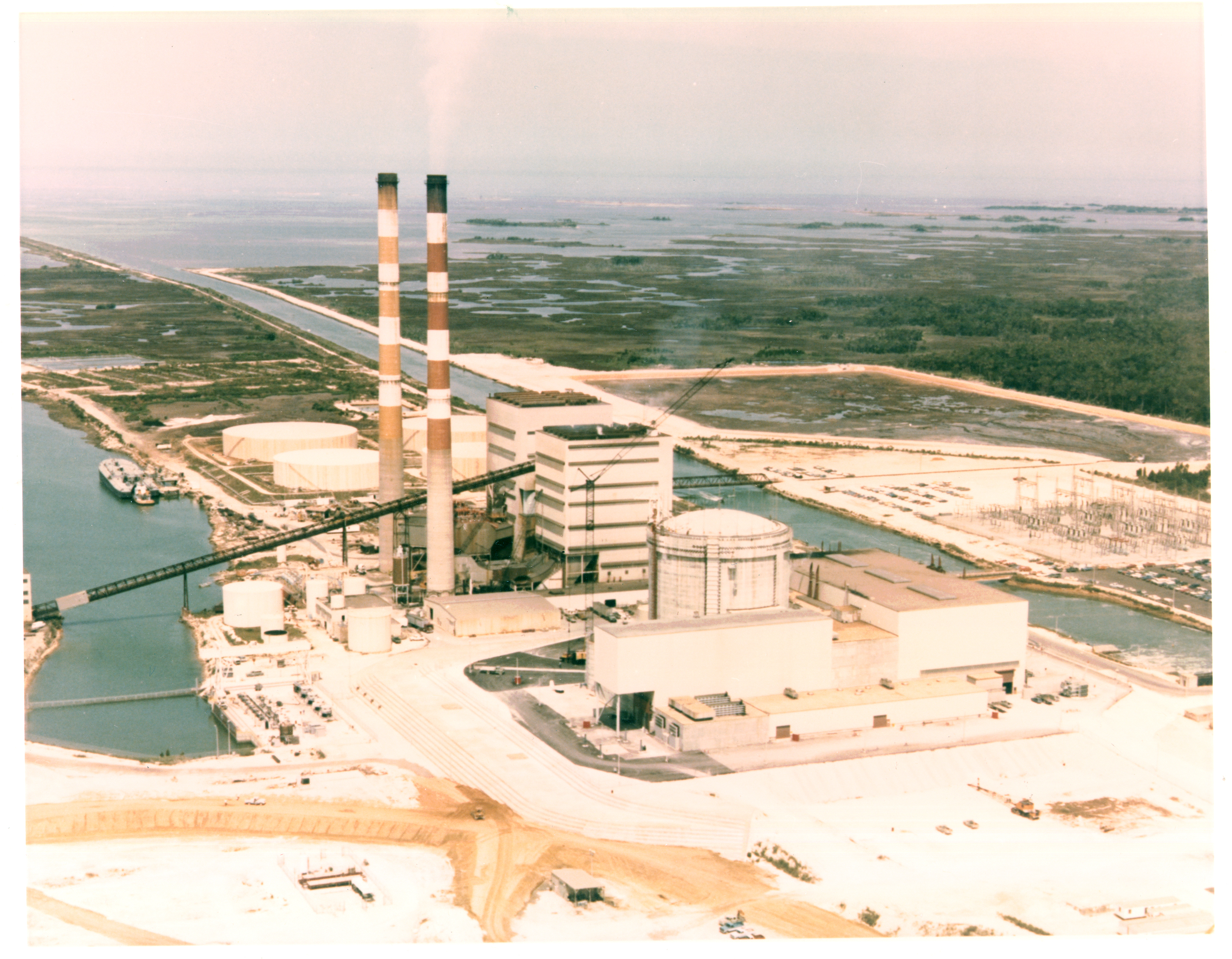
- Aerial of Crystal River Nuclear Plant
- Official name: Crystal River Nuclear Plant
- Country: United States
- Location: Crystal River, Florida
- Coordinates: 28°57.45′N 82°41.90′W
- Status: Being decommissioned
- Construction began: September 25, 1968
- Commission date: March 13, 1977
- Decommission date: –
- Construction cost: $1.436 billion (2007)
- Owner: Duke Energy
- Operator: Duke Energy

Nuclear power station
- Reactor type: PWR
- Reactor supplier: Babcock & Wilcox
- Thermal capacity: 2568

Power generation
- Nameplate capacity: 860 MW
- Capacity factor: 66.4%

External links
- Website: www.duke-energy.com/our-company/about-us/power-plants/crystal-river

The Crystal River Nuclear Plant, also called the Crystal River 3 Nuclear Power Plant, or simply CR-3, is a closed nuclear power plant located in Crystal River, Florida. As of 2013 the facility is being decommissioned, a process expected to last 60 years. The power plant was completed and licensed to operate in December 1976, and operated safely for 33 years until shutdown in September 2009. It was the third plant built as part of the 4,700-acre (1,900 ha) Crystal River Energy Complex (CREC) which contains a single nuclear power plant, while sharing the site with four operational fossil fuel power plants.

The Crystal River reactor went offline in September 2009 for refueling, OTSG replacement (once through steam generator), and 20% power up-rate outage. In preparing the containment building for making the opening to replace the two OTSG's, tendons in the containment building wall were detensioned. During the concrete removal in creating the opening workers discovered a large gap in the concrete of the containment building wall. The main cause of the gap, which further engineering analysis determined was a large delamination, was attributed to the scope and sequence of the tendon detensioning. The plant had originally been scheduled to restart in April 2011, but the project encountered a number of delays. Repairs were successful, but additional delamination began to occur in adjacent bays. After several months of analyzing options, Duke Energy senior executives announced in February 2013 that the Crystal River Nuclear Plant would be permanently shut down. The costs were estimated at $1.18 billion over the next 60 years of decommissioning.

The coal-fired units are not affected.

Crystal River was originally owned by Florida Progress Corporation (and operated by its subsidiary, Florida Power Corporation) but, in 2000, it was bought by Carolina Power & Light to form the new company, Progress Energy. Progress Energy owned 91.8% of the plant; the remainder is owned by nine municipal utilities. Effective July 2, 2012, Duke Energy purchased Progress Energy and made it a wholly owned direct unit of Duke Energy.

== Power plant and containment ==
Crystal River 3 Nuclear Power Plant was an operating 860 MWe, PWR (pressurized water reactor) plant. There are three main barriers that protect the public from the radiation hazards associated with nuclear operations. One of those barriers is known as the containment building which houses the fuel, the reactor, and the reactor cooling system. The Crystal River containment building is a steel lined post-tensioned (prestressed concrete) cylindrical concrete structure approximately 157 feet (48 m) in height with an outside diameter of about 138 feet (42 m). The containment has 42-inch thick concrete walls, has a flat foundation mat and a shallow torispherical dome. Post-tensioning is achieved by utilizing an outer array of horizontal tendons immediately adjacent to an inner array of vertical tendons that are embedded in the walls about 15 inches from the outside surface.

== Refueling outage, containment repairs and closure ==
CR-3 went offline in September 2009 for RFO-16. While the reactor was down, the old steam generators were to be replaced. There are 426 steel tendons within the concrete walls of the reactor containment dome which reinforce the dome. Plan developer Sargent & Lundy specified that 97 tendons be loosened. Progress rejected that number as excessive. The next proposal was to loosen 74 tendons, which was typical of other nuclear plants doing the procedure. According to a Progress employee, "de-tensioning the tendons is a very expensive and time-consuming effort", so the number was further reduced to 65. Progress engaged Bechtel to provide a 3rd party review, which agreed that 65 was appropriate. However, when the work was performed, only 27 tendons were loosened, and a foreman and supervisor sent emails questioning the way the tendons were loosened.

When workers began to cut the access hole for the steam generators, a crack formed. That crack was repaired, but more cracks appeared. Engineers noticed that parts of the concrete had delaminated. This was repaired, and the concrete re-tensioned, but the same problem was found in other areas. The plant had originally been due to restart in April 2011 following the uprate, but in June 2011 Progress Energy said that it did not expect it to restart until 2014. Preliminary cost estimates for the repairs was put at between $900 million and $1.3 billion, but this estimate was later called into question by Duke Energy. In October 2012 an independent review estimated the repair cost at $1.5 billion, with a worst-case scenario of $3.4 billion. In February 2013 Duke Energy announced that Crystal River would be permanently shut down and that they will recover $850 million in insurance claims. A Duke spokesperson stated, "The company sought input from numerous engineering experts — internally and externally — and used proven industry-accepted practices when determining how to replace the steam generators. Analysis has shown that the 2009 delamination (cracking) could not have been predicted. The U.S. Nuclear Regulatory Commission confirmed these findings."

Gregory Jaczko, former chairman of the Nuclear Regulatory Commission, stated, "That's a multi-billion dollar asset that had to be shut down because of improper work planning, improper understanding of how to properly do this containment retrofit".

== Surrounding population ==
The NRC defines two emergency planning zones around nuclear power plants: a plume exposure pathway zone with a radius of 10 miles (16 km), concerned primarily with exposure to, and inhalation of, airborne radioactive contamination, and an ingestion pathway zone of about 50 miles (80 km), concerned primarily with ingestion of food and liquid contaminated by radioactivity.

The 2010 U.S. population within 10 miles (16 km) of Crystal River was 20,695, an increase of 50.9 percent in a decade, according to an analysis of U.S. Census data for msnbc.com. The 2010 U.S. population within 50 miles (80 km) was 1,046,741, an increase of 32.4 percent since 2000. Cities within 50 miles include Ocala, (38 miles (61 km) to city center) and Spring Hill (34 miles (55 km) to city center).

== Seismic risk ==
On September 10, 2006, a magnitude 5.8 earthquake occurred 300 miles southwest of the nuclear plant, no damage occurred to the Crystal River Nuclear Power Plant from the rare quake. The odds of such a quake happening again in the near-term around Florida are low.

The NRC's estimate of the risk each year of an earthquake intense enough to cause core damage to the reactor at Crystal River was 1 in 45,455, according to an NRC study published in August 2010.

== See also ==
- Progress Energy Inc
- Levy County Nuclear Power Plant
