= Air tank =

Air tank may refer to:

- Diving cylinder, used by scuba divers to hold air and other breathing gases at high pressure underwater
- Pneumatic pressure vessel, for storing compressed air to operate equipment such as braking systems, paint dispensers and paintball guns
