= China Dalian International Economic and Technical Cooperation Group =

China Dalian International Economic & Technical Cooperation Group Co., Ltd.
- Native name: 中国大连国际经济技术合作集团有限公司
- Headquarters: Dalian, Liaoning, China
- Key people: Yangping Liu (Chairman)
- Website: www.china-cdig.com

China Dalian International Economic & Technical Cooperation Group (abbreviated as CDIG) is a Chinese enterprise involved in construction and engineering, real estate development, shipping, import and export trading, fishing, aquaculture and aquatic products processing.

The construction division is heavily focused on international markets, earning $529.1 million in revenue in 2012, of which $469.8 million came from overseas projects. It operates in markets from Syria to Suriname. In Syria, it signed a deal in 2008 to expand the number of spherical tanks storing liquefied petroleum gas (LPG) in the coastal city of Banias. The company went on to construct 4 spheres in 2009 and then 3 more in 2010. A New York Times article in 2011 cited the construction work carried out by the company in performing road maintenance work in Suriname as an example of the growth of the Chinese community in the country.

The company plans to develop a wind power project in Tanzania in 2014. The $136 million project is planned to generate electricity in the Sinigida region by 2015. Construction will take place in two phases, a 50 MW first phase and then a 150 MW second phase, and by the company's account create jobs for 1,000 Tanzanians and require construction of 17 km of roads.

The company was privatized on January 8, 2010.
