= LPFT =

LPFT is an acronym that can refer to:

- the lowest possible fluid temperature in a piping system or pressure vessel
- the low pressure fuel turbopump of a space shuttle hydrogen fuel system
- the local polynomial Fourier transform, which is a high-order generalization of the short-time Fourier transform
