= PD 5500 =

Specification for unfired pressure vessels

PD 5500 is a specification for unfired pressure vessels. It specifies requirements for the design, manufacture, inspection and testing of unfired pressure vessels made from carbon, ferritic alloy, and austenitic steels. It also includes material supplements containing requirements for vessels made from aluminium, copper, nickel, titanium and duplex. PD 5500 is the UK’s national pressure vessels code, although the code is used outside the UK. A new edition of PD5500 is published every three years. An amendment is usually published every year in September.

BS5500 was declassified as a full British Standard and reclassified as a 'Publicly Available Specification', which lead to it being renamed to PD5500. PD5500 was withdrawn from the list of British Standards because it was not harmonized with the European Pressure Equipment Directive (2014/68/EU formerly 97/23/EC) . EN 13445 was introduced as the harmonized standard. Harmonized standards carry presumed conformity with the requirements of the Pressure Equipment Directive, whereas other pressure vessel design codes such as PD5500 or ASME must demonstrate conformity against each of the Essential Safety Requirements of the Pressure Equipment Directive before conformity can be declared. PD5500 is currently published as a "Published Document" (PD) by the British Standards Institution.

== Brexit ==
In the UK the Pressure Equipment Safety Regulations 2016 enacted the PED into UK law. Since the UK exited the European Union, the PED no longer applies and the Pressure Equipment Safety Regulations 2016 have been amended by the enactment of the UK Product Safety and Metrology Regulations, which update a number of pieces of legislation which required amendments to operate outside of the EU. Under this new legislation Harmonised Standards are now referred to as Designated Standards, but the practice of demonstrating compliance remains largely the same. EN 13445 is recognised as a Designated Standard, while other codes such as PD5500 must still demonstrate conformity against each Essential Safety Requirement.

== See also ==
- Pressure Equipment Directive
- Pressure Equipment Safety Regulations
- The Product Safety and Metrology etc. (Amendment etc.) (EU Exit) Regulations 2019
- PD5500 - British Standard Institute
