= Head (vessel) =

End cap on a cylindrically shaped pressure vessel

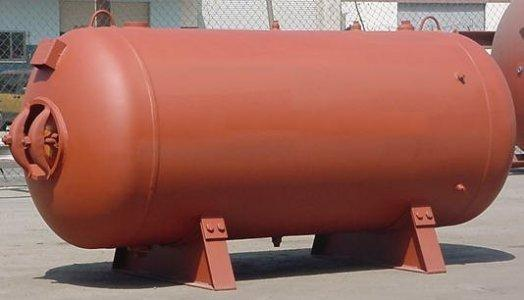
Steel pressure vessel

A head is one of the end caps on a cylindrically shaped pressure vessel.

== Principle ==
Vessel dished ends are mostly used in storage or pressure vessels in industry. These ends, which in upright vessels are the bottom and the top, use less space than a hemisphere (which is the ideal form for pressure containments) while requiring only a slightly thicker wall.

== Manufacturing ==
The manufacturing of such an end is easier than that of a hemisphere. The starting material is first pressed to a radius r_{1} and then curled at the edge creating the second radius r_{2}. Vessel dished ends can also be welded together from smaller pieces.

== Shapes ==
The shape of the heads used can vary. The most common head shapes are:

=== Hemispherical head ===
A sphere is the ideal shape for a head, because the stresses are distributed evenly through the material of the head. The radius (r) of the head equals the radius of the cylindrical part of the vessel.

=== Ellipsoidal head ===
This is also called an elliptical head. The shape of this head is more economical, because the height of the head is just a fraction of the diameter. Its radius varies between the major and minor axis; usually the ratio is 2:1.

=== Semi–Ellipsoidal Dished Heads ===
2:1 Semi-Ellipsoidal dished heads are deeper and stronger than the more popular torispherical dished heads. The greater depth results in the head being more difficult to form, and this makes them more expensive to manufacture. However, the cost is offset by a potential reduction in the specified thickness due to the dished head having greater overall strength and resistance to pressure.

=== Torispherical head (or flanged and dished head) ===
These heads have a dish with a fixed radius (r1), the size of which depends on the type of torispherical head. The transition between the cylinder and the dish is called the knuckle. The knuckle has a toroidal shape. The most common types of torispherical heads are:

==== ASME F&D head ====
Commonly used for ASME pressure vessels, these torispherical heads have a crown radius equal to the outside diameter of the head ($r_1=Do$), and a knuckle radius equal to 6% of the outside diameter ($r_2=0.06\times Do$). The ASME design code does not allow the knuckle radius to be any less than 6% of the outside diameter.

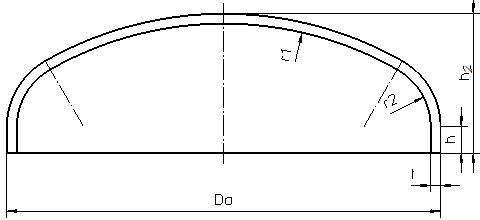
Schematic of a torispherical head - specifically a Klöpper head

==== Klöpper head ====
This is a torispherical head. The dish has a radius that equals the diameter of the cylinder it is attached to ($r_1=Do$). The knuckle has a radius that equals a tenth of the diameter of the cylinder ($r_2=0.1\times Do$), hence its alternative designation "decimal head".

Also other sizes are: $h \ge3.5\times t$ ,(page13) rest of height ($h_2$) $h_2=0.1935\times Do-0.455\times t$ .

==== Korbbogen head ====
This is a torispherical head also named Semi ellipsoidal head (According to DIN 28013). The radius of the dish is 80% of the diameter of the cylinder ($r_1=0.8\times Do$). The radius of the knuckle is ($r_2=0.154\times Do$).

Also other sizes are $h \ge3\times t$, rest of height ($h_2$) $h_2=0.255\times Do-0.635\times t$. This shape finds its origin in architecture; see Korbbogen, architectural information.

==== 80-10 head ====
These heads have a crown radius of 80% of outside diameter, and a knuckle radius of 10% of outside diameter.

=== Flat head ===
This is a head consisting of a toroidal knuckle connecting to a flat plate. This type of head is typically used for the bottom of cookware.

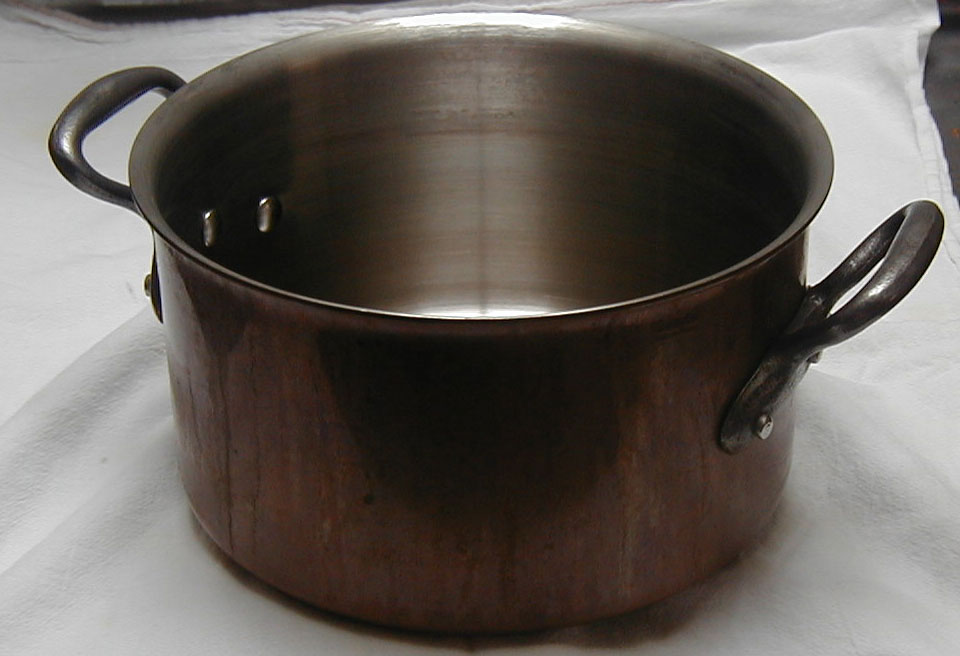
Pans typically have a bottom in the shape of a flat head

=== Diffuser head ===
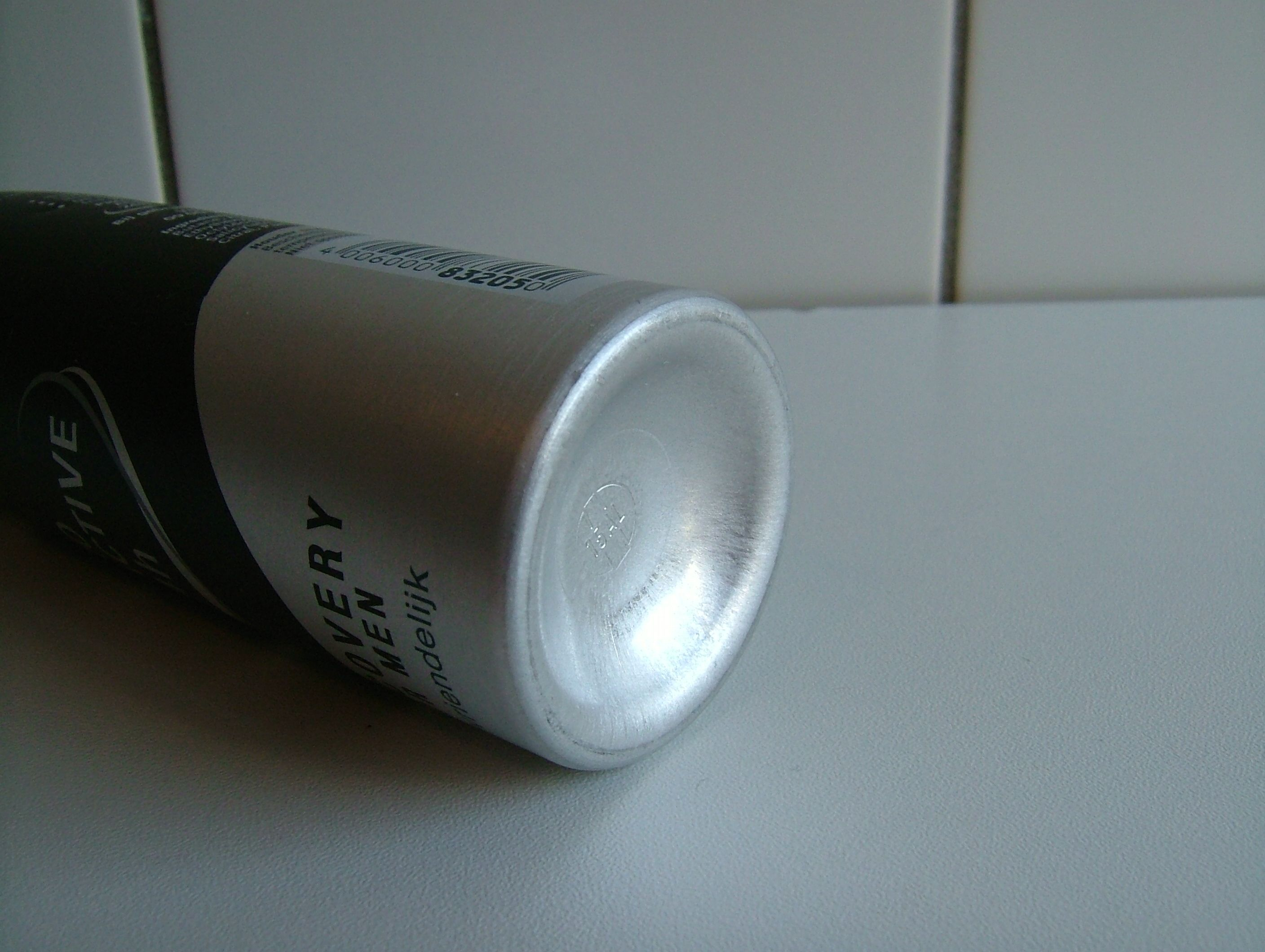
Typical application of a diffuser head: the bottom of an aerosol spray can

This type of head is often found on the bottom of aerosol spray cans. It is an inverted torispherical head.

=== Conical head ===
This is a cone-shaped head.

== Heat treatment ==
Heat treatment may be required after cold forming, but not for heads formed by hot forming.
