= Minimum design metal temperature =

MDMT is one of the design conditions for pressure vessels engineering calculations, design and manufacturing according to the ASME Boilers and Pressure Vessels Code. Each pressure vessel that conforms to the ASME code has its own MDMT, and this temperature is stamped on the vessel nameplate. The precise definition can sometimes be a little elaborate, but in simple terms the MDMT is a temperature arbitrarily selected by the user of type of fluid and the temperature range the vessel is going to handle. The so-called arbitrary MDMT must be lower than or equal to the CET (which is an environmental or "process" property, see below) and must be higher than or equal to the (MDMT)_{M} (which is a material property).

Critical exposure temperature (CET) is the lowest anticipated temperature to which the vessel will be subjected, taking into consideration lowest operating temperature, operational upsets, autorefrigeration, atmospheric temperature, and any other sources of cooling. In some cases it may be the lowest temperature at which significant stresses will occur and not the lowest possible temperature.

(MDMT)_{M} is the lowest temperature permitted according to the metallurgy of the vessel fabrication materials and the thickness of the vessel component, that is, according to the low temperature embrittlement range and the charpy impact test requirements per temperature and thickness, for each one of the vessel's components.
