= Pressure Equipment Directive (EU) =

2014 European Union standards directive

The Pressure Equipment Directive (PED) 2014/68/EU (formerly 97/23/EC) of the EU sets out the standards for the design and fabrication of pressure equipment ("pressure equipment" means steam boilers, pressure vessels, piping, safety valves and other components and assemblies subject to pressure loading) generally over one liter in volume and having a maximum pressure more than 0.5 bar gauge. It also sets the administrative procedures requirements for the "conformity assessment" of pressure equipment, for the free placing on the European market without local legislative barriers. It has been mandatory throughout the EU since 30 May 2002, with 2014 revision fully effective as of 19 July 2016. The standards and regulations regarding pressure vessels and boiler safety are also very close to the US standards, as described in the ASME BPVC, which is defined by the American Society of Mechanical Engineers (ASME). This enables most international inspection agencies to provide both verification and certification services to assess compliance to the different pressure equipment directives. From the pressure vessel manufactures PED does not generally require a prior manufacturing permit/certificate/stamp as ASME does.

== Contents ==
1. Scope and Definitions (including exemptions of its scope)
2. Market surveillance
3. Technical requirements: classification of pressure equipment according to type and content.
4. Free movement
5. Presumption of conformity
6. Committee on technical standards and regulations
7. Committee on Pressure Equipment
8. Safeguard clause
9. Classification of pressure equipment
10. Conformity assessment
11. European approval for materials
12. Notified bodies
13. Recognized third-party organisations
14. User inspectorates
15. CE marking
16. Unduly affixed CE marking
17. International co-operation
18. Decisions entailing refusal or restriction
19. Repeal
20. Transposition and transitional provisions
21. Addressees of the Directive: the EU member states for implementation in national laws and/or regulations.
- Annex I: Essential safety requirements
  1. General
  2. Design
  3. Manufacturing
  4. Materials
  5. Fired or otherwise heated pressure equipment with a risk of overheating (article 3.1)
  6. Piping
  7. Specific quantitative requirements for certain pressure equipment
- Appendix II: Conformity assessment tables. Actually diagrams of pressure vs. volume (or diameter for pipes), for classification of equipment in four classes.
- Appendix III: Conformity assessment procedures
- Appendix IV: Minimum criteria to be met when designating the notified bodies (article 12) and the recognised third party organisations (article 13)
- Appendix V: Criteria to be met when authorising user inspectorates (article 14)
- Appendix VI: CE marking
- Appendix VII: Declaration of conformity

== Transition to Directive 2014/68/EU ==
Directive 97/23/EC was fully superseded by directive 2014/68/EU from 20 July 2016 onwards. Article 13 of the new directive (classification of pressure equipment) became effective 1 June 2015, replacing article 9 of directive 97/23/EC.

== UK implementation ==
In the UK the Pressure Equipment (Safety) Regulations 2016 PE(S)R (Formerly Pressure Equipment Regulations 1999 (PER)) and the Pressure Systems Safety Regulations 2000 apply: see Health and safety regulations in the United Kingdom. The Health and Safety Executive and the Health and Safety Executive for Northern Ireland are the named enforcement authorities. Some of the provisions included in PE(S)R 2016 apply differently in NI for as long as the Northern Ireland Protocol is in force after UK existing EU.

== See also ==
- Pressure vessel
- EN 13445
