= ASME Boiler and Pressure Vessel Code =

Technical standard

The ASME Boiler and Pressure Vessel Code (BPVC) is a set of standards published by the American Society of Mechanical Engineers (ASME) that provides rules for the design, fabrication, inspection, testing, and certification of boilers and pressure vessels.

The BPVC is developed and updated through a consensus process managed by ASME committees, with participation from volunteer technical experts representing industry, regulators, and other stakeholders.

ASME also operates a conformity assessment and certification system under which accredited organizations—including manufacturers and authorized inspection agencies—may apply ASME Code Symbol Stamps to equipment that meets BPVC requirements.

== History ==
The BPVC was created in response to public outcry after several serious explosions in the state of Massachusetts. A fire-tube boiler exploded at the Grover Shoe Factory in Brockton, Massachusetts, on March 20, 1905, which resulted in the deaths of 58 people and injured 150. Then on December 6, 1906, a boiler in the factory of the P.J. Harney Shoe Company exploded in Lynn, Massachusetts. As a result, the state of Massachusetts enacted the first legal code based on ASME's rules for the construction of steam boilers in 1907.

ASME convened the Board of Boiler Rules before it became the ASME Boiler Code Committee which was formed in 1911. This committee put in the form work for the first edition of the ASME Boiler Code - Rules for the Construction of Stationary Boilers and for the Allowable Working Pressures, which was issued in 1914 and published in 1915.

The first edition of the Boiler and Pressure Vessel Code, known as the 1914 edition, was a single 114-page volume. It developed over time into the ASME Boiler and Pressure Vessel code, which today has over 92,000 copies in use, in over 100 countries around the world. As of March 2011 the document consisted of 16,000 pages in 28 volumes.

After the first edition of the Code, the verifications required by the Code were performed by independent inspectors, which resulted in a wide range of interpretations. Hence in February 1919, the National Board of Boiler and Pressure Vessel Inspectors was formed.

ASME BPVC TIMELINE
Year	Activity
1880	The American Society of Mechanical Engineers is founded
1884	First performance test code: Code for the Conduct of Trials of Steam Boilers
1900	First revision of an ASME standard, Standard Method of Conducting Steam Boiler Tests
1911	Establishment of a committee to propose a Boiler Code
1913	New Committee to revise the Boiler Code
1914	Issuance of the first Boiler Code
1915	Standards for Specifications and Construction of Boilers and Other Containing Vessels in Which High Pressure is Contained
1919	National Board of Boiler and Pressure Vessel Inspectors formed
1924	Code for Unfired Pressure Vessels
1930	Test Code of Complete Steam-Electric Power Plants
1956	Committee established for ASME Pressure Vessel Code for Nuclear Age
1963	Section III (Nuclear Power) of ASME Boiler and Pressure Vessel Code
1968	ASME Nuclear Power Certificate of Authorization Program commences
1972	ASME expands its certification program worldwide; first ASME manufacturer certification issued outside of North America
1978	First ASME publication of Boiler and Pressure Vessel Committee interpretations
1983	ASME Boiler and Pressure Vessel Code published in both conventional and metric units
1989	Boiler and Pressure Vessel Code published on CD-ROM
1992	First Authorized Inspection Agency accredited
1996	Risk technology introduced into the Boiler and Pressure Vessel Code
1997	High Pressure Vessel Code
2000	C&S Connect (on-line balloting and tracking system) launched for Boiler and_Pressure Vessel Committees
2007	ISO TC11 Standard 16528—Boilers and Pressure Vessels published, establishing performance requirements for the construction of boilers and pressure vessels and facilitating registration of BPV Codes to this standard
2007	High density polyethylene plastic pipe introduced into the Boiler and Pressure Vessel Code, Section III, Code Case N-755
2009	ASME Boiler and Pressure Vessel Committee reorganized from one consensus body to ten consensus bodies
2015	High density polyethylene plastic pipe incorporated into Boiler and Pressure Vessel Code, Section III, Mandatory Appendix XXVI

== Code Sections ==
LIST OF SECTIONS

The following is the structure of the 2021 Edition of the BPV Code:

- ASME BPVC Section I - Rules for Construction of Power Boilers
- ASME BPVC Section II - Materials

- Part A - Ferrous Material Specifications
- Part B - Nonferrous Material Specifications
- Part C - Specifications for Welding Rods, Electrodes, and Filler Metals
- Part D - Properties (Customary)
- Part D - Properties (Metric)

- ASME BPVC Section III - Rules for Construction of Nuclear Facility Components

- Subsection NCA - General Requirements for Division 1 and Division 2
- Appendices
- Division 1

- Subsection NB - Class 1 Components
- Subsection NCD - Class 2 and Class 3 Components
- Subsection NE - Class MC Components
- Subsection NF - Supports
- Subsection NG - Core Support Structures

- Division 2 - Code for Concrete Containments
- Division 3 - Containment Systems & Transport Packagings for Spent Nuclear Fuel &High Level Radioactive Waste
- Division 5 - High Temperature Reactors

- ASME BPVC Section IV - Rules for Construction of Heating Boilers
- ASME BPVC Section V - Nondestructive Examination
- ASME BPVC Section VI - Recommended Rules for the Care and Operation of Heating Boilers
- ASME BPVC Section VII - Recommended Guidelines for the Care of Power Boilers
- ASME BPVC Section VIII - Rules for Construction of Pressure Vessels

- Division 1 - Rules for Construction of Pressure Vessels
- Division 2 - Alternative Rules
- Division 3 - Alternative Rules for Construction of High Pressure Vessels

- ASME BPVC Section IX - Qualification Standard for Welding, Brazing, and Fusing Procedures; Welders; Brazers; and Welding, Brazing, and Fusing Operators
- ASME BPVC Section X - Fiber-Reinforced Plastic Pressure Vessels
- ASME BPVC Section XI - Rules for Inservice Inspection of Nuclear Power Plant Components

- Division 1 - Rules for Inspection and Testing of Components of Light-Water-Cooled Plants
- Division 2 - Requirements for Reliability and Integrity Management (RIM) Programs for Nuclear Power Plants

- ASME BPVC Section XII - Rules for the Construction and Continued Service of Transport Tanks
- ASME BPVC Section XIII - Rules for Overpressure Protection
- ASME BPVC Code Cases - Boilers and Pressure Vessels

ADDENDA

Addenda, which include additions and revisions to the individual Sections of the Code, are issued accordingly for a particular edition of the code up until the next edition. Addenda is no longer in use since Code Edition 2013. It has been replaced by two years edition period.

INTERPRETATIONS

ASME's interpretations to submitted technical queries relevant to a particular Section of the Code are issued accordingly. Interpretations are also available through the internet.

CODES CASES

Code Cases provide rules that permit the use of materials and alternative methods of construction that are not covered by existing BPVC rules. For those Cases that have been adopted will appear in the appropriate Code Cases book: "Boilers and Pressure Vessels" and "Nuclear Components."

Codes Cases are usually intended to be incorporated in the Code in a later edition. When it is used, the Code Case specifies mandatory requirements which must be met as it would be with the Code. There are some jurisdictions that do not automatically accept Code Cases.

== ASME BPVC Section II - Materials ==
The section of the ASME BPVC consists of 4 parts.

Part A - Ferrous Material Specifications

This Part is a supplementary book referenced by other sections of the Code. It provides material specifications for ferrous materials which are suitable for use in the construction of pressure vessels.

The specifications contained in this Part specify the mechanical properties, heat treatment, heat and product chemical composition and analysis, test specimens, and methodologies of testing. The designation of the specifications start with 'SA' and a number which is taken from the ASTM 'A' specifications.

Part B - Nonferrous Material Specifications

This Part is a supplementary book referenced by other sections of the Code. It provides material specifications for nonferrous materials which are suitable for use in the construction of pressure vessels.

The specifications contained in this Part specify the mechanical properties, heat treatment, heat and product chemical composition and analysis, test specimens, and methodologies of testing. The designation of the specifications start with 'SB' and a number which is taken from the ASTM 'B' specifications.

Part C - Specifications for Welding Rods, Electrodes, and Filler Metals

This Part is a supplementary book referenced by other sections of the Code. It provides mechanical properties, heat treatment, heat and product chemical composition and analysis, test specimens, and methodologies of testing for welding rods, filler metals and electrodes used in the construction of pressure vessels.

The specifications contained in this Part are designated with 'SFA' and a number which is taken from the American Welding Society (AWS) specifications.

Part D - Properties (Customary/Metric)

This Part is a supplementary book referenced by other sections of the Code. It provides tables for the design stress values, tensile and yield stress values as well as tables for material properties (Modulus of Elasticity, Coefficient of heat transfer et al.)

== ASME BPVC Section III - Rules for Construction of Nuclear Facility Components ==
Section III of the ASME Code Address the rules for construction of nuclear facility components and supports. The components and supports covered by section III are intended to be installed in a nuclear power system that serves the purpose of producing and controlling the output of thermal energy from nuclear fuel and those associated systems essential to safety of nuclear power system. Section III provides requirements for new construction of nuclear power system considering mechanical and thermal stresses due to cyclic operation. Deterioration, which may occur in service as result of radiation effects, corrosion, or instability of the material, is typically not addressed.

- Subsection NCA (General Requirements for Division 1 and Division 2)

- NCA-1000 Scope of Section III
- NCA-2000 Classification of Components and Supports
- NCA-3000 Responsibilities and Duties
- NCA-4000 Quality Assurance
- NCA-5000 Authorized Inspection
- NCA-8000 Certificates, Nameplates, Code Symbol Stamping, and Data Reports
- NCA-9000 Glossary

- Division 1- Metallic Components

- Subsection NB Class 1 components (Those components that are part of the fluid-retaining pressure boundary of the reactor coolant system. Failure of this pressure boundary would violate the integrity of the reactor coolant pressure boundary)

- Reactor Pressure Vessel
- Pressurizer Vessel
- Steam Generators
- Reactor Coolant Pumps
- Reactor Coolant Piping
- Line Valves
- Safety Valves

- Subsection NC Class 2 components (Those components that are not part of the reactor coolant pressure boundary, but are important for reactor shutdown, emergency core cooling, post-accident containment heat removal, or post-accident fission product removal)

- Emergency Core Cooling
- Post Accident Heat Removal
- Post Accident Fission Product Removal

- Includes Vessels, Pumps, Valves, Piping, Storage Tanks, and Supports

- Subsection ND Class 3 components (Those components that are not part of class 1 or 2 but are important to safety)

- Cooling Water Systems
- Auxiliary Feedwater Systems

- Includes Vessels, Pumps, Valves, Piping, Storage Tanks, and Supports

- Subsection NE Class MC supports

- Containment Vessel
- Penetration Assemblies (Does not include piping, pumps and valves which if passing through the containment must be class 1 or class 2)

- Subsection NF Supports

- Plate and Shell Type
- Linear Type
- Standard Supports

- Support Class is the class of the Component Supported

- Subsection NG Core Support Structures (class CS)

- Core Support Structures
- Reactor Vessel Internals

- Subsection NH Class 1 Components in Elevated Temperature Service (Those components that are used in elevated temperature service)

- Elevated Temperature Components
- Service Temperature over 800°F

- Appendices

== ASME BPVC Section V - Nondestructive Examination ==
This section of the ASME BPVC contains the requirements for nondestructive examinations which are referred and required by other sections of the Code.

It also covers the suppliers examination responsibilities, requirements of the authorized inspectors (AI) as well as the requirements for the qualification of personnel, inspection and examinations.

== ASME BPVC Section VIII - Rules for Construction of Pressure Vessels ==
This section of the ASME BPVC consists of 3 divisions.

=== ASME Section VIII Division 1 ===
Div. 1 covers the mandatory requirements, specific prohibitions and nonmandatory guidance for materials, design, fabrication, inspection and testing, markings and reports, overpressure protection and certification of pressure vessels having an internal or external pressure which exceeds 15 psi (100 kPa). Pressure vessels covered by this division can be either fired or unfired. The pressure may be from external sources, or by the application of heating from an indirect or direct source, or any combination thereof.

The division is not numbered in the traditional method (Part 1, Part 2 etc.) but is structured with Subsections and Parts which consist of letters followed by a number. The structure is as follows:

- Subsection A - General Requirements

- Part UG - General Requirements for All Methods of Construction and All Materials

- Materials: UG-4 through to UG-15
- Design: UG-16 through to UG-35
- Openings and Reinforcements: UG-36 through to UG-46
- Braced and Stayed Surfaces: UG-47 through to UG-50
- Fabrication: UG-75 through to UG-85
- Inspection and Tests: UG-90 through to UG-103
- Marking and Reports: UG-115 through to UG-120
- Overpressure Protection: UG125 through to UG-140

- Subsection B - Requirements Pertaining to Methods of Fabrication of Pressure Vessels

- Part UW - Requirements for Pressure Vessels Fabricated by Welding

- General: UW-1 through to UW-3
- Materials: UW-5
- Design: UW-8 through to UW-21
- Fabrication: UW-26 through to UW-42
- Inspection and Tests: UW-46 through to UW-54
- Marking and Reports: UW-60
- Pressure Relief Devices: UW-65

- Part UF - Requirements for Pressure Vessels Fabricated by Forging

- General: UF-1
- Materials: UF-5 through to UF-7
- Design: UF-12 through to UF-25
- Fabrication: UF-26 through to UF-43
- Inspection and Tests: UF-45 through to UF-55
- Marking and Reports: UF-115
- Pressure Relief Devices: UF-125

- Part UB - Requirements for Pressure Vessels Fabricated by Brazing

- General: UB-1 through to UB-3
- Materials: UB-5 through to UB-7
- Design: UB-9 through to UB-22
- Fabrication: UB-30 through to UB-37
- Inspection and Tests: UB-40 through to UB-50
- Marking and Reports: UB-55
- Pressure Relief Devices: UB-60

- Subsection C - Requirements Pertaining to Classes of Materials

- Part UCS - Requirements for Pressure Vessels Constructed of Carbon and Low Alloy Steels

- General: UCS-1
- Materials: UCS-5 through to UCS-12
- Design: UCS-16 through to UCS-57
- Low Temperature Operation: UCS-65 through to UCS-68

1:* Fabrication: UCS-75 through to UCS-85

- Inspection and Tests: UCS-90
- Marking and Reports: UCS-115
- Pressure Relief Devices: UCS-125
- Nonmandatory Appendix CS: UCS-150 through to UCS-160

- Part UNF - Requirements for Pressure Vessels Constructed of Nonferrous Materials

- General: UNF-1 through to UNF-4
- Materials: UNF-5 through to UNF-15
- Design: UNF-16 through to UNF-65
- Fabrication: UNF-75 through to UNF-79
- Inspection and Tests: UNF-90 through to UNF-95
- Marking and Reports: UNF-115
- Pressure Relief Devices: UNF-125
- Appendix NF: Characteristics of the Nonferrous Materials (Informative and Nonmandatory)

- Part UHA Requirements for Pressure Vessels Constructed of High Alloy Steel

- General: UHA-1 through to UHA-8
- Materials: UHA-11 through to UHA-13
- Design: UHA-20 through to UHA-34
- Fabrication: UHA-40 through to UHA-44
- Inspection and Tests: UHA-50 through to UHA-52
- Marking and Reports: UHA-60
- Pressure Relief Devices: UHA-65
- Appendix HA: Suggestions on the Selection and Treatment of Austenitic Chromium–Nickel and Ferritic and Martensitic High Chromium Steels (Informative and Nonmandatory)

- Part UCI - Requirements for Pressure Vessels Constructed of Cast Iron

- General: UCI-1 through to UCI-3
- Materials: UCI-5 through to UCI-12
- Design: UCI-16 through to UCI-37
- Fabrication: UCI-75 through to UCI-78
- Inspection and Tests: UCI-90 through to UCI-101
- Marking and Reports: UCI-115
- Pressure Relief Devices: UCI-125

- Part UCL - Requirements for Welded Pressure Vessels Constructed of Material With Corrosion Resistant Integral Cladding, Weld Metal Overlay Cladding, or With Applied Linings

- General: UCL-1 through to UCL-3
- Materials: UCL-10 through to UCL-12
- Design: UCL-20 through to UCL-27
- Fabrication: UCL-30 through to UCL-46
- Inspection and Tests: UCL-50 through to UCL-52
- Marking and Reports: UCL-55
- Pressure Relief Devices: UCL-60

- Part UCD - Requirements for Pressure Vessels Constructed of Cast Ductile Iron

- General: UCD-1 through to UCD-3
- Materials: UCD-5 through to UCD-12
- Design: UCD-16 through to UCD-37
- Fabrication: UCD-75 through to UCD-78
- Inspection and Tests: UCD-90 through to UCD-101
- Marking and Reports: UCD-115
- Pressure Relief Devices: UCD-125

- Part UHT Requirements for Pressure Vessels Constructed of Ferritic Steels With Tensile Properties Enhanced by Heat Treatment.

- General: UHT-1
- Materials: UHT-5 through to UHT-6
- Design: UHT-16 through to UHT-57
- Fabrication: UHT-75 through to UHT-86
- Inspection and Tests: UHT-90
- Marking and Reports: UHT-115
- Pressure Relief Devices: UHT-125

- Part ULW Requirements for Pressure Vessels Fabricated by Layered Construction

- Introduction: ULW-1 through to ULW-2
- Materials: ULW-5
- Design: ULW-16 through to ULW-26
- Welding: ULW-31 through to ULW-33

2:* Nondestructive Examination of Welded Joints: ULW-50 through to ULW-57

- Fabrication: ULW-75 through to ULW-78
- Inspection and Tests: ULW-90
- Marking and Reports: ULW-115
- Pressure Relief Devices: ULW-125

- Part ULT Alternative Rules for Pressure Vessels Constructed of Materials Having Higher Allowable Stresses at Low Temperature

- General: ULT-1 through to ULT-5
- Design: ULT-16 through to ULT-57
- Fabrication: ULT-76 through to ULT-86
- Inspection and Tests: ULT-90 through to ULT-100
- Marking and Reports: ULT-115
- Pressure Relief Devices: ULT-125

- Part UHX - Rules for Shell-and-Tube Heat Exchangers
- Part UIG - Requirements for Pressure Vessels Constructed of Impregnated Graphite

- General: UIG-1 through to UIG-3
- Materials: UIG-5 through to UIG-8
- Design: UIG-22 through to UIG-60
- Fabrication: UIG-75 through to UIG-84
- Inspection and Tests: UIG-90 through to UIG-112
- Marking and Reports: UIG-115 through to UIG-121

3:* Pressure Relief Devices: UIG-125

- MANDATORY APPENDICES: 1 through to 48
- NONMANDATORY APPENDICES: A through to PP

=== Division 2 - Alternative Rules ===
This division covers the mandatory requirements, specific prohibitions and nonmandatory guidance for materials, design, fabrication, inspection and testing, markings and reports, overpressure protection and certification of pressure vessels having an internal or external pressure which exceeds 3000 psi (20700 kPa) but less than 10,000 psi.

The pressure vessels can be either fired or unfired. The pressure may be from external sources, or by the application of heating from an indirect or direct source as a result of a process, or any combination of the two.

The rules contained in this section can be used as an alternative to the minimum requirements specified in Division 1. Generally the Division 2 rules are more onerous than in Division 1 with respect to materials, design and nondestructive examinations but higher design stress intensity values are allowed. Division 2 has also provisions for the use of finite element analysis to determine expected stress in pressure equipment, in addition to the traditional approach of design by formula (Part 5: "Design by Analysis requirements").

=== Division 3 - Alternative Rules for Construction of High Pressure Vessels ===
This division covers the mandatory requirements, specific prohibitions and nonmandatory guidance for materials, design, fabrication, inspection and testing, markings and reports, overpressure protection and certification of pressure vessels having an internal or external pressure which exceeds 10,000 psi (70,000 kPa).

The pressure vessel can be either fired or unfired. The pressure may be from external sources, by the application of heating from an indirect or direct source, process reaction or any combination thereof.

== Section IX – Welding, Brazing, and Fusing Qualifications ==
Section IX – Welding, Brazing, and Fusing Qualifications establishes the qualification requirements for welding, brazing, and plastic fusing procedures and for the personnel performing these joining processes. Unlike most sections of the ASME Boiler and Pressure Vessel Code (BPVC), which prescribe fabrication requirements directly or specify design, inspection, and testing for components like boilers and pressure vessels, Section IX is primarily a referencing code. Its qualification requirements are not invoked independently but are instead called upon by other ASME construction codes (such as Section VIII for pressure vessels or B31 for piping).

=== History ===
Prior to the introduction of Section IX, individual sections of the BPVC contained their own separate and varying qualification requirements for welded construction. Following the formal acceptance of welding for pressure-retaining components in the 1935 edition of the Code (where it was initially introduced as a supplement to Section VIII), a joint committee of the American Society of Mechanical Engineers (ASME) and the American Welding Society (AWS) was established to develop a unified qualification standard.

Section IX was first published as a standalone section of the BPVC in 1941, initially covering only three welding processes: Shielded Metal Arc Welding (SMAW), Oxy-Fuel Welding (OFW), and Carbon-Arc Welding (CAW). The fundamental philosophy of qualifying procedures and personnel while permitting qualified ranges of variables has remained largely unchanged since this first edition. Although additional joining processes and qualification rules have been incorporated over time to keep pace with industrial technology, the core mechanics of the code have remained highly stable.

The scope of Section IX has expanded periodically over its history. Brazing qualifications were incorporated in the 1960 edition, turning it into the "Welding and Brazing Qualifications" standard. The 2013 edition introduced qualification requirements for plastic fusing, along with a common set of general requirements applicable to all material-joining processes.

=== Core Concepts and Methodology ===
For welding, Section IX establishes requirements for qualifying Welding Procedure Specifications (WPSs) by means of Procedure Qualification Records (PQRs) and for qualifying welders and welding operators through performance qualification tests. Similar qualification systems are provided for brazing procedures and brazers, and for plastic fusing procedures and operators.

A fundamental concept of Section IX is the classification of qualification variables as essential, supplementary essential, and nonessential variables:

- Essential variables are those that may affect the mechanical properties or soundness of a joint and generally require complete requalification when changed.
- Supplementary essential variables apply when notch toughness requirements are specified by the referencing construction code.
- Nonessential variables may be changed on a shop floor without requiring requalification, provided the Welding Procedure Specification is revised accordingly.

To reduce the administrative and economic burden of procedure qualifications, Section IX groups base materials into P-Numbers and welding filler metals into F-Numbers. Qualification of a procedure using one material or filler metal may therefore extend to other materials or filler metals within the same classification, subject to the qualification rules of the Code.

=== Internal Structure ===
Since the 2013 edition, Section IX has been organized into a modular structure consisting of four principal Parts:

- Part QG – General Requirements (universal rules applicable to all joining types)
- Part QW – Welding (Articles I through V)
- Part QB – Brazing (Articles XI through XIV)
- Part QF – Plastic Fusing (Articles XXI through XXIV)

Within Part QW, Article V is unique because it permits manufacturers and contractors to use prequalified Standard Welding Procedure Specifications (SWPSs) that have been developed by the American Welding Society (AWS) and formally adopted by ASME, bypassing the typical requirement for an organization to perform its own independent Procedure Qualification Record (PQR) testing.

=== Global Significance ===
Section IX is referenced by numerous ASME construction codes, including those governing boilers, pressure vessels, and pressure piping. Because of its rigorous framework and historical reliability, it is widely used internationally as the definitive qualification standard for joining procedures and personnel in pressure equipment fabrication, even in countries that do not otherwise utilize the ASME construction codes. Within ISO-based manufacturing systems, it serves a functionally parallel purpose to the ISO 15614 series (for procedure qualification) and the ISO 9606 series (for personnel qualification).

== See also ==
- Pressure Equipment Directive
- List of welding codes
- EN 13445
- PD 5500
- Uniform Mechanical Code
- Uniform Plumbing Code
