= Pressure vessel =

Vessel for pressurised gases or liquids

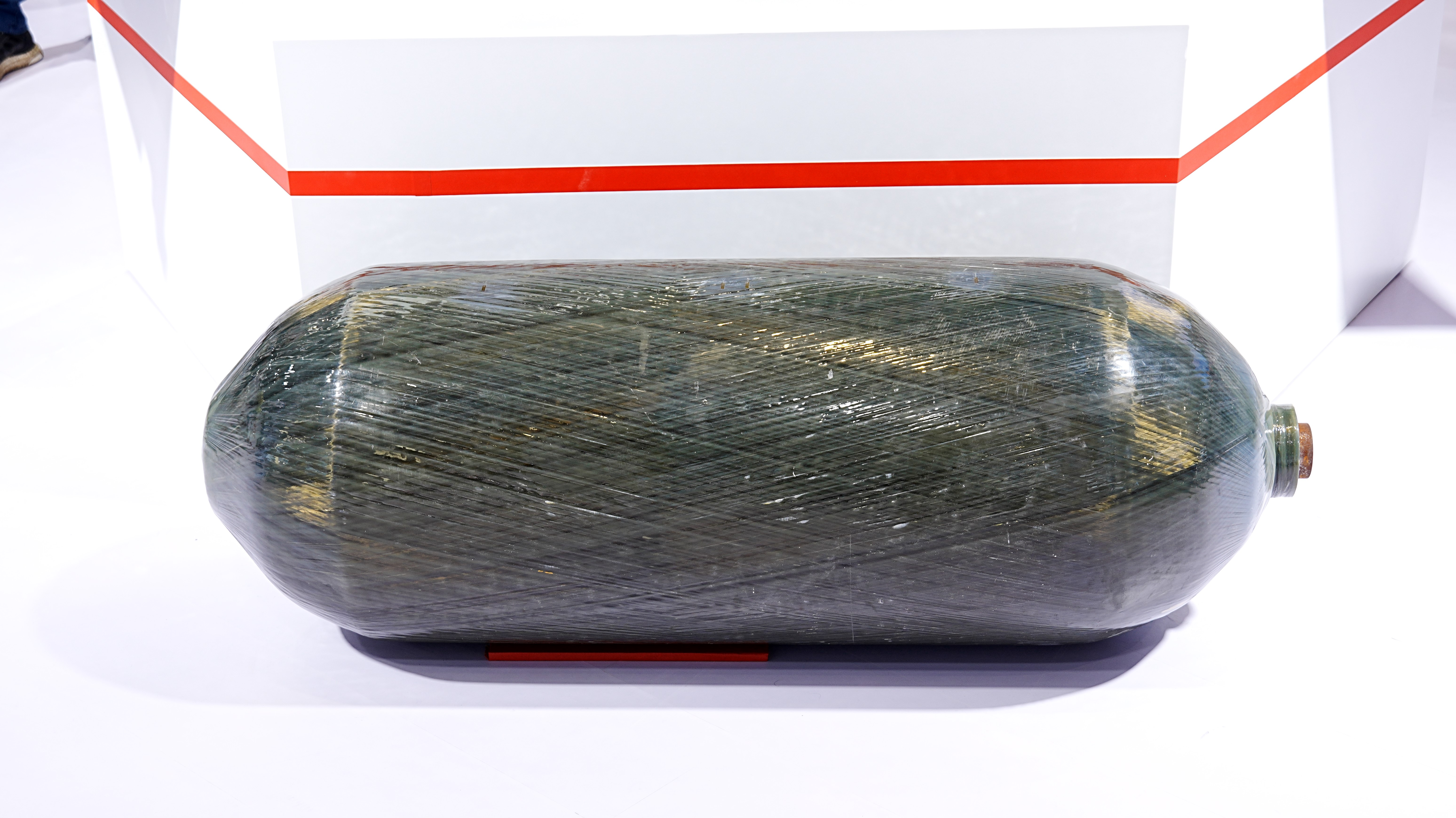
Hydrogen pressure cylinder

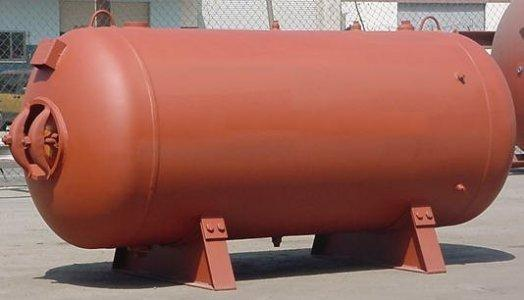
A welded steel pressure vessel constructed as a horizontal cylinder with domed ends. An access cover can be seen at one end, and a drain valve at the bottom centre.

A pressure vessel is a container designed to hold gases or liquids at a pressure substantially different from the ambient pressure.

Construction methods and materials may be chosen to suit the pressure application, and will depend on the size of the vessel, the contents, working pressure, mass constraints, and the number of items required.

Pressure vessels can be dangerous, and fatal accidents have occurred in the history of their development and operation. Consequently, pressure vessel design, manufacture, and operation are regulated by engineering authorities backed by legislation. For these reasons, the definition of a pressure vessel varies from country to country.

The design involves parameters such as maximum safe operating pressure and temperature, safety factor, corrosion allowance and minimum design temperature (for brittle fracture). Construction is tested using nondestructive testing, such as ultrasonic testing, radiography, and pressure tests. Hydrostatic pressure tests usually use water, but pneumatic tests use air or another gas. Hydrostatic testing is preferred, because it is a safer method, as much less energy is released if a fracture occurs during the test (water does not greatly increase its volume when rapid depressurisation occurs, unlike gases, which expand explosively). Mass or batch production products will often have a representative sample tested to destruction in controlled conditions for quality assurance. Pressure relief devices may be fitted if the overall safety of the system is sufficiently enhanced.

In most countries, vessels over a certain size and pressure must be built to a formal code. In the United States that code is the ASME Boiler and Pressure Vessel Code (BPVC). In Europe the code is the Pressure Equipment Directive. These vessels also require an authorised inspector to sign off on every new vessel constructed and each vessel has a nameplate with pertinent information about the vessel, such as maximum allowable working pressure, maximum temperature, minimum design metal temperature, what company manufactured it, the date, its registration number (through the National Board), and American Society of Mechanical Engineers's official stamp for pressure vessels (U-stamp). The nameplate makes the vessel traceable and officially an ASME Code vessel.

A special application is pressure vessels for human occupancy, for which more stringent safety rules apply.

== Definition and scope ==
The ASME definition of a pressure vessel is a container designed to hold gases or liquids at a pressure substantially different from the ambient pressure.

The Australian and New Zealand standard "AS/NZS 1200:2000 Pressure equipment" defines a pressure vessel as a vessel subject to internal or external pressure, including connected components and accessories up to the connection to external piping.

This article may include information on pressure vessels in the broad sense, and is not restricted to any single definition.

=== Components ===
A pressure vessel comprises a shell, and usually one or more other components needed to pressurise, retain the pressure, depressurise, and provide access for maintenance and inspection. There may be other components and equipment provided to facilitate the intended use, and some of these may be considered parts of the pressure vessel, such as shell penetrations and their closures, and viewports and airlocks on a pressure vessel for human occupancy, as they affect the integrity and strength of the shell, are also part of the structure retaining the pressure. Pressure gauges and safety devices like pressure relief valves may also be deemed part of the pressure vessel. There may also be structural components permanently attached to the vessel for lifting, moving, or mounting it, like a foot ring, skids, handles, lugs, or mounting brackets.

== Types ==
Types by function:

- Aerosol spray dispenser – Dispensing system of an aerosol mist
- Air receiver tank – pressure vessel that stores air delivered from a compressor
- Autoclave – Pressurised heating apparatus
- Boiler – Closed vessel in which fluid is heated
- Flash evaporator – Pressure vessel for facilitating evaporation of a liquid
- Gas storage cylinder – Container for storing pressurised gas
- Gas storage tube – Large volume, high pressure gas storage cylinder
- Hydraulic accumulator – Reservoir to store and stabilise fluid pressure
  - Expansion tank – Tank used in hot water systems
  - Hydrophore (system) – system used in tall buildings and marine environments to maintain water pressure.
- Pressure cooker – Device for preparing food
- Pressure tank – Tank used in a water system to maintain pressure
- Refrigeration plant – Equipment to remove heat from the cooled area, and reject it to a higher temperature area
- Pressure piping
- Pipeline – Pumping fluids or gas through pipes
- Reverse osmosis plant – Type of water purification plant
- Chemical process reactor – Enclosed volume where interconversion of compounds takes place
- Fractionating column, also known as Distillation column – Equipment to separate liquids by distillation
- Shell-and-tube heat exchanger – Class of heat exchanger designs
- Vacuum truck – Tank truck with a pump designed to load material through suction lines
- Pressure Vessel for Human Occupancy (PVHO) – Pressurised Equipment
  - Atmospheric diving suit – Articulated pressure-resistant anthropomorphic housing for an underwater diver
  - Crewed spacecraft – Spacecraft with life-support systems
  - Diving chamber – Hyperbaric pressure vessel for human occupancy used in diving operations
  - Hyperbaric chamber – Hyperbaric pressure vessel for human occupation
  - Hyperbaric stretcher – Portable pressure vessel to transport a person under pressure
  - Hypobaric chamber – Chamber for simulating high altitude
  - Pressurised aircraft – Aircraft that maintains a cabin pressure above the ambient when at high altitude
  - Submarine pressure hull – The structure that withstands the pressure load on a submarine
  - Submarine rescue chamber – Diving chamber for rescue of personnel of sunk submarines
  - Submersible pressure hull – Small watercraft able to navigate under water
- Dissolved gas storage – Method for safe storage of acetylene
- Fired pressure vessel – Pressure vessel heated by external combustion
  - Fire-tube boiler – Type of boiler
  - Water-tube boiler – Type of furnace generating steam
- Liquefied gas – Gas that has been turned into a liquid by cooling or compressing (vapour over liquid) storage
- Permanent gas – Gas which cannot be liquefied by pressure at normal temperatures storage
- Supercritical fluid – State of matter storage
- Vacuum evaporator – Vessel for low pressure evaportion of liquid
- Internal pressure vs external

Types by construction method:

- Seamless metal pressure vessel – Pressure vessel formed from a single piece of metal
- Welded pressure vessel – Container made from more than one metal part welded together
- Riveted pressure vessel
- Filament wound pressure vessel
- Composite overwrapped pressure vessel – Pressure vessel with a non-structural liner wrapped with a structural fiber composite

Types by construction material:

- Aluminium alloy pressure vessel
- Steel pressure vessel
- Titanium pressure vessel
- Composite pressure vessel

== Uses ==
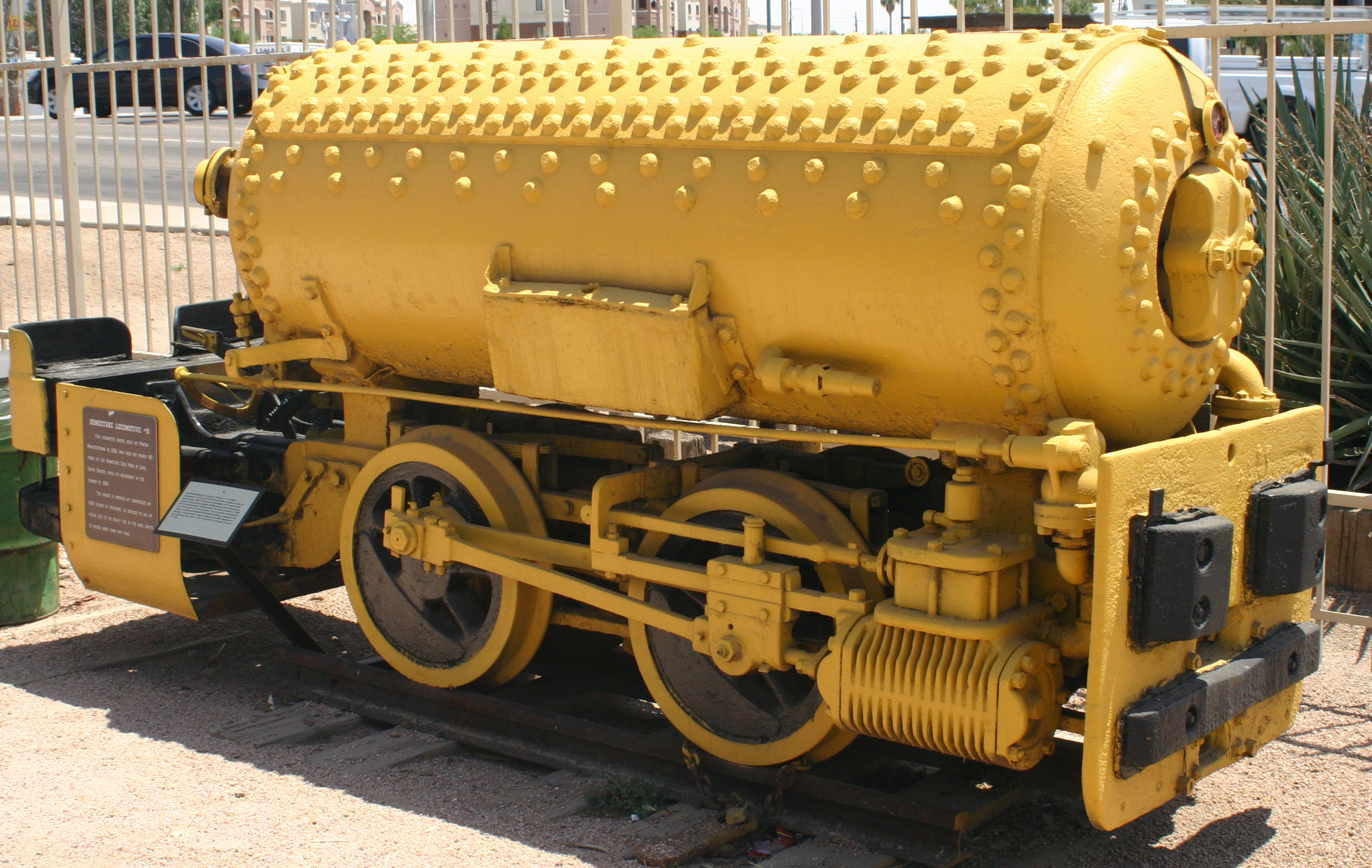
Preserved H.K. Porter, Inc. No. 3290 of 1923 powered by compressed air stored in a horizontal riveted pressure vessel

Pressure vessels are used in a variety of applications in both industry and the private sector. They appear in these sectors as industrial compressed air receivers, boilers and domestic hot water storage tanks. Other examples of pressure vessels are diving cylinders, recompression chambers, distillation towers, pressure reactors, autoclaves, and many other vessels in mining operations, oil refineries and petrochemical plants, nuclear reactor vessels, submarine and space ship habitats, atmospheric diving suits, pneumatic reservoirs, hydraulic reservoirs under pressure, rail vehicle air brake reservoirs, road vehicle air brake reservoirs, and storage vessels for high pressure permanent gases and liquified gases such as ammonia, chlorine, and LPG (propane, butane).

A pressure vessel may also support structural loads. The passenger cabin of an airliner's outer skin carries both the structural and maneuvering loads of the aircraft, and the cabin pressurization loads. The pressure hull of a submarine also carries the hull structural and maneuvering loads.

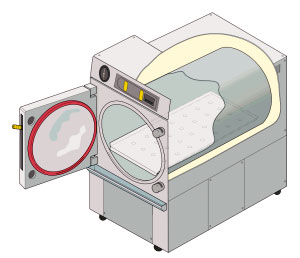
Cylindrical research autoclave illustration

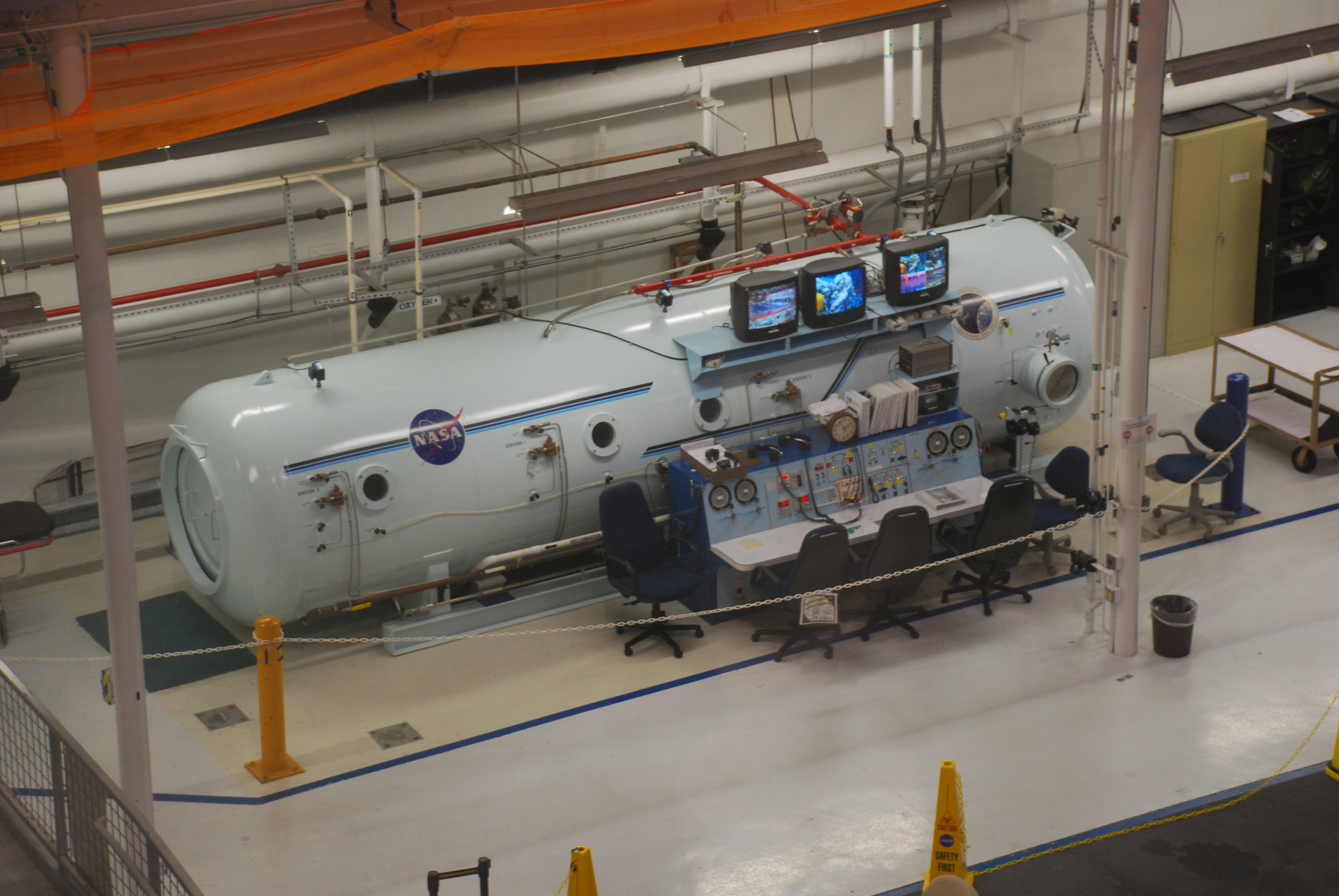
NASA decompression chamber

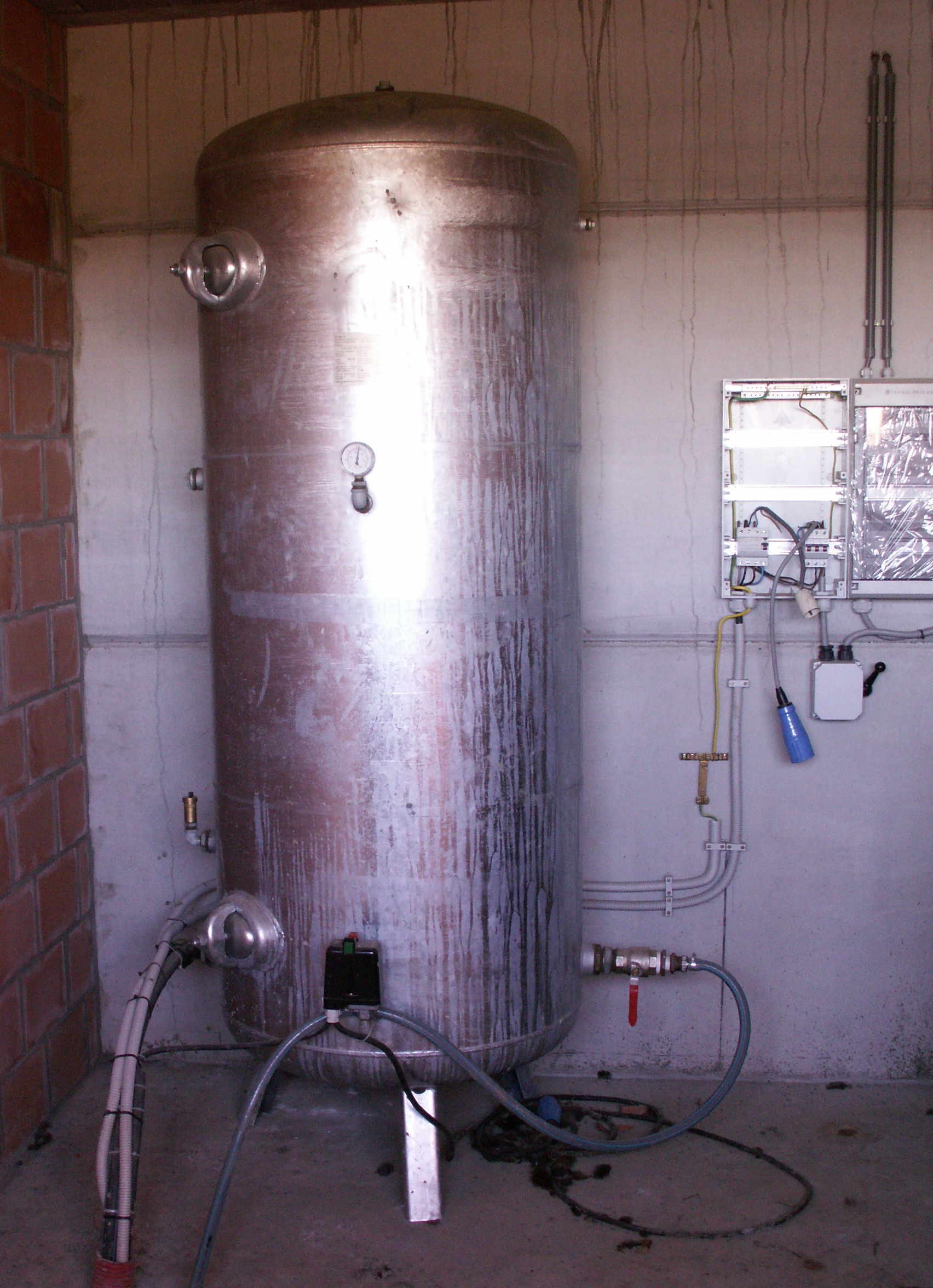
A pressure tank connected to a water well and domestic hot water system.

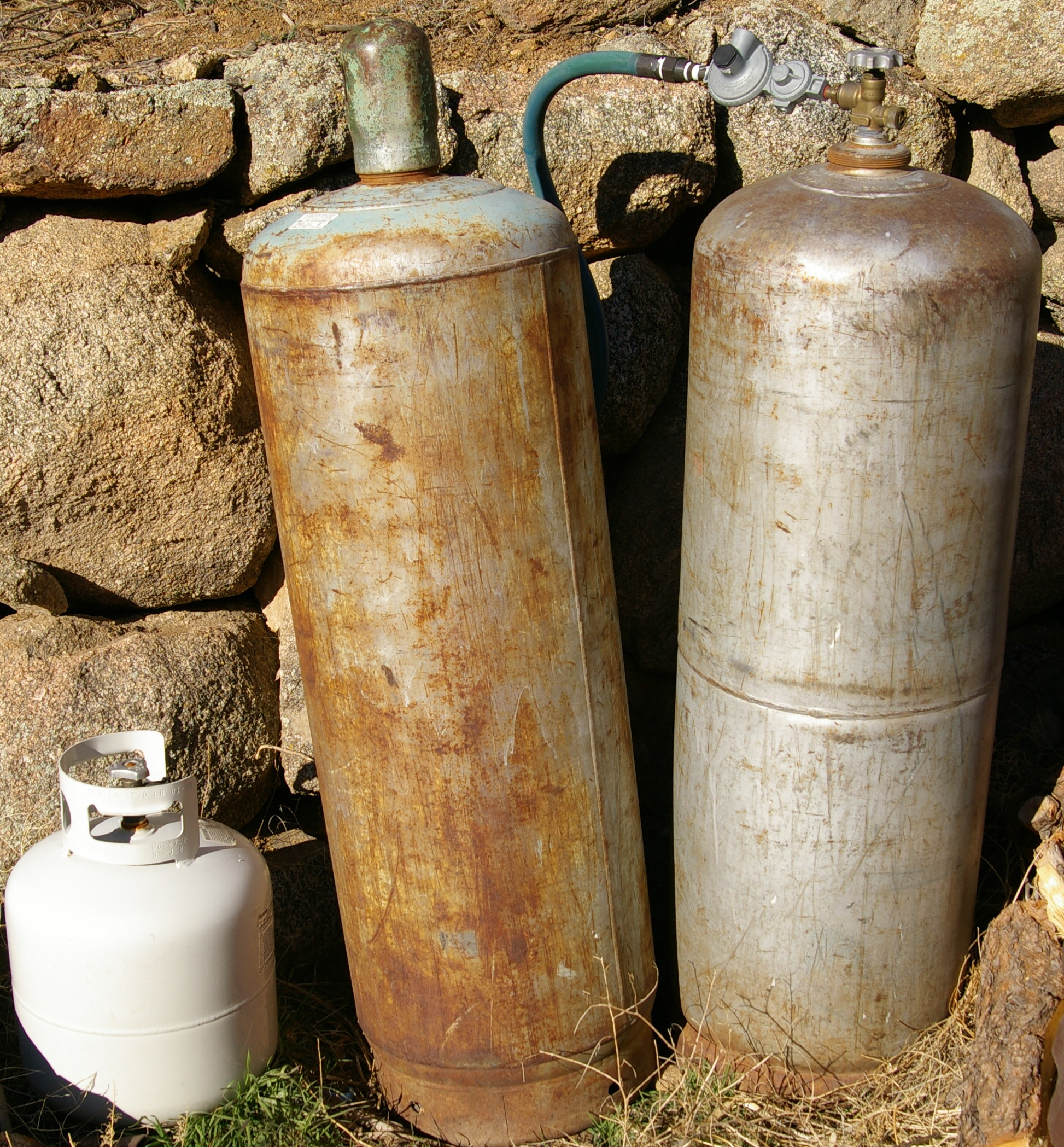
A few pressure tanks, here used to hold propane.

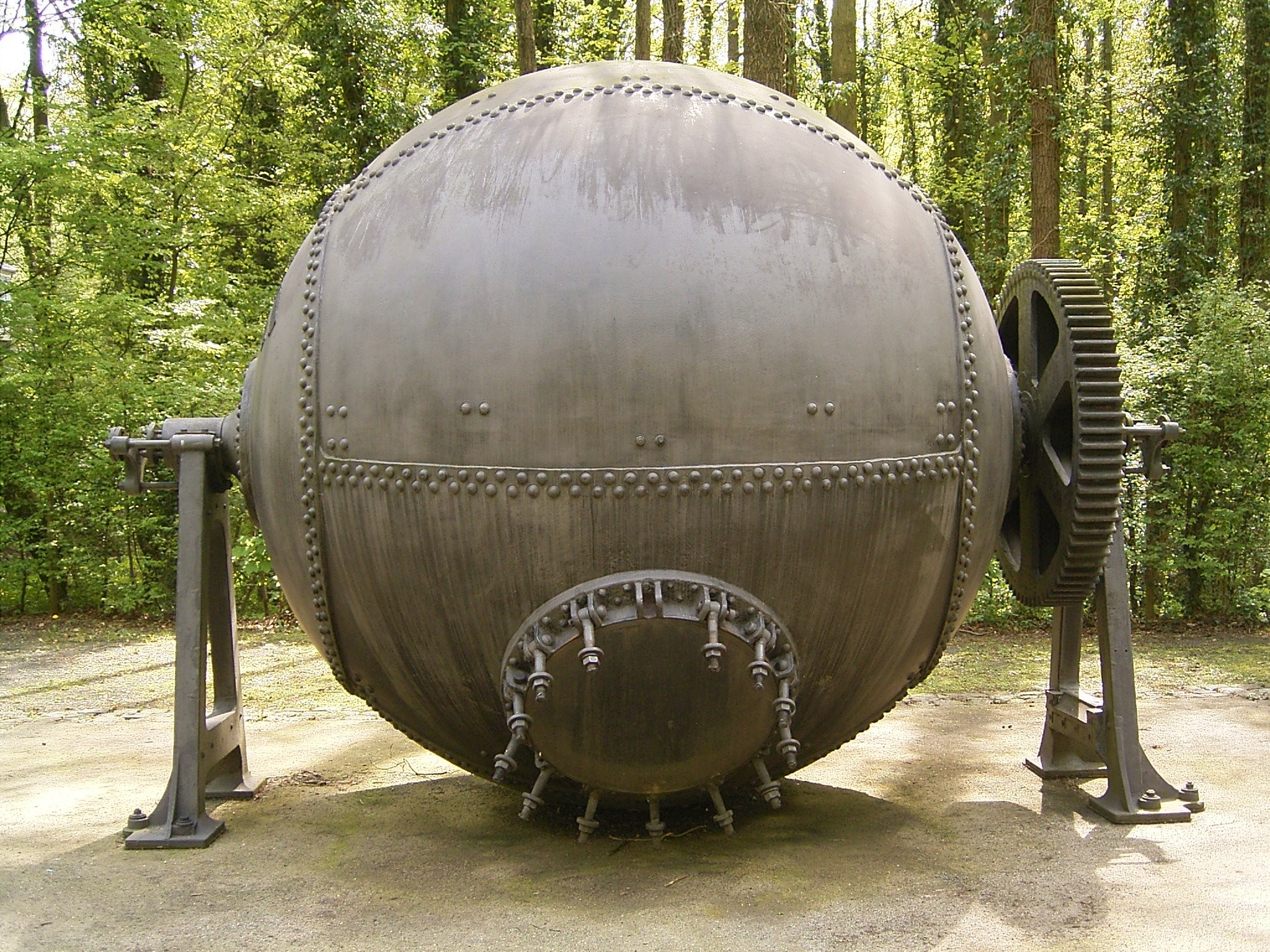
A pressure vessel used as a kier.

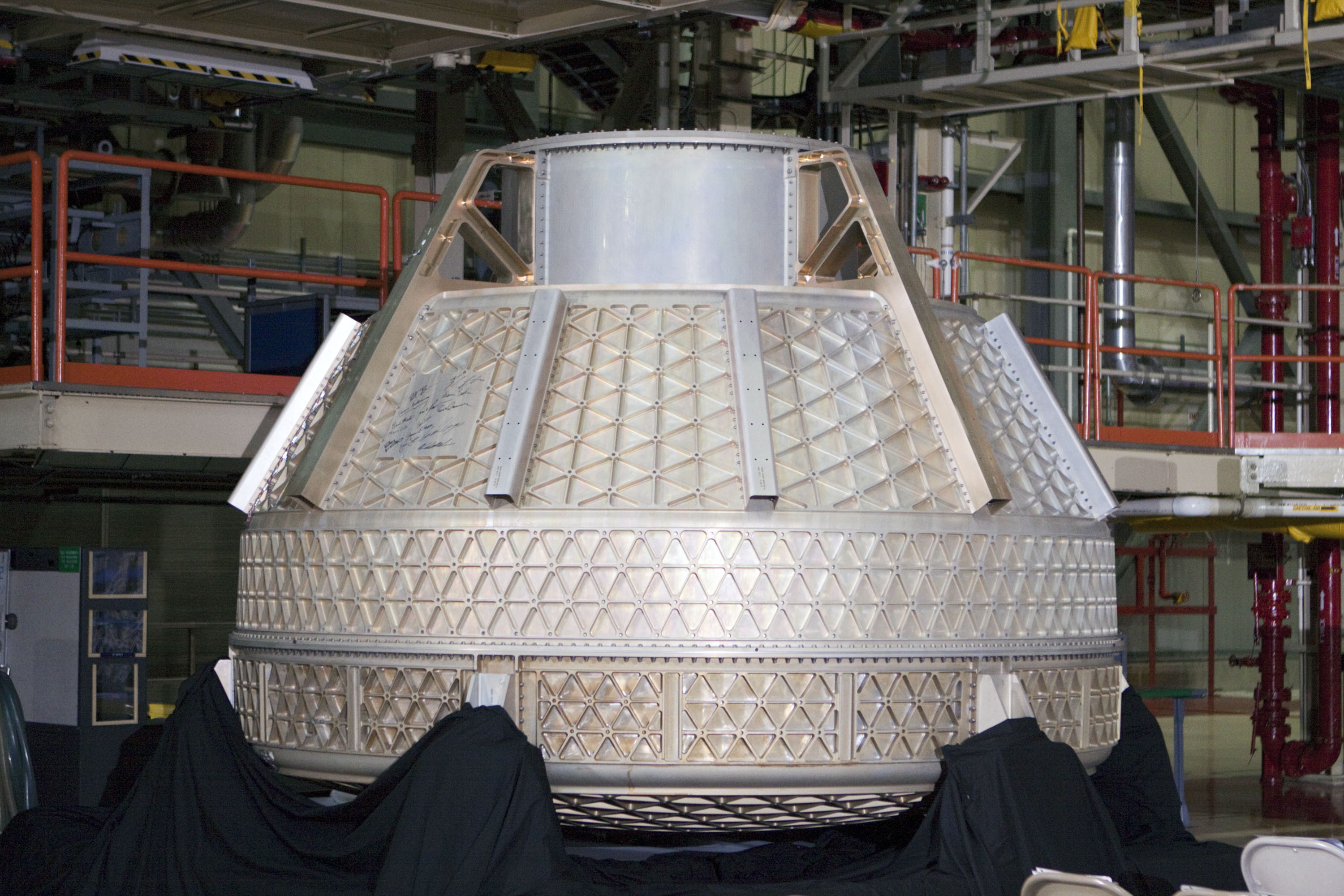
A pressure vessel used for The Boeing Company's CST-100 spacecraft.

== Design ==
=== Working pressure ===
The working pressure, i.e. the pressure difference between the interior of the pressure vessel and the surroundings when in operation, is the primary characteristic considered for design and construction. The concepts of high pressure and low pressure are somewhat flexible, and may be defined differently depending on context. There is also the matter of whether the internal pressure is greater or less than the external pressure, and its magnitude relative to normal atmospheric pressure. A vessel with internal pressure lower than atmospheric may also be called a hypobaric vessel or a vacuum vessel. A pressure vessel with high internal pressure can easily be made to be structurally stable, and will usually fail in tension, but failure due to excessive external pressure is usually by buckling instability and collapse.

=== Shape ===
Pressure vessels can theoretically be almost any shape, but shapes made of sections of spheres, cylinders, ellipsoids of revolution, and cones with circular sections are usually employed, though some other surfaces of revolution are also inherently stable. A common design is a cylinder with end caps called heads. Head shapes are frequently hemispherical, ellipsoidal, or dished (torispherical). More complicated shapes have historically been much harder to analyze for safe operation and are usually far more difficult to construct.

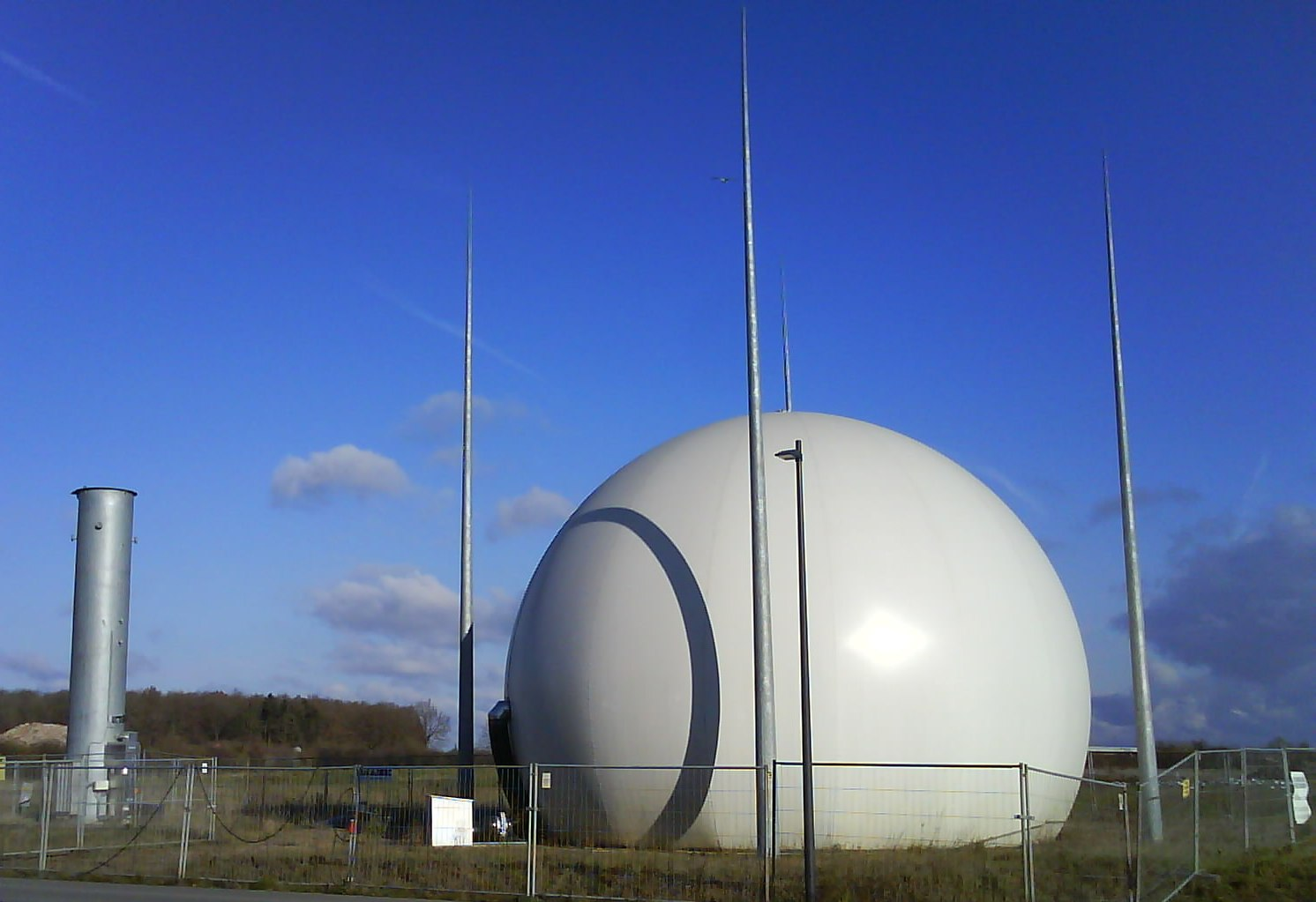
Spherical gas container.

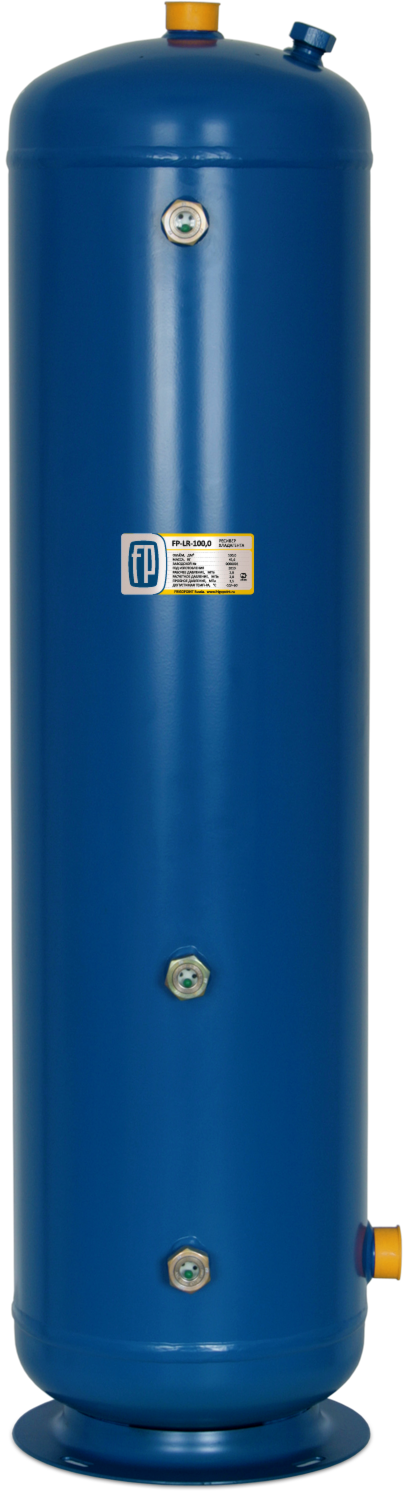
Cylindrical pressure vessel.

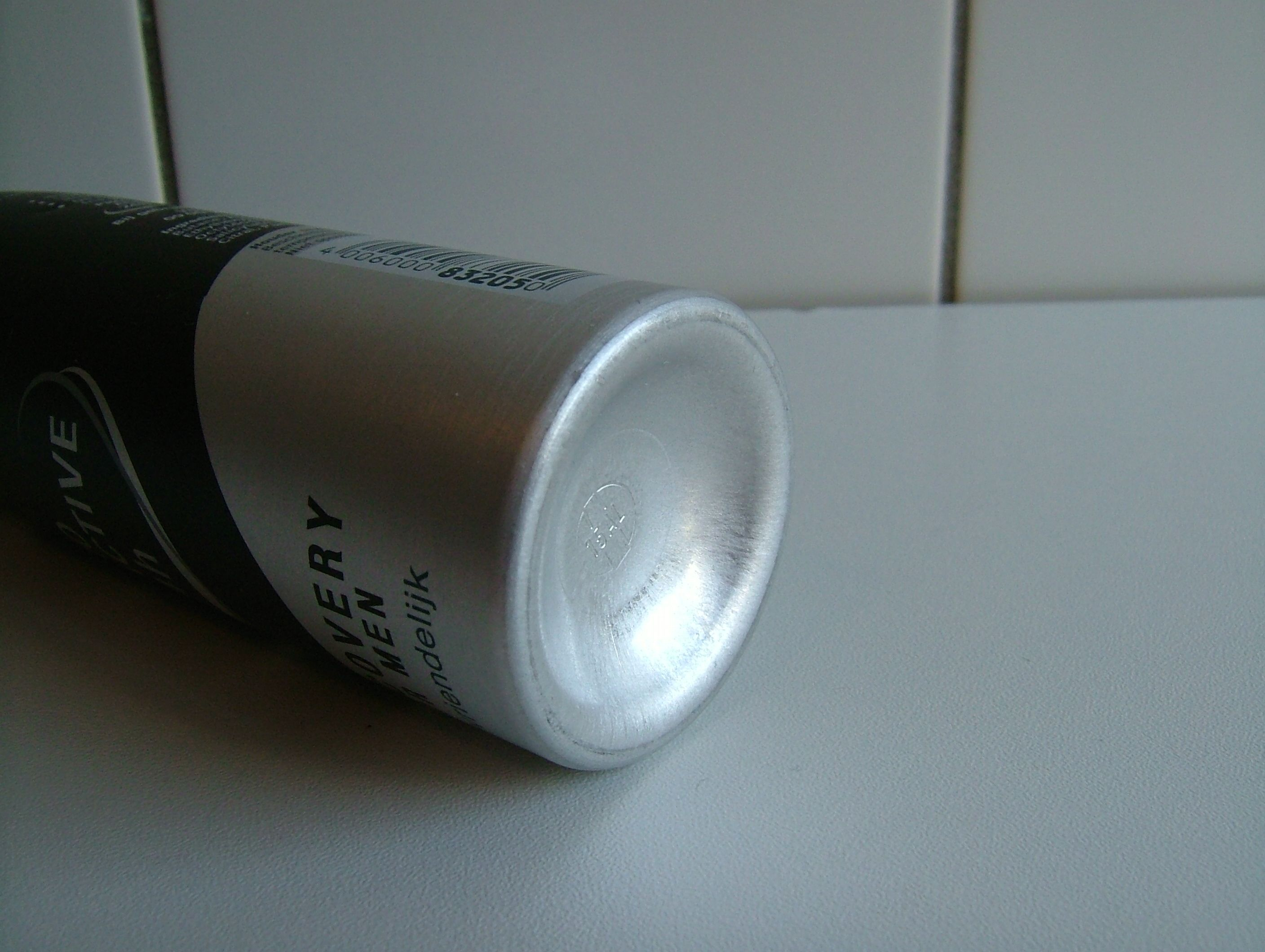
Picture of the bottom of an aerosol spray can.

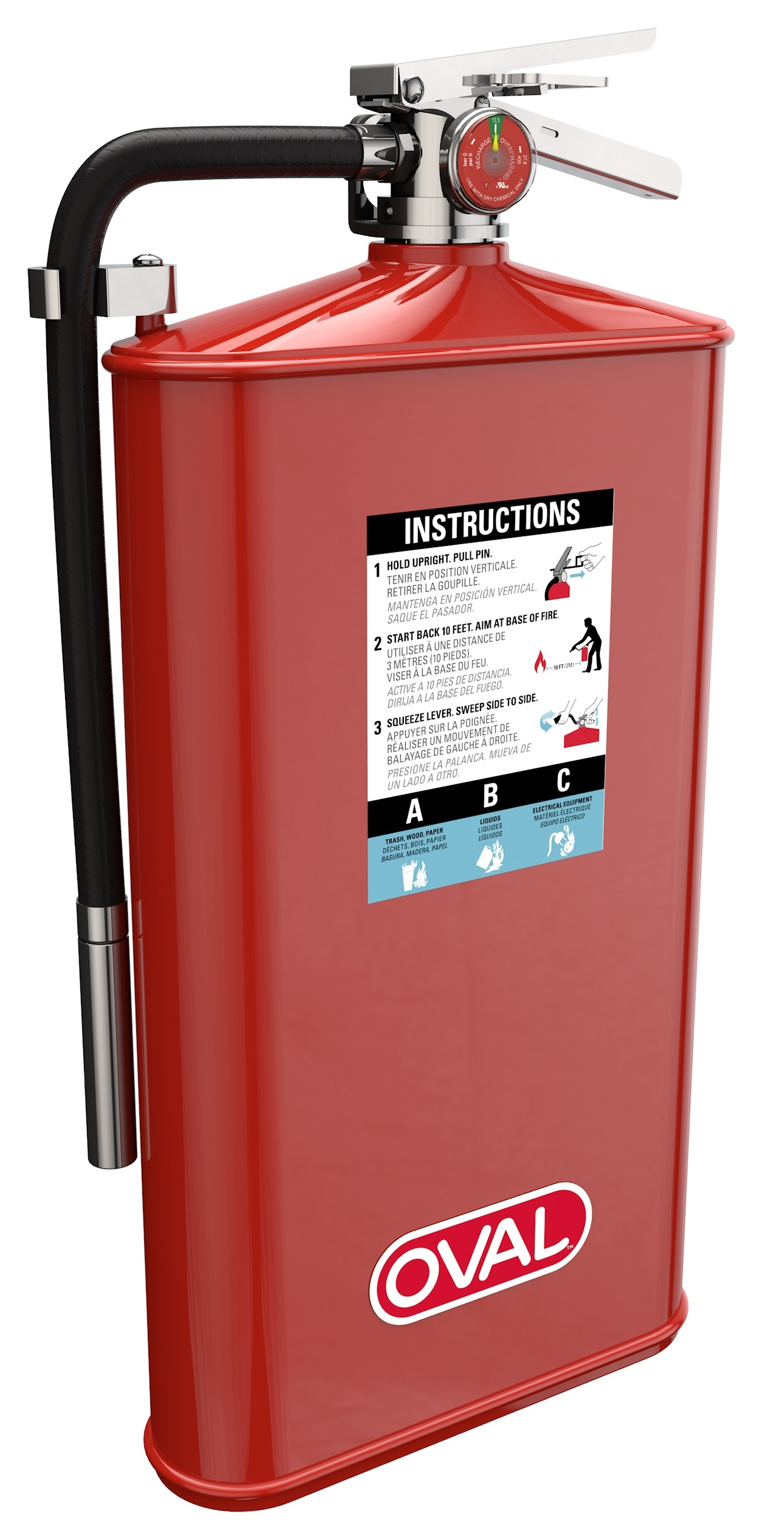
Fire Extinguisher with rounded rectangle pressure vessel

Theoretically, a spherical pressure vessel has approximately twice the strength of a cylindrical pressure vessel with the same wall thickness, and is the ideal shape to hold internal pressure. However, a spherical shape is difficult to manufacture, and therefore more expensive, so most pressure vessels are cylindrical with 2:1 semi-elliptical heads or end caps on each end. Smaller pressure vessels are assembled from a pipe and two covers. For cylindrical vessels with a diameter up to 600 mm (NPS of 24 in), it is possible to use seamless pipe for the shell, thus avoiding many inspection and testing issues, mainly the nondestructive examination of radiography for the long seam if required. A disadvantage of these vessels is that greater diameters are more expensive, so that for example the most economic shape of a 1,000 litres (35 ft^{3}), 250 bars (3,600 psi) pressure vessel might be a diameter of 91.44 centimetres (36 in) and a length of 1.7018 metres (67 in) including the 2:1 semi-elliptical domed end caps.

=== Scaling ===
No matter what shape it takes, the minimum mass of a pressure vessel scales with the pressure and volume it contains and is inversely proportional to the strength to weight ratio of the construction material (minimum mass decreases as strength increases).

==== Scaling of stress in walls of vessel ====
Pressure vessels are held together against the gas pressure due to tensile forces within the walls of the container. The normal (tensile) stress in the walls of the container is proportional to the pressure and radius of the vessel and inversely proportional to the thickness of the walls. Therefore, pressure vessels are designed to have a thickness proportional to the radius of tank and the pressure of the tank and inversely proportional to the maximum allowed normal stress of the particular material used in the walls of the container.

Because (for a given pressure) the thickness of the walls scales with the radius of the tank, the mass of a tank (which scales as the length times radius times thickness of the wall for a cylindrical tank) scales with the volume of the gas held (which scales as length times radius squared). The exact formula varies with the tank shape but depends on the density, ρ, and maximum allowable stress σ of the material in addition to the pressure P and volume V of the vessel. (See below for the exact equations for the stress in the walls.)

==== Spherical vessel ====
For a sphere, the minimum mass of a pressure vessel is

$$M = {3 \over 2} P V {\rho \over \sigma}$$,

where:

- $M$ is mass, (kg)
- $P$ is the pressure difference from ambient (the gauge pressure), (Pa)
- $V$ is volume, (m^{3})
- $\rho$ is the density of the pressure vessel material, (kg/m^{3})
- $\sigma$ is the maximum working stress that material can tolerate. (Pa)

Other shapes besides a sphere have constants larger than 3/2 (infinite cylinders take 2), although some tanks, such as non-spherical wound composite tanks can approach this.

==== Cylindrical vessel with hemispherical ends ====
This is sometimes called a "bullet" for its shape, although in geometric terms it is a capsule.

For a cylinder with hemispherical ends,

$$M = 2 \pi R^2 (R + W) P {\rho \over \sigma}$$,

where

- R is the Radius (m)
- W is the middle cylinder width only, and the overall width is W + 2R (m)

==== Cylindrical vessel with semi-elliptical ends ====
In a vessel with an aspect ratio of middle cylinder width to radius of 2:1,

$$M = 6 \pi R^3 P {\rho \over \sigma}$$.

==== Gas storage capacity ====
In looking at the first equation, the factor PV, in SI units, is in units of (pressurization) energy. For a stored gas, PV is proportional to the mass of gas at a given temperature, thus

$M = {3 \over 2} nRT {\rho \over \sigma}$. (see gas law)

The other factors are constant for a given vessel shape and material. So we can see that there is no theoretical "efficiency of scale", in terms of the ratio of pressure vessel mass to pressurization energy, or of pressure vessel mass to stored gas mass. For storing gases, "tankage efficiency" is independent of pressure, at least for the same temperature.

So, for example, a typical design for a minimum mass tank to hold helium (as a pressurant gas) on a rocket would use a spherical chamber for a minimum shape constant, carbon fiber for best possible $\rho / \sigma$, and very cold helium for best possible $M / {pV}$.

=== Stress in thin-walled pressure vessels ===
Stress in a thin-walled pressure vessel in the shape of a sphere is

$$\sigma_\theta = \sigma_{\rm long} = \frac{pr}{2t}$$,

where $\sigma_\theta$ is hoop stress, or stress in the circumferential direction, $\sigma_{long}$ is stress in the longitudinal direction, p is internal gauge pressure, r is the inner radius of the sphere, and t is thickness of the sphere wall. A vessel can be considered "thin-walled" if the diameter is at least 10 times (sometimes cited as 20 times) greater than the wall thickness.

Stress in the cylinder body of a pressure vessel.

Stress in a thin-walled pressure vessel in the shape of a cylinder is

$$\sigma_\theta = \frac{pr}{t}$$,
$$\sigma_{\rm long} = \frac{pr}{2t}$$,

where:

- $\sigma_\theta$ is hoop stress, or stress in the circumferential direction
- $\sigma_{long}$ is stress in the longitudinal direction
- p is internal gauge pressure
- r is the inner radius of the cylinder
- t is thickness of the cylinder wall.

Almost all pressure vessel design standards contain variations of these two formulas with additional empirical terms to account for variation of stresses across thickness, quality control of welds and in-service corrosion allowances. All formulae mentioned above assume uniform distribution of membrane stresses across thickness of shell but in reality, that is not the case. Deeper analysis is given by Lamé's theorem, which gives the distribution of stress in the walls of a thick-walled cylinder of a homogeneous and isotropic material. The formulae of pressure vessel design standards are extension of Lamé's theorem by putting some limit on ratio of inner radius and thickness.

For example, the ASME Boiler and Pressure Vessel Code (BPVC) (UG-27) formulas are:

Spherical shells: Thickness has to be less than 0.356 times inner radius

$$\sigma_\theta = \sigma_{\rm long} = \frac{p(r + 0.2t)}{2tE}$$

Cylindrical shells: Thickness has to be less than 0.5 times inner radius

$$\sigma_\theta = \frac{p(r + 0.6t)}{tE}$$
$$\sigma_{\rm long} = \frac{p(r - 0.4t)}{2tE}$$

where E is the joint efficiency, and all others variables as stated above.

The factor of safety is often included in these formulas as well, in the case of the ASME BPVC this term is included in the material stress value when solving for pressure or thickness.

=== Shell penetrations ===
Also sometimes called hull penetrations, depending on context, shell penetrations are intentional breaks in the structural integrity of the shell, and are usually significant local stress-raisers, so they must be accounted for in the design so they do not become failure points. It is usually necessary to reinforce the shell in the immediate vicinity of such penetrations. Shell penetrations are necessary to provide a variety of functions, including passage of the contents from the outside to the inside and back out, and in special applications for transmission of electricity, light, and other services through the shell. The simplest case is gas cylinders, which need only a neck penetration threaded to fit a valve, while a submarine or spacecraft may have a large number of penetrations for a large number of functions.

==== Penetration thread ====
The screw thread used for high pressure vessel shell penetrations is subject to high loads and must not leak. High pressure cylinders are produced with conical (tapered) threads and parallel threads. Two sizes of tapered threads have dominated the full metal cylinders in industrial use from 0.2 to 50 litres (0.0071 to 1.7657 ft^{3}) in volume.

For smaller fittings, taper thread standard 17E is used, with a 12% taper right hand thread, standard Whitworth 55° form with a pitch of 14 threads per inch (5.5 threads per cm) and pitch diameter at the top thread of the cylinder of 18.036 millimetres (0.71 in). These connections are sealed using thread tape and torqued to between 120 and 150 newton-metres (89 and 111 lbf⋅ft) on steel cylinders, and between 75 and 140 N⋅m (55 and 103 lbf⋅ft) on aluminium cylinders.

For larger fittings, taper thread standard 25E is used. To screw in the valve, a higher torque of typically about 200 N⋅m (150 lbf⋅ft) is necessary, Until around 1950, hemp was used as a sealant. Later, a thin sheet of lead pressed to a hat form which closely fitted the external threads, with a hole on top was used. The fitter would squeeze the soft lead shim to conform better with the grooves and ridges of the fitting before screwing it into the hole. The lead would deform to form a thin layer between the internal and external thread, and thereby fill the gaps to create the seal. Since 2005, PTFE-tape has been used to avoid using lead.

A tapered thread provides simple assembly, but requires high torque for connecting and leads to high radial forces in the vessel neck, and has a limited number of times it can be used before it is excessively deformed. This could be extended a bit by always returning the same fitting to the same hole, and avoiding over-tightening.

All cylinders built for 300 bar (4,400 psi) working pressure, all diving cylinders, and all composite cylinders use parallel threads.

Parallel threads for cylinder necks and similar penetrations of pressure vessels are made to several standards:

- M25x2 ISO parallel thread, which is sealed by an O-ring and torqued to 100 to 130 N⋅m (74 to 96 lbf⋅ft) on steel, and 95 to 130 N⋅m (70 to 96 lbf⋅ft) on aluminium cylinders;
- M18x1.5 parallel thread, which is sealed by an O-ring, and torqued to 100 to 130 N⋅m (74 to 96 lbf⋅ft) on steel cylinders, and 85 to 100 N⋅m (63 to 74 lbf⋅ft) on aluminium cylinders;
- 3/4"x14 BSP parallel thread, which has a 55° Whitworth thread form, a pitch diameter of 25.279 millimetres (0.9952 in) and a pitch of 14 threads per inch (1.814 mm);
- 3/4"x14 NGS (NPSM) parallel thread, sealed by an O-ring, torqued to 40 to 50 N⋅m (30 to 37 lbf⋅ft) on aluminium cylinders, which has a 60° thread form, a pitch diameter of 0.9820 to 0.9873 in (24.94 to 25.08 mm), and a pitch of 14 threads per inch (5.5 threads per cm);
- 3/4"x16 UNF, sealed by an O-ring, torqued to 40 to 50 N⋅m (30 to 37 lbf⋅ft) on aluminium cylinders.
- 7/8"x14 UNF, sealed by an O-ring.

The 3/4"NGS and 3/4"BSP are very similar, having the same pitch and a pitch diameter that only differs by about 0.2 mm (0.008 in), but they are not compatible, as the thread forms are different.

All parallel thread valves are sealed using an elastomer O-ring at top of the neck thread which seals in a chamfer or step in the cylinder neck and against the flange of the valve.

==== Pressure vessel closures ====
Pressure vessel closures are pressure retaining structures designed to provide quick access to pipelines, pressure vessels, pig traps, filters and filtration systems. Typically pressure vessel closures allow access by maintenance personnel.

A commonly used maintenance access hole shape is elliptical, which allows the closure to be passed through the opening, and rotated into the working position, and is held in place by a bar on the outside, secured by a central bolt. The internal pressure prevents it from being inadvertently opened under load.

Placing the closure on the high pressure side of the opening uses the pressure difference to lock the closure when at service pressure. Where this is impracticable a safety interlock may be mandated.

An airlock (Note: "Airlock" is sometimes written as air-lock or air lock, or abbreviated to just lock.) is a room or compartment which permits passage between environments of differing atmospheric pressure or composition, while minimizing the changing of pressure or composition between the differing environments. It consists of a chamber with two airtight doors or hatches arranged in series, which are not opened simultaneously. Airlocks can be small or large enough for one or more people to pass through, which may take the form of an antechamber.

An airlock may also be used underwater to allow passage between the air environment in a pressure vessel, such as a submarine or diving bell, and the water environment outside. In such cases the airlock can contain air or water. This is called a floodable airlock or underwater airlock, and is used to prevent water from entering a submersible vessel or underwater habitat. A similar arrangement is used on spacecraft to facilitate extravehicular activity.

=== Construction materials ===
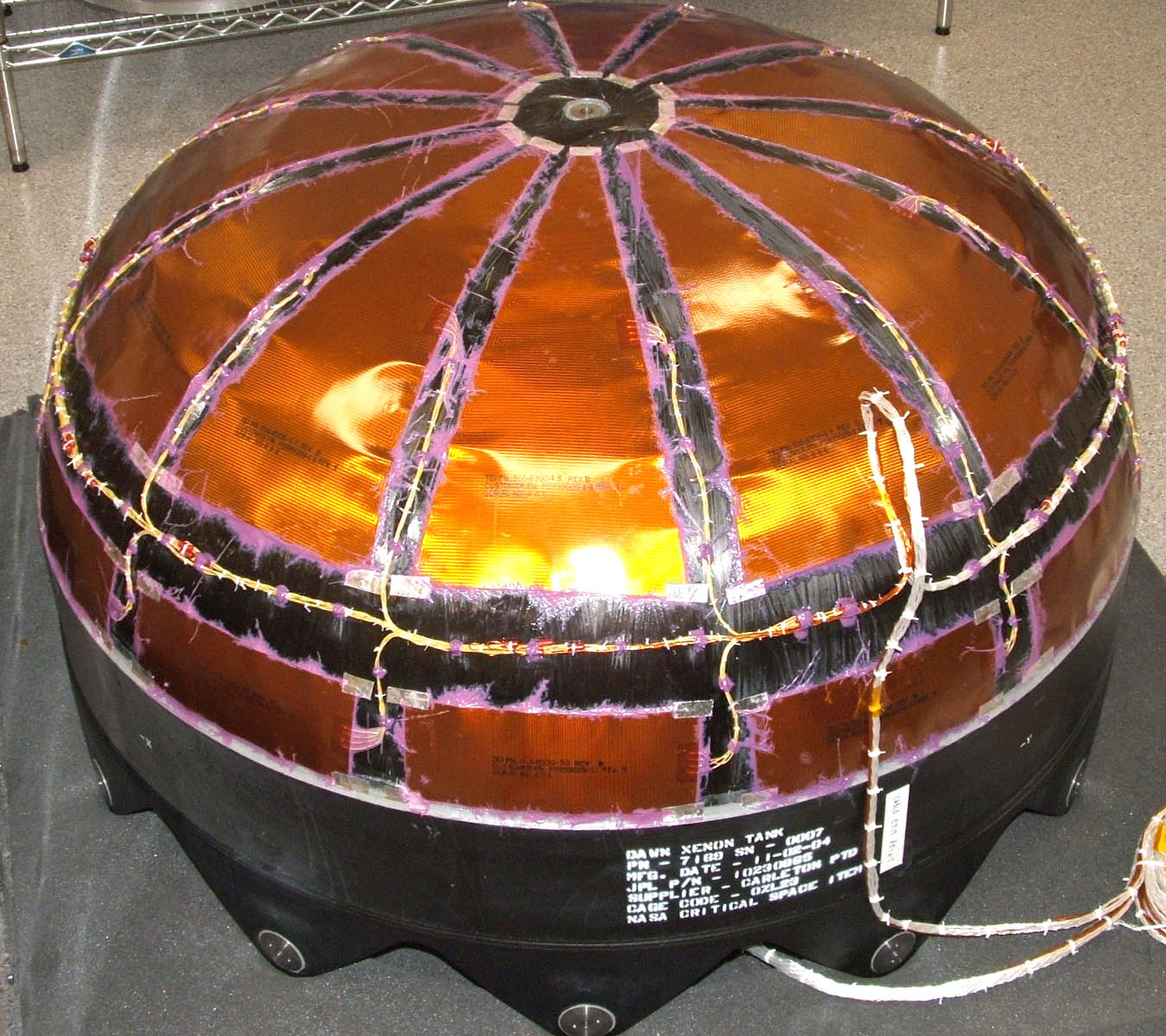
Composite overwrapped pressure vessel with titanium liner.

The choice of material for a pressure vessel depends on a number of factors, including pressure rating, service temperature, contents, weight constraints, working environment, materials and processing cost and availability, external loads, required working lifespan, and feasibility, ease and cost of revalidation, maintenance, and inspection. In some cases it is a matter of choosing from a variety of off the shelf options, and in others a comprehensive analysis and design process may be necessary

Many pressure vessels are made of steel, and a variety of steel alloys may be used. The choice depends on strength, weight, corrosion resistance, cold working performance, ductility, weldability, cost, and availability. To manufacture a cylindrical or spherical pressure vessel, rolled and possibly forged parts would have to be welded together. Some mechanical properties of steel, achieved by rolling or forging, could be adversely affected by welding, unless special precautions are taken. In addition to adequate mechanical strength, current standards dictate the use of steel with a high impact resistance, especially for vessels used in low temperatures. In applications where carbon steel would suffer corrosion, special corrosion resistant material should also be used.

Aluminium is commonly used for seamless gas cylinders.

Titanium has been used in deep submersible pressure hulls, like DSV Limiting Factor

Some pressure vessels are made of composite materials, such as filament wound composite using carbon fibre held in place with a polymer. Due to the very high tensile strength of carbon fibre these vessels can be very light, but are much more difficult to manufacture. The composite material may be wound around a metal liner, forming a composite overwrapped pressure vessel.

Other very common materials include polymers such as PET in carbonated beverage containers and copper in plumbing.

Pressure vessels may be lined with various metals, ceramics, or polymers to prevent leaking and protect the structure of the vessel from the contained medium. This liner may also carry a significant portion of the pressure load.

Pressure vessels may also be constructed from concrete (PCV) or other materials which are weak in tension. Cabling, wrapped around the vessel or within the wall or the vessel itself, provides the necessary tension to resist the internal pressure. A "leakproof steel thin membrane" lines the internal wall of the vessel. Such vessels can be assembled from modular pieces and so have "no inherent size limitations". There is also a high order of redundancy thanks to the large number of individual cables resisting the internal pressure.

The very small vessels used to make liquid butane fueled cigarette lighters are subjected to about 2 bar pressure, depending on ambient temperature. These vessels are often oval (1 x 2 cm ... 1.3 x 2.5 cm) in cross section but sometimes circular. The oval versions generally include one or two internal tension struts which appear to be baffles but which also provide additional cylinder strength. This geometry is relatively inefficient for supporting pressure loads.

==== Mass of a pressure vessel ====
For many pressure vessels, such as pressure hulls of submarines and deep submergence vessels, pressurised aircraft and spacecraft, and gas cylinders for self contained breathing apparatus, mass is a critical design constraint. For an isotropic material, the necessary mass of a pressure vessel of a given size, shape and pressure rating for internal pressure will depend on the specific strength of the material at the working temperature. This may be affected by allowances for corrosion wastage and other damage and wear over the working life, other expected load conditions, and material characteristics under sustained load, variable temperature exposure, and fatigue loading conditions. For external pressure, buckling instability may be the critical load condition, and material stiffness and specific modulus will be critical material characteristics. Buckling is a major failure mode in submarine and submersible hulls. Modulus may also be a limiting factor where the geometry induces bending loads. For some materials and designs notch sensitivity may be an important factor.

===== Anisotropic materials =====
An advantage of composite materials for pressure vessel construction is the ability to align fibres in the directions where they will most efficiently support the loads, allowing less material to be used.

== Manufacturing processes ==
=== Riveted ===
Riveting was the standard method of construction for boilers, compressed air receivers and other pressure vessels of iron or steel before gas and electrical welding of reliable quality became widespread. Sheets or plates which had been rolled and forged into shape, were then riveted together, often using butt straps along the joints, and caulked along the riveted seams by deforming the edges of the overlap with a blunt chisel to create a continuous line of high contact pressure along the joint. Hot riveting caused the rivets to contract on cooling, forming a tighter joint. When rivets are installed hot they contract as they cool and generate a preload that compresses the butt straps and the shell together. The rivets deform plastically during cooling and preload stresses stabilise at approximately yield point.

Although riveting is no longer used to construct new pressure vessels, there are still riveted vessels in service, and it has been possible to re-validate some of them by finite element analysis, which can show that the service stress levels are still acceptable.

=== Welded ===
Large and low pressure vessels are commonly manufactured from formed plates welded together. Weld quality is critical to safety in pressure vessels for human occupancy.

Quality assurance of welds is important for safety, and may range from sample testing from a batch to full x-ray inspection of all welds. Non-destructive test methods may include radiographic or ultrasonic testing for internal flaws:

Quality assurance includes welder qualification (coded welder) for manual welds, welding procedure specification, material specifications, and inspection and testing of the finished welds. Welds are first inspected visually, which can quickly identify many flaws like undercuts, overlaps and uneven surface height. Once the welds have passed visual inspection, they must also pass NDT tests appropriate for the specific pressure vessel, such as ultrasonic or x-ray inspection. Equipment to rotate the pressure vessel may be used to facilitate inspection, or it may be done by automated equipment. Radiographic testing can detect voids, internal cracks, porosity, slag inclusions, variations in material thickness, incomplete fusion or incomplete penetration, and other welding defects. Items which are mass produced may also undergo destructive mechanical tests of a representative sample of welds from each batch of products.

Magnetic particle inspection can identify some flaws in ferromagnetic materials, dye penetrant inspection can be useful to detect some types of surface flaws.

Hydrostatic testing may be required for all products for high pressure applications.

Welding processes in general use for pressure vessel construction

- Shielded metal arc welding (SMAW) – Manual arc welding process
- Flux-cored arc welding (FCAW) – Semi-automatic or automatic arc welding process
- Gas metal arc welding (GMAW) – Industrial welding process
- Gas tungsten arc welding (GTAW) – Welding process
- Submerged arc welding (SAW) – Joining metals using electricity, beneath a granulated flux material

Orbital welding is frequently used to maintain a consistently high quality of weld with the GTAW process for applications where clean strong welds are essential.

=== Seamless ===
The typical circular-cylindrical high pressure gas cylinders for permanent gases (that do not liquify at storing pressure, like air, oxygen, nitrogen, hydrogen, argon, helium) have been manufactured by hot forging by pressing and rolling to get a seamless vessel of consistent material characteristics and minimised stress concentrations.

Working pressure of cylinders for use in industry, skilled craft, diving and medicine had a standardized working pressure (WP) of about 150 bars (2,200 psi) in Europe until about 1950. From about 1975, the standard pressure rose to about 200 bars (2,900 psi). Firemen need slim, lightweight cylinders to move in confined spaces; since about 1995 cylinders for 300 bars (4,400 psi) WP were used (first in pure steel).

A demand for reduced weight led to different generations of composite (fiber and matrix, over a liner) cylinders that are more vulnerable to impact damage. Composite cylinders for breathing gas are usually built for working pressure of 300 bars (4,400 psi).

Manufacturing methods for seamless metal pressure vessels are commonly used for relatively small diameter cylinders where large numbers will be produced, as the machinery and tooling require large capital outlay. The methods are well suited to high pressure gas transport and storage applications, and provide consistently high quality products.

==== Backward extrusion ====
Backward extrusion is a process by which the material is forced to flow back along the mandrel between the mandrel and die.

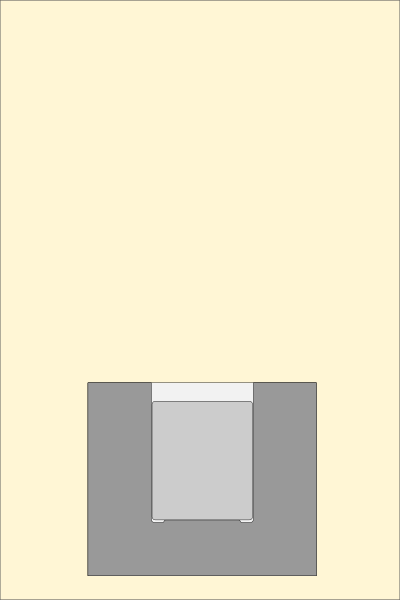
Section of die with billet inserted

Backward extrusion process, showing the material flowing out of the die back along the mandrel

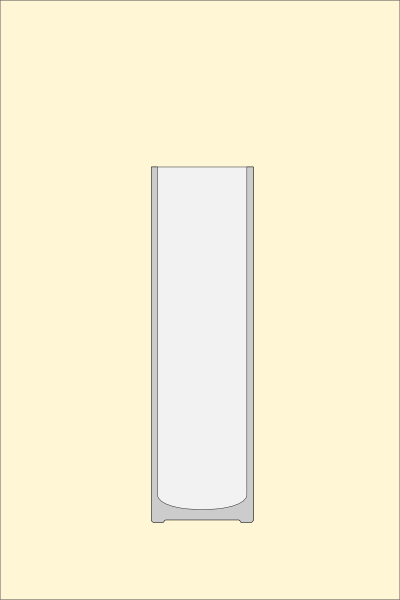
Extrusion product before trimming

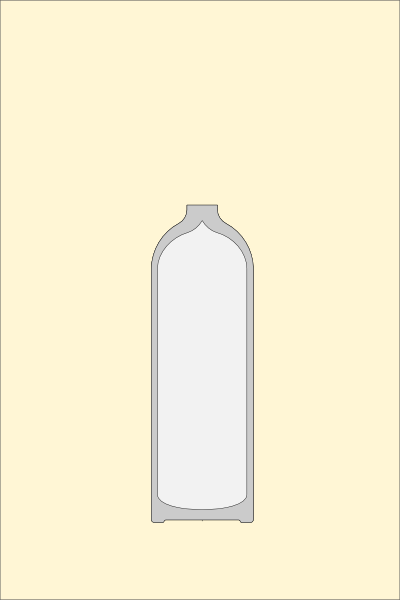
Section after closure of the top end

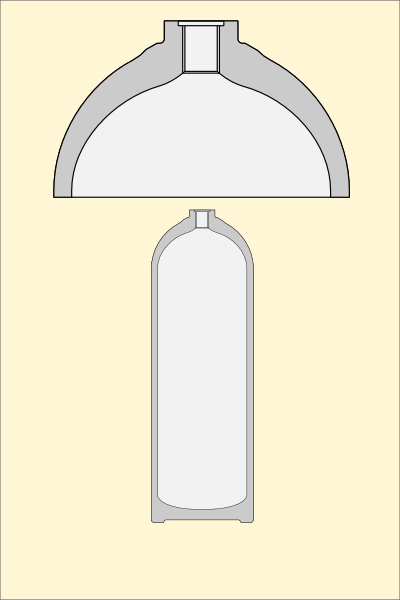
Section showing machined areas of the neck in detail

Cold extrusion (aluminium):

Seamless aluminium cylinders may be manufactured by cold backward extrusion of aluminium billets in a process which first presses the walls and base, then trims the top edge of the cylinder walls, followed by press forming the shoulder and neck.

Hot extrusion (steel):

In the hot extrusion process a billet of steel is cut to size, induction heated to the correct temperature for the alloy, descaled and placed in the die. The metal is backward extruded by forcing the mandrel into it, causing it to flow through the annular gap until a deep cup is formed. This cup is further drawn to diameter and wall thickness reduced and the bottom formed. After inspection and trimming of the open end, the cylinder is hot spun to close the end and form the neck.

==== Drawn ====
Animation showing two stages of deep drawing of a steel plate to a cup, and a similar cup to a diving cylinder blank with domed bottom

Seamless cylinders may also be cold drawn from steel plate discs to a cylindrical cup form, in two to four stages, depending on the final ratio of diameter to cylinder length. After forming the base and side walls, the top of the cylinder is trimmed to length, heated and hot spun to form the shoulder and close the neck. The spinning process thickens the material of the shoulder. The cylinder is heat-treated by quenching and tempering to provide the best strength and toughness.

==== Spun from seamless tube ====
A seamless steel cylinder can also be formed by hot spinning a closure at both ends of a length of seamless tube. The base is first closed completely, and trimmed to form a smooth internal surface before the shoulder and neck are formed.

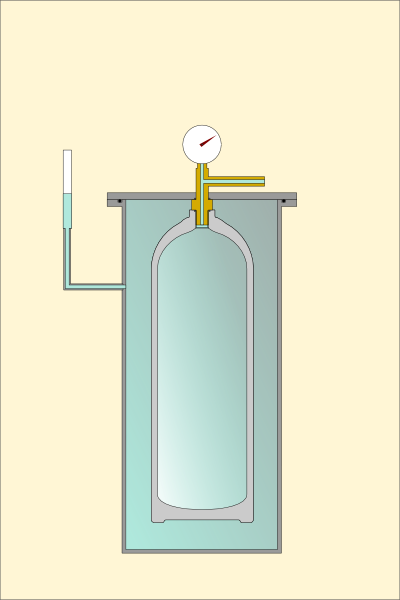
Hydrostatic test of structurally complete cylinder

Regardless of the method used to form the cylinder, it will be machined to finish the neck and cut the neck threads, heat treated, cleaned, and surface finished, stamp marked, tested, and inspected for quality assurance.

=== Composite ===
Composite pressure vessels are generally laid up from filament wound rovings in a thermosetting polymer matrix. The mandrel may be removable after cure, or may remain a part of the finished product, often providing a more reliable gas or liquid-tight liner, or better chemical resistance to the intended contents than the resin matrix. Metallic inserts may be provided for attaching threaded accessories, such as valves and pipes. Advantages claimed for composite pressure vessels are relatively light weight, corrosion resistance, design flexibility and lower fabrication cost for some applictions.

==== Development of composite vessels ====
To classify the different structural principles of gas storage cylinders, 4 types are defined.

- Type 1 – Full metal: Cylinder is made entirely from metal.
- Type 2 – Hoop wrap: Metal cylinder, reinforced by a belt-like hoop wrap with fibre-reinforced resin.
- Type 3 – Fully wrapped, over metal liner: Diagonally wrapped fibres form the load bearing shell on the cylindrical section and at the bottom and shoulder around the metal neck. The metal liner is thin and provides the gas tight barrier.
- Type 4 – Fully wrapped, over non-metal liner: A lightweight thermoplastic liner provides the gas tight barrier, and the mandrel to wrap fibres and resin matrix around. Only the neck which carries the neck thread and its anchor to the liner is made of metal.

Type 2 and 3 cylinders have been in production since around 1995. Type 4 cylinders are commercially available at least since 2016.

==== Winding angle of composite vessels ====
Wound infinite cylindrical shapes optimally take a winding angle of 54.7 degrees to the cylindrical axis, as this gives the necessary twice the strength in the circumferential direction to the longitudinal.

Hoop wound fibre reinforcement is wound at an angle of nearly 90° to the cylinder axis.

==== Flexible composite pressure vessels ====
Low pressure hyperbaric stretchers have been made from fibre reinforced synthetic elastomer, which can be folded for storage. The ends are rigid dished shapes held in place by the internal pressure, and carry all of the penetrations.

=== Surface treatment and finishing ===
Surface treatment may include cleaning, deburring, and passivation to remove any impurities and improve corrosion resistance. The vessel may be finished with a paint system or other coatings to protect it from environmental conditions.

=== Certification ===
After completion, a pressure vessel is inspected to ensure that it complies with all the relevant standards, codes, and specifications, by designated and qualified inspectors, who check dimensional accuracy, weld quality, and structural integrity before issuing the certifications and documentation needed to comply with the relevant regulations.

== Safety ==
=== Overpressure relief ===
As the pressure vessel is designed to a pressure, there is typically a safety valve or relief valve to ensure that this pressure is not exceeded in operation.

There may be a rupture disc fitted to the vessel or the cylinder valve or a fusible plug to protect in case of overheating.

==== Leak before burst ====
Leak before burst describes a pressure vessel designed such that a crack in the vessel will grow through the wall, allowing the contained fluid to escape and reducing the pressure, prior to growing so large as to cause catastrophic fracture at the operating pressure.

Many pressure vessel standards, including the ASME Boiler and Pressure Vessel Code and the AIAA metallic pressure vessel standard, either require pressure vessel designs to be leak before burst, or require pressure vessels to meet more stringent requirements for fatigue and fracture if they are not shown to be leak before burst.

=== Testing and inspection ===
Hydrostatic test (filled with water) pressure is usually 1.5 times working pressure, but US DOT test pressure for scuba cylinders is 5/3 (1.67) times working pressure.

=== Operation standards ===
Pressure vessels are designed to operate safely at a specific pressure and temperature, technically referred to as the "Design Pressure" and "Design Temperature". A vessel that is inadequately designed to handle a high pressure constitutes a very significant safety hazard. Because of that, the design and certification of pressure vessels is governed by design codes such as the ASME Boiler and Pressure Vessel Code in North America, the Pressure Equipment Directive of the EU (PED), Japanese Industrial Standard (JIS), CSA B51 in Canada, Australian Standards in Australia and other international standards like Lloyd's, Germanischer Lloyd, Det Norske Veritas, Société Générale de Surveillance (SGS S.A.), Lloyd's Register Energy Nederland (formerly known as Stoomwezen) etc.

Note that where the pressure-volume product is part of a safety standard, any incompressible liquid in the vessel can be excluded as it does not contribute to the potential energy stored in the vessel, so only the volume of the compressible part such as gas is used.

=== List of standards ===
- EN 13445: The current European Standard, harmonized with the Pressure Equipment Directive (Originally "97/23/EC", since 2014 "2014/68/EU"). Extensively used in Europe.
- ASME Boiler and Pressure Vessel Code Section VIII: Rules for Construction of Pressure Vessels.
- BS 5500: Former British Standard, replaced in the UK by BS EN 13445 but retained under the name PD 5500 for the design and construction of export equipment.
- AD Merkblätter: German standard, harmonized with the Pressure Equipment Directive.
- EN 286 (Parts 1 to 4): European standard for simple pressure vessels (air tanks), harmonized with Council Directive 87/404/EEC.
- BS 4994: Specification for design and construction of vessels and tanks in reinforced plastics.
- ASME PVHO: US standard for Pressure Vessels for Human Occupancy.
- CODAP: French Code for Construction of Unfired Pressure Vessel.
- AS/NZS 1200: Australian and New Zealand Standard for the requirements of Pressure equipment including Pressure Vessels, boilers and pressure piping.
- AS 1210: Australian Standard for the design and construction of Pressure Vessels
- AS/NZS 3788: Australian and New Zealand Standard for the inspection of pressure vessels
- API 510.
- ISO 11439: Compressed natural gas (CNG) cylinders
- IS 2825–1969 (RE1977)_code_unfired_Pressure_vessels.
- FRP tanks and vessels.
- AIAA S-080-1998: AIAA Standard for Space Systems – Metallic Pressure Vessels, Pressurized Structures, and Pressure Components.
- AIAA S-081A-2006: AIAA Standard for Space Systems – Composite Overwrapped Pressure Vessels (COPVs).
- ECSS-E-ST-32-02C Rev.1: Space engineering – Structural design and verification of pressurized hardware
- B51-09 Canadian Boiler, pressure vessel, and pressure piping code.
- HSE guidelines for pressure systems.
- Stoomwezen: Former pressure vessels code in the Netherlands, also known as RToD: Regels voor Toestellen onder Druk (Dutch Rules for Pressure Vessels).
- SANS 10019:2021 South African National Standard: Transportable pressure receptacles for compressed, dissolved and liquefied gases - Basic design, manufacture, use and maintenance.
- SANS 1825:2010 Edition 3: South African National Standard: Gas cylinder test stations ― General requirements for periodic inspection and testing of transportable refillable gas pressure receptacles. ISBN 978-0-626-23561-1

== History ==
A 10,000 psi (69 MPa) pressure vessel from 1919, wrapped with high tensile steel banding and steel rods to secure the end caps.

The earliest documented design of pressure vessels was described in 1495 in the book by Leonardo da Vinci, the Codex Madrid I, in which containers of pressurized air were theorized to lift heavy weights underwater. However, vessels resembling those used today did not come about until the 1800s, when steam was generated in boilers' helping to spur the Industrial Revolution. However, with poor material quality and manufacturing techniques along with improper knowledge of design, operation and maintenance there was a large number of damaging and often deadly explosions associated with these boilers and pressure vessels, with a death occurring on a nearly daily basis in the United States. Local provinces and states in the US began enacting rules for constructing these vessels after some particularly devastating vessel failures occurred killing dozens of people at a time, which made it difficult for manufacturers to keep up with the varied rules from one location to another. The first pressure vessel code was developed starting in 1911 and released in 1914, starting the ASME Boiler and Pressure Vessel Code (BPVC).

In an early effort to design a tank capable of withstanding pressures up to 10,000 psi (69 MPa), a 6-inch (150 mm) diameter tank was developed in 1919 that was spirally-wound with two layers of high tensile strength steel wire to prevent sidewall rupture, and the end caps longitudinally reinforced with lengthwise high-tensile rods. The need for high pressure and temperature vessels for petroleum refineries and chemical plants gave rise to vessels joined with welding instead of rivets (which were unsuitable for the pressures and temperatures required) and in the 1920s and 1930s the BPVC included welding as an acceptable means of construction; welding is the main means of joining metal vessels today.

There have been many advancements in the field of pressure vessel engineering such as advanced non-destructive examination, phased array ultrasonic testing and radiography, new material grades with increased corrosion resistance and stronger materials, and new ways to join materials such as explosion welding, friction stir welding, advanced theories and means of more accurately assessing the stresses encountered in vessels such as with the use of Finite Element Analysis, allowing the vessels to be built safer and more efficiently. Pressure vessels in the USA require BPVC stamping, but the BPVC is not just a domestic code, many other countries have adopted the BPVC as their official code. There are, however, other official codes in some countries, such as Japan, Australia, Canada, Britain, and other countries in the European Union. Nearly all recognize the inherent potential hazards of pressure vessels and the need for standards and codes regulating their design and construction.

== Gallery ==
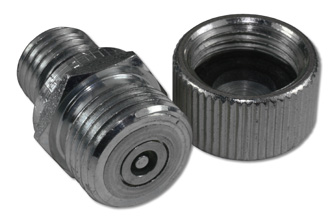
Example of a gas filling valve.

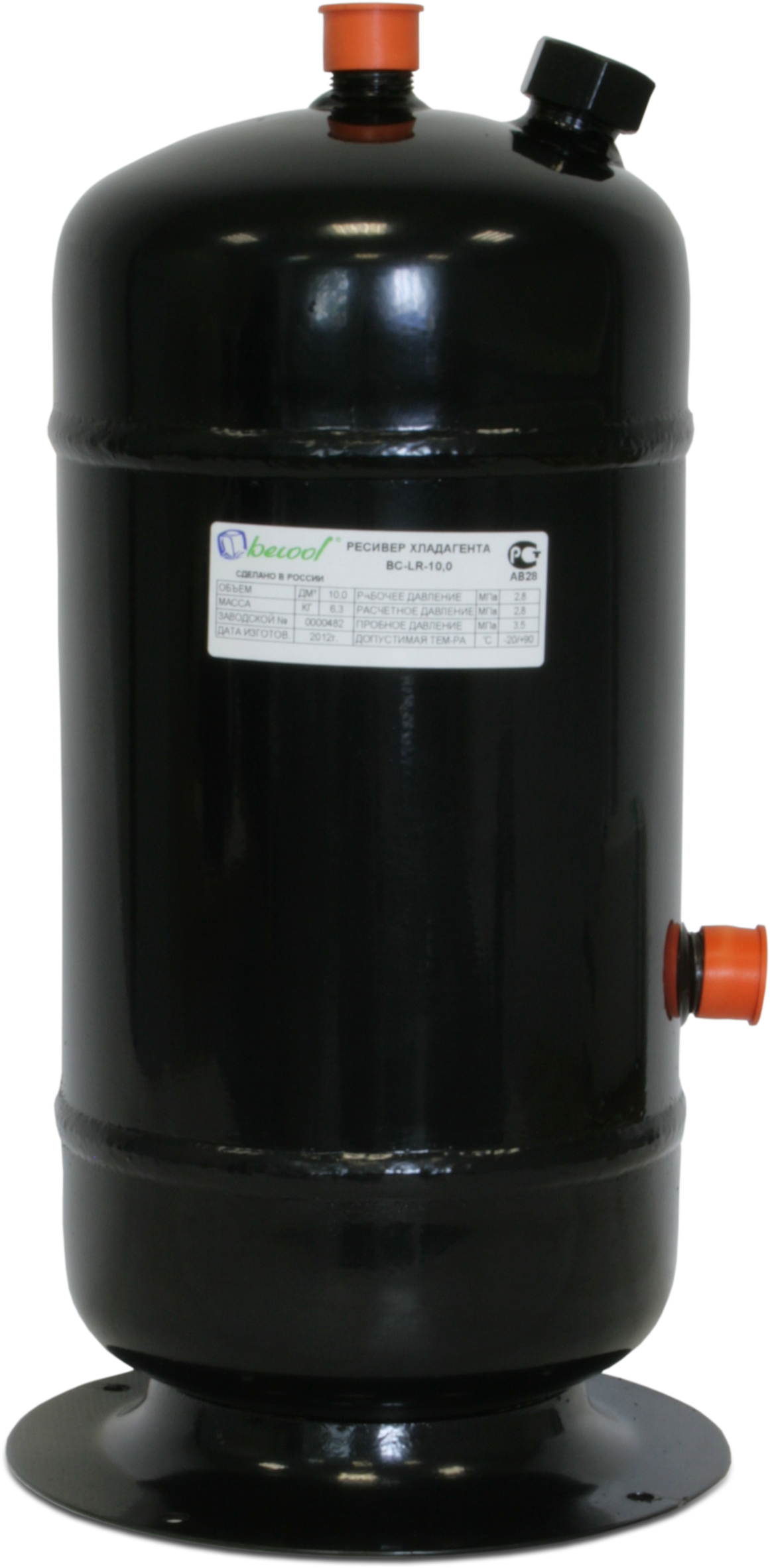
Refrigerant receiver Becool BC-LR-10,0

Bladder accumulator

== Alternatives ==
- Natural gas storage
- Gas holder

Depending on the application and local circumstances, alternatives to pressure vessels exist. Examples can be seen in domestic water collection systems, where the following may be used:

- Gravity-controlled systems which typically consist of an unpressurized water tank at an elevation higher than the point of use. Pressure at the point of use is the result of the hydrostatic pressure caused by the elevation difference. Gravity systems produce 0.43 pounds per square inch (3.0 kPa) per foot of water head (elevation difference). A municipal water supply or pumped water is typically around 90 pounds per square inch (620 kPa).
- Inline pump controllers or pressure-sensitive pumps.
- In nuclear reactors, pressure vessels are primarily used to keep the coolant (water) liquid at high temperatures to increase Carnot efficiency. Other coolants can be kept at high temperatures with much less pressure, explaining the interest in molten salt reactors, lead cooled fast reactors and gas cooled reactors. However, the benefits of not needing a pressure vessel or one of less pressure are in part compensated by drawbacks unique to each alternative approach.

== See also ==
- American Society of Mechanical Engineers (ASME) – Mechanical engineering professional society
- ASME Boiler and Pressure Vessel Code – Technical standard
- Bottled gas – Gas compressed and stored in cylinders
- Composite overwrapped pressure vessel – Pressure vessel with a non-structural liner wrapped with a structural fiber composite
- Compressed-air energy storage – Method for matching variable production with demand
- Compressed natural gas – Fuel gas mainly composed of methane
- Demister – Removal of liquid droplets entrained in a vapor stream
- Fire-tube boiler – Type of boiler
- Gas cylinder – Cylindrical container for storing pressurised gas
- Gasket – Type of mechanical seal
- Head (vessel) – End cap on a cylindrically shaped pressure vessel
- Minimum design metal temperature (MDMT)
- Powerlet – A small, inexpensive, disposable metal gas cylinder for providing pneumatic power - a small, inexpensive, disposable metal gas cylinder for providing pneumatic power
- Pressure Vessel for Human Occupancy – Pressurised Equipment
- Rainwater harvesting – Accumulation of rainwater for reuse
- Relief valve – Safety valve used to control or limit the pressure in a system
- Safety valve – Device for releasing excess pressure in a system
- Scholander pressure bomb – Instrument for measuring water potential of plant tissue – a device for measuring leaf water potentials
- Shell-and-tube heat exchanger – Class of heat exchanger designs
- Tube tool – Class of tool used to service tubing
- Vapor–liquid separator – Device for separating a liquid-vapor mixture into its component phases or Knock-out drum
- Vortex breaker – Device to prevent formation of a vortex at an outlet from a container
- Water-tube boiler – Type of furnace generating steam
- Water well – Excavation or structure to provide access to groundwater

== Sources ==
- A.C. Ugural, S.K. Fenster, Advanced Strength and Applied Elasticity, 4th ed.
- E.P. Popov, Engineering Mechanics of Solids, 1st ed.
- Megyesy, Eugene F. "Pressure Vessel Handbook, 14th Edition." PV Publishing, Inc. Oklahoma City, OK
