= Chemical plant =

Industrial process plant that manufactures chemicals

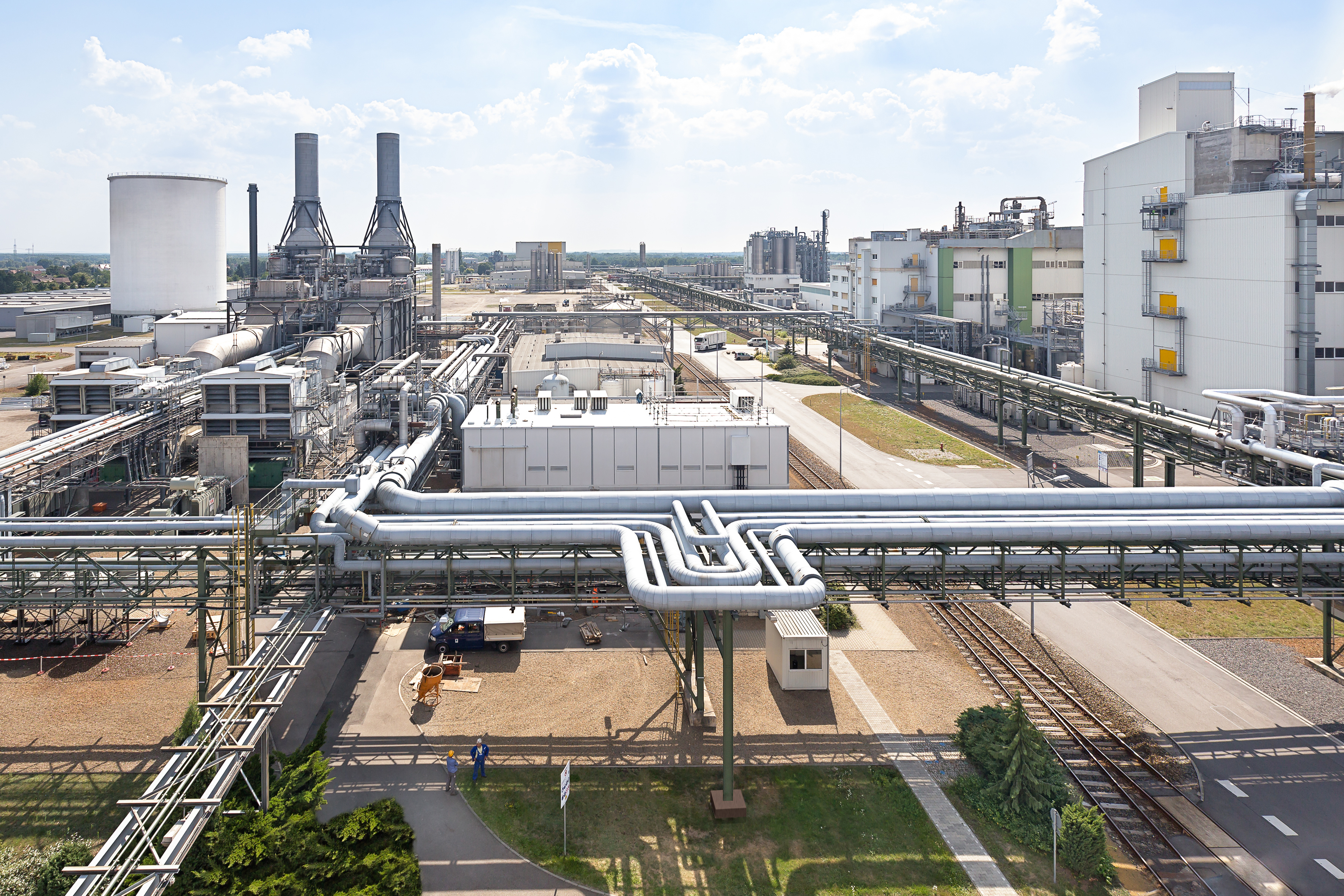
BASF Schwarzheide

A chemical plant is an industrial process plant that manufactures (or otherwise processes) chemicals usually on a large scale. The general objective of a chemical plant is to create new material wealth via the chemical or biological transformation and or separation of materials. Chemical plants use specialized equipment, units, and technology in the manufacturing process. Other kinds of plants, such as polymer, pharmaceutical, food, and some beverage production facilities, power plants, oil refineries or other refineries, natural gas processing and biochemical plants, water and wastewater treatment, and pollution control equipment use many technologies that have similarities to chemical plant technology such as fluid systems and chemical reactor systems. Some would consider an oil refinery or a pharmaceutical or polymer manufacturer to be effectively a chemical plant.

Petrochemical plants (plants using chemicals from petroleum as a raw material or feedstock) are usually located adjacent to an oil refinery to minimize transportation costs for the feedstocks produced by the refinery. Speciality chemical and fine chemical plants are usually much smaller and not as sensitive to location. Tools have been developed for converting a base project cost from one geographic location to another.

== Chemical processes ==
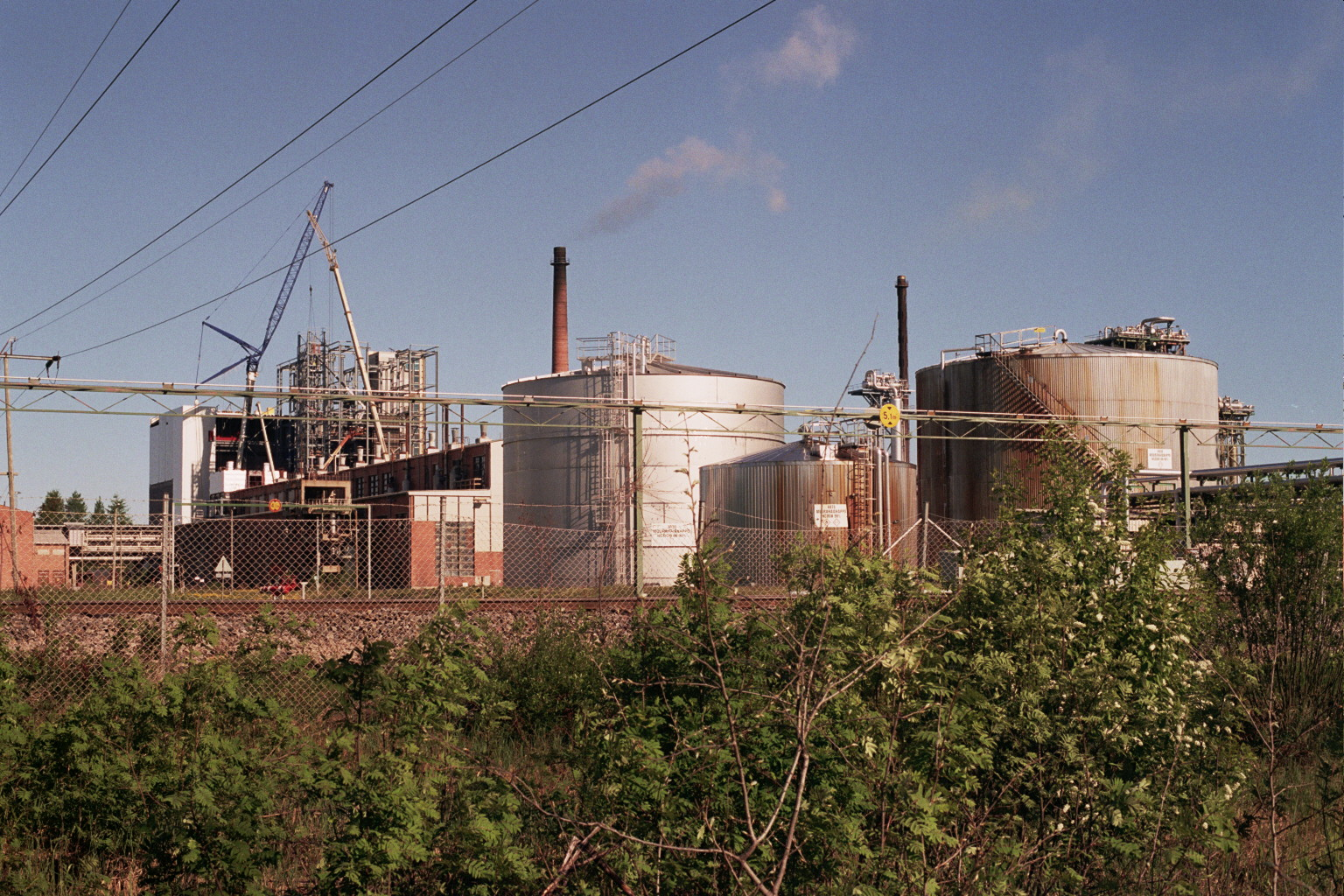
Kemira's chemical plant in Oulu, Finland

Chemical plants use chemical processes, which are detailed industrial-scale methods, to transform feedstock chemicals into products. The same chemical process can be used at more than one chemical plant, with possibly differently scaled capacities at each plant. Also, a chemical plant at a site may be constructed to utilize more than one chemical process, for instance to produce multiple products.

A chemical plant commonly has usually large vessels or sections called units or lines that are interconnected by piping or other material-moving equipment which can carry streams of material. Such material streams can include fluids (gas or liquid carried in piping) or sometimes solids or mixtures such as slurries. An overall chemical process is commonly made up of steps called unit operations which occur in the individual units. A raw material going into a chemical process or plant as input to be converted into a product is commonly called a feedstock, or simply feed. In addition to feedstocks for the plant, as a whole, an input stream of material to be processed in a particular unit can similarly be considered feed for that unit. Output streams from the plant as a whole are final products and sometimes output streams from individual units may be considered intermediate products for their units. However, final products from one plant may be intermediate chemicals used as feedstock in another plant for further processing. For example, some products from an oil refinery may be used as feedstock in petrochemical plants, which may in turn produce feedstocks for pharmaceutical plants.

Either the feedstock(s), the product(s), or both may be individual compounds or mixtures. It is often not worthwhile separating the components in these mixtures completely; specific levels of purity depend on product requirements and process economics.

=== Operations ===
Chemical processes may be run in continuous or batch operation.

Continuous plants are usually used to manufacture commodity or petrochemicals while batch plants are more common in speciality and fine chemical production as well as active pharmaceutical ingredient (API) manufacture.

==== Batch operation ====
In batch operation, production occurs in time-sequential steps in discrete batches. A batch of feedstock(s) is fed (or charged) into a process or unit, then the chemical process takes place, then the product(s) and any other outputs are removed. Such batch production may be repeated over again and again with new batches of feedstock. Batch operation is commonly used in smaller scale plants such as pharmaceutical or specialty chemicals production, for purposes of improved traceability as well as flexibility.

==== Continuous operation ====
In continuous operation, all steps are ongoing continuously in time. During usual continuous operation, the feeding and product removal are ongoing streams of moving material, which together with the process itself, all take place simultaneously and continuously. Chemical plants or units in continuous operation are usually in a steady state or approximate steady state. Steady state means that quantities related to the process do not change as time passes during operation. Such constant quantities include stream flow rates, heating or cooling rates, temperatures, pressures, and chemical compositions at any given point (location). Continuous operation is more efficient in many large-scale operations like petroleum refineries. It is possible for some units to operate continuously and others be in batch operation in a chemical plant; for example, see Continuous distillation and Batch distillation. The amount of primary feedstock or product per unit of time which a plant or unit can process is referred to as the capacity of that plant or unit. For examples: the capacity of an oil refinery may be given in terms of barrels of crude oil refined per day; alternatively chemical plant capacity may be given in tons of product produced per day. In actual daily operation, a plant (or unit) will operate at a percentage of its full capacity. Engineers typically assume 90% operating time for plants which work primarily with fluids, and 80% uptime for plants which primarily work with solids.

== Units and fluid systems ==
Specific unit operations are conducted in specific kinds of units. Although some units may operate at ambient temperature or pressure, many units operate at higher or lower temperatures or pressures. Vessels in chemical plants are often cylindrical with rounded ends, a shape which can be suited to hold either high pressure or vacuum. Chemical reactions can convert certain kinds of compounds into other compounds in chemical reactors. Chemical reactors may be packed beds and may have solid heterogeneous catalysts which stay in the reactors as fluids move through, or may simply be stirred vessels in which reactions occur. Since the surface of solid heterogeneous catalysts may sometimes become "poisoned" from deposits such as coke, regeneration of catalysts may be necessary. Fluidized beds may also be used in some cases to ensure good mixing. There can also be units (or subunits) for mixing (including dissolving), separation, heating, cooling, or some combination of these. For example, chemical reactors often have stirring for mixing and heating or cooling to maintain temperature. When designing plants on a large scale, heat produced or absorbed by chemical reactions must be considered. Some plants may have units with organism cultures for biochemical processes such as fermentation or enzyme production.

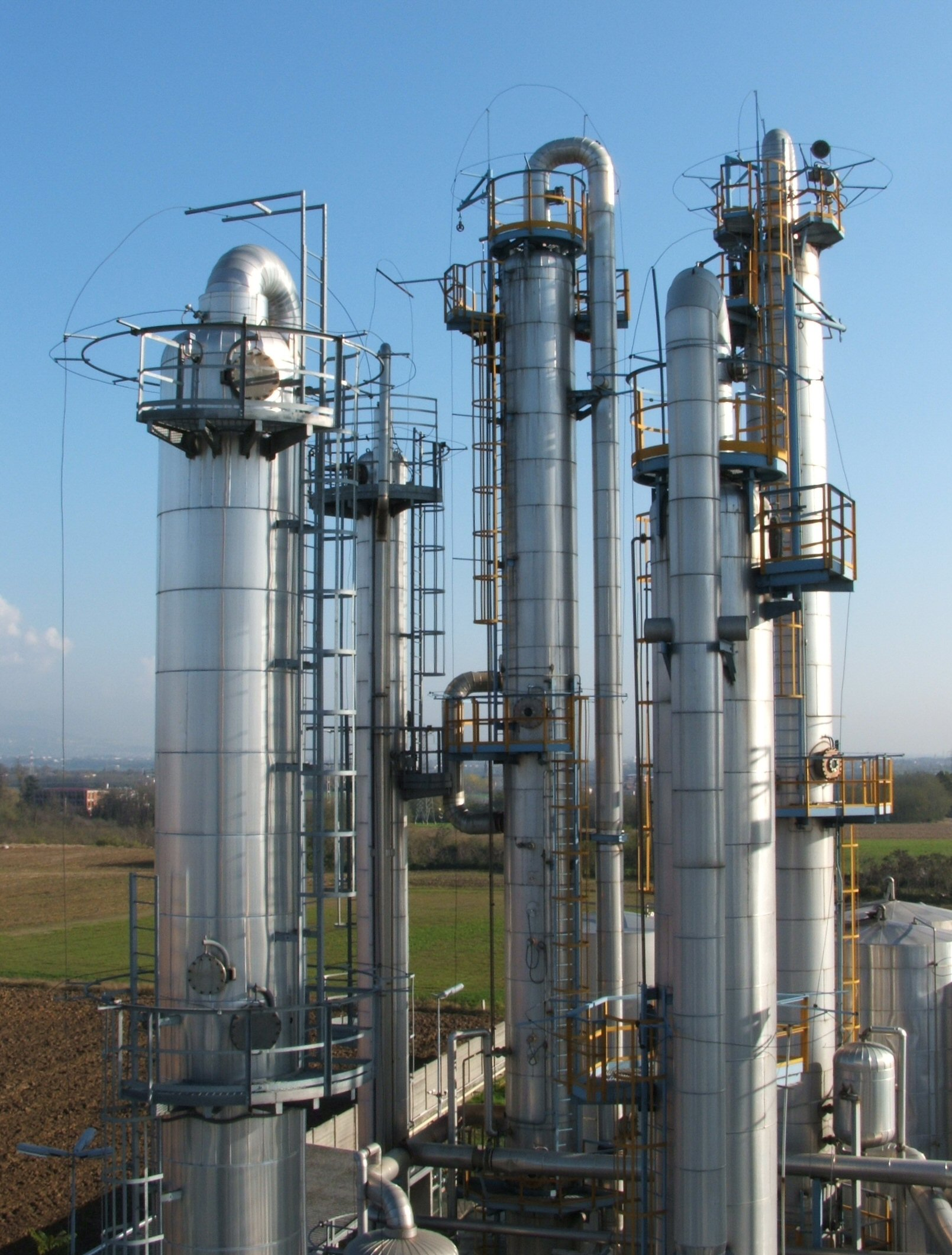
Distillation unit in Italy

Separation processes include filtration, settling (sedimentation), extraction or leaching, distillation, recrystallization or precipitation (followed by filtration or settling), reverse osmosis, drying, and adsorption. Heat exchangers are often used for heating or cooling, including boiling or condensation, often in conjunction with other units such as distillation towers. There may also be storage tanks for storing feedstock, intermediate or final products, or waste. Storage tanks commonly have level indicators to show how full they are. There may be structures holding or supporting sometimes massive units and their associated equipment. There are often stairs, ladders, or other steps for personnel to reach points in the units for sampling, inspection, or maintenance. An area of a plant or facility with numerous storage tanks is sometimes called a tank farm, especially at an oil depot.

Fluid systems for carrying liquids and gases include piping and tubing of various diameter sizes, various types of valves for controlling or stopping flow, pumps for moving or pressurizing liquid, and compressors for pressurizing or moving gases. Vessels, piping, tubing, and sometimes other equipment at high or very low temperatures are commonly covered with insulation for personnel safety and to maintain temperature inside. Fluid systems and units commonly have instrumentation such as temperature and pressure sensors and flow measuring devices at select locations in a plant. Online analyzers for chemical or physical property analysis have become more common. Solvents can sometimes be used to dissolve reactants or materials such as solids for extraction or leaching, to provide a suitable medium for certain chemical reactions to run, or so they can otherwise be treated as fluids.

== Chemical plant design ==
Flow diagram for a typical oil refinery

Today, the fundamental aspects of designing chemical plants are done by chemical engineers. Historically, this was not always the case, and many chemical plants were constructed haphazardly before the discipline of chemical engineering became established. Chemical engineering was first established as a profession in the United Kingdom when the first chemical engineering course was given at the University of Manchester in 1887 by George E. Davis in the form of twelve lectures covering various aspects of industrial chemical practice. As a consequence George E. Davis is regarded as the world's first chemical engineer. Today chemical engineering is a profession and those professional chemical engineers with experience can gain "Chartered" engineer status through the Institution of Chemical Engineers.

In plant design, typically less than 1 percent of ideas for new designs ever become commercialized. During this solution process, typically, cost studies are used as an initial screening to eliminate unprofitable designs. If a process appears profitable, then other factors are considered, such as safety, environmental constraints, controllability, etc. The general goal in plant design, is to construct or synthesize "optimum designs" in the neighborhood of the desired constraints.

Many times chemists research chemical reactions or other chemical principles in a laboratory, commonly on a small scale in a "batch-type" experiment. Chemistry information obtained is then used by chemical engineers, along with expertise of their own, to convert to a chemical process and scale up the batch size or capacity. Commonly, a small chemical plant called a pilot plant is built to provide design and operating information before construction of a large plant. From data and operating experience obtained from the pilot plant, a scaled-up plant can be designed for higher or full capacity. After the fundamental aspects of a plant design are determined, mechanical or electrical engineers may become involved with mechanical or electrical details, respectively. Structural engineers may become involved in the plant design to ensure the structures can support the weight of the units, piping, and other equipment.

The units, streams, and fluid systems of chemical plants or processes can be represented by block flow diagrams which are very simplified diagrams, or process flow diagrams which are somewhat more detailed. The streams and other piping are shown as lines with arrow heads showing usual direction of material flow. In block diagrams, units are often simply shown as blocks. Process flow diagrams may use more detailed symbols and show pumps, compressors, and major valves. Likely values or ranges of material flow rates for the various streams are determined based on desired plant capacity using material balance calculations. Energy balances are also done based on heats of reaction, heat capacities, expected temperatures, and pressures at various points to calculate amounts of heating and cooling needed in various places and to size heat exchangers. Chemical plant design can be shown in fuller detail in a piping and instrumentation diagram (P&ID) which shows all piping, tubing, valves, and instrumentation, typically with special symbols. Showing a full plant is often complicated in a P&ID, so often only individual units or specific fluid systems are shown in a single P&ID.

In the plant design, the units are sized for the maximum capacity each may have to handle. Similarly, sizes for pipes, pumps, compressors, and associated equipment are chosen for the flow capacity they have to handle. Utility systems such as electric power and water supply should also be included in the plant design. Additional piping lines for non-routine or alternate operating procedures, such as plant or unit startups and shutdowns, may have to be included. Fluid systems design commonly includes isolation valves around various units or parts of a plant so that a section of a plant could be isolated in case of a problem such as a leak in a unit. If pneumatically or hydraulically actuated valves are used, a system of pressurizing lines to the actuators is needed. Any points where process samples may have to be taken should have sampling lines, valves, and access to them included in the detailed design. If necessary, provisions should be made for reducing high pressure or temperature of a sampling stream, such including a pressure reducing valve or sample cooler.

Units and fluid systems in the plant including all vessels, piping, tubing, valves, pumps, compressors, and other equipment must be rated or designed to be able to withstand the entire range of pressures, temperatures, and other conditions which they could possibly encounter, including any appropriate safety factors. All such units and equipment should also be checked for materials compatibility to ensure they can withstand long-term exposure to the chemicals they will come in contact with. Any closed system in a plant which has a means of pressurizing possibly beyond the rating of its equipment, such as heating, exothermic reactions, or certain pumps or compressors, should have an appropriately sized pressure relief valve included to prevent overpressurization for safety. Frequently all of these parameters (temperatures, pressures, flow, etc.) are exhaustively analyzed in combination through a Hazop or fault tree analysis, to ensure that the plant has no known risk of serious hazard.

Within any constraints the plant is subject to, design parameters are optimized for good economic performance while ensuring the safety and welfare of personnel and the surrounding community. For flexibility, a plant may be designed to operate in a range around some optimal design parameters in case feedstock or economic conditions change and re-optimization is desirable. In more modern times, computer simulations or other computer calculations have been used to help in chemical plant design or optimization.

== Plant operation ==
=== Process control ===
In process control, information gathered automatically from various sensors or other devices in the plant is used to control various equipment for running the plant, thereby controlling operation of the plant. Instruments receiving such information signals and sending out control signals to perform this function automatically are process controllers. Previously, pneumatic controls were sometimes used. Electrical controls are now common. A plant often has a control room with displays of parameters such as key temperatures, pressures, fluid flow rates and levels, operating positions of key valves, pumps, and other equipment, etc. In addition, operators in the control room can control various aspects of the plant operation, often including overriding automatic control. Process control with a computer represents more modern technology. Based on possible changing feedstock composition, changing products requirements or economics, or other changes in constraints, operating conditions may be re-optimized to maximize profit.

=== Workers ===
As in any industrial setting, there are a variety of workers working throughout a chemical plant facility, often organized into departments, sections, or other work groups. Such workers typically include engineers, plant operators, and maintenance technicians. Other personnel at the site could include chemists, management/administration, and office workers. Types of engineers involved in operations or maintenance may include chemical process engineers, mechanical engineers for maintaining mechanical equipment, and electrical/computer engineers for electrical or computer equipment.

=== Transport ===
Large quantities of fluid feedstock or product may enter or leave a plant by pipeline, railroad tank car, or tanker truck. For example, petroleum commonly comes to a refinery by pipeline. Pipelines can also carry petrochemical feedstock from a refinery to a nearby petrochemical plant. Natural gas is a product which comes all the way from a natural gas processing plant to final consumers by pipeline or tubing. Large quantities of liquid feedstock are typically pumped into process units. Smaller quantities of feedstock or product may be shipped to or from a plant in drums. Use of drums about 55 gallons in capacity is common for packaging industrial quantities of chemicals. Smaller batches of feedstock may be added from drums or other containers to process units by workers.

=== Maintenance ===
In addition to feeding and operating the plant, and packaging or preparing the product for shipping, plant workers are needed for taking samples for routine and troubleshooting analysis and for performing routine and non-routine maintenance. Routine maintenance can include periodic inspections and replacement of worn catalyst, analyzer reagents, various sensors, or mechanical parts. Non-routine maintenance can include investigating problems and then fixing them, such as leaks, failure to meet feed or product specifications, mechanical failures of valves, pumps, compressors, sensors, etc.

=== Statutory and regulatory compliance ===
When working with chemicals, safety is a concern in order to avoid problems such as chemical accidents. In the United States, the law requires that employers provide workers working with chemicals with access to a material safety data sheet (MSDS) for every kind of chemical they work with. An MSDS for a certain chemical is prepared and provided by the supplier to whoever buys the chemical. Other laws covering chemical safety, hazardous waste, and pollution must be observed, including statutes such as the Resource Conservation and Recovery Act (RCRA) and the Toxic Substances Control Act (TSCA), and regulations such as the Chemical Facility Anti-Terrorism Standards in the United States. Hazmat (hazardous materials) teams are trained to deal with chemical leaks or spills. Process Hazard Analysis (PHA) is used to assess potential hazards in chemical plants. In 1998, the U. S. Chemical Safety and Hazard Investigation Board has become operational.

== Clustering of commodity chemical plants ==
Chemical Plants used particularly for commodity chemical and petrochemical manufacture, are located in relatively few manufacturing locations around the world largely due to infrastructural needs. This is less important for speciality or fine chemical batch plants. Not all commodity/petrochemicals are produced in any one location but groups of related materials often are, to induce industrial symbiosis as well as material, energy and utility efficiency and other economies of scale. These manufacturing locations often have business clusters of units called chemical plants that share utilities and large scale infrastructure such as power stations, port facilities, road and rail terminals. In the United Kingdom for example there are four main locations for commodity chemical manufacture: near the River Mersey in Northwest England, on the Humber on the East coast of Yorkshire, in Grangemouth near the Firth of Forth in Scotland and on Teesside as part of the Northeast of England Process Industry Cluster (NEPIC). Approximately 50% of the UK's petrochemicals, which are also commodity chemicals, are produced by the industry cluster companies on Teesside at the mouth of the River Tees on three large chemical parks at Wilton, Billingham and Seal Sands.

== Corrosion and use of new materials ==
Corrosion in chemical process plants is a major issue that consumes billions of dollars yearly. Electrochemical corrosion of metals is pronounced in chemical process plants due to the presence of acid fumes and other electrolytic interactions. Recently, FRP (Fibre-reinforced plastic) is used as a material of construction. The British standard specification BS4994 is widely used for design and construction of the vessels, tanks, etc.

== See also ==
- Chemical industry
- Chemical process modeling
- FRP tanks and vessels - chemical process plant equipment made of FRP
- BS4994
- Electrical equipment in hazardous areas
- Instrumentation in petrochemical industries
- Chemical accident
- Chemical plant cost indexes
- Fine chemicals
- Speciality chemicals
- Petrochemical
- Northeast of England Process Industry Cluster
- Institution of Chemical Engineers
- S-graph
- Unit operations
