= BS EN 13121-3 =

GRP tanks and vessels for use above ground, design and workmanship EU Standard

BS EN 13121-3 is European Standard adopted by UK, titled "GRP tanks and vessels for use above ground. Design and workmanship". Design and workmanship is the final part within a four parts standard series which specifies the necessary requirements for design, fabrication, inspection and testing by manufacturers and specifiers within the area of chemical storage.

The standard was prepared under the European Commission Mandate 83/139/EEC the Pressure Equipment Directive (PED). In Europe this has been in force since May 2002 and all organizations in the European Union are obliged to comply with it.

== Industry Concern ==
With the publication of BS EN 13121-3, BS 4994:1987 Specification for design and construction of vessels and tanks in reinforced plastics is declared obsolescent in European Union. However FRP fabricators and design engineers elsewhere are still using it, as it covers those tanks still in service as tanks made from GRP are generally accepted to have a long working life.

== See also ==
- BS4994
- FRP tanks and vessels
