= Forming (metalworking) =

Reshaping a metal workpiece via deformation

In metalworking, forming is the fashioning of metal parts and objects through mechanical deformation; the workpiece is reshaped without adding or removing material, and its mass remains unchanged. Forming operates on the materials science principle of plastic deformation, where the physical shape of a material is permanently deformed.

== Characteristics ==
Metal forming tends to have more uniform characteristics across its subprocesses than its contemporary processes, cutting and joining.

On the industrial scale, forming is characterized by:

- Very high loads and stresses required, between 50 and 2500 N/mm^{2} (7-360 ksi)
- Large, heavy, and expensive machinery in order to accommodate such high stresses and loads
- Production runs with many parts, to maximize the economy of production and compensate for the expense of the machine tools

== Forming processes ==
Forming processes tend to be categorised by differences in effective stresses. These categories and descriptions are highly simplified, since the stresses operating at a local level in any given process are very complex and may involve many varieties of stresses operating simultaneously, or it may involve stresses which change over the course of the operation.

Compressive forming involves those processes where the primary means of plastic deformation is uni- or multiaxial compressive loading.

- Rolling, where the material is passed through a pair of rollers
- Extrusion, where the material is pushed through an orifice
- Die forming, where the material is stamped by a press around or onto a die
- Forging, where the material is shaped by localized compressive forces
- Indenting, where a tool is pressed into the workpiece

=== Tensile forming ===
Tensile forming involves those processes where the primary means of plastic deformation is uni- or multiaxial tensile stress.

- Stretching, where a tensile load is applied along the longitudinal axis of the workpiece
- Expanding, where the circumference of a hollow body is increased by tangential loading
- Recessing, where depressions and holes are formed through tensile loading

=== Combined tensile and compressive forming ===
This category of forming processes involves those operations where the primary means of plastic deformation involves both tensile stresses and compressive loads.

- Pulling through a die
- Tandem rolling mill
- Deep drawing
- Spinning
- Flange forming
- Upset bulging

=== Bending ===
This category of forming processes involves those operations where the primary means of plastic deformation is a bending load.

=== Shearing ===
This category of forming processes involves those operations where the primary means of plastic deformation is a shearing load.

== See also ==
- The Forming section of List of manufacturing processes
- Ferrous metallurgy
- Moulding
- Pressing
