= ECTFE =

Corrosion-resistant polymer

Names
- IUPAC name poly(1-chloro-1,2,2-trifluorobutane-1,4-diyl)
- Other names poly(ethene-co-chlorotrifluoroethene)

Identifiers
CAS Number	25101-45-5
ChemSpider	none
CompTox Dashboard (EPA)	DTXSID60947962
- InChI: InChI=1S/C2F4.C2H4/c3-1(4)2(5)6;1-2/h;1-2H2 Key: QHSJIZLJUFMIFP-UHFFFAOYSA-N
- Except where otherwise noted, data are given for materials in their standard state (at 25 °C [77 °F], 100 kPa). verify (what is ?) Infobox references

ECTFE (ethylene-chlorotrifluoroethylene) is an alternating copolymer of ethylene and chlorotrifluoroethylene. It is a semi-crystalline fluoropolymer (a partly fluorinated polymer), with chemical corrosion resistance properties.

== Physical and chemical properties ==
ECTFE is resistant to acids at high concentrations and temperatures, caustic media, oxidizing agents, and many solvents. Its chemical resistance is similar to that of PTFE. Permeation of this polymer by large molecules is slow and thus is not relevant in final applications. Small molecules, however, may permeate through the polymer matrix. In lining or coating applications using ECTFE, permeability of certain small molecules determines the lifetime of anti-corrosion protection. Small molecules such as H_{2}O, O_{2}, Cl_{2}, H_{2}S, HCl, HF, HBr, N_{2}, H_{2}, and CH_{3}OH are relatively mobile in the polymer matrix and lead to measurable effects. Permeation resistance of the polymer is critical for lining and coating applications because permeating species may attack the underlying mechanical layers, such as fibre-reinforced plastic (FRP) or steel. High permeation resistance to small molecules is a consequence of the free volume occupied by the chlorine atoms in the polymer chain.

ECTFE has a continuous usage temperature range between –76°C and +150°C (–105°F to +300°F). It has strong impact resistance and a Young's modulus in the range of 1700 MPa, allowing for self-standing items and pressure piping systems. The polymer maintains high impact strength in cryogenic applications.

In terms of fire resistance, ECTFE shows a limiting oxygen index of 52%. This value places it between the fully fluorinated polymers PTFE, PFA, and FEP with a limiting oxygen index of 95% and other partially fluorinated polymers like PVDF with a limiting oxygen index of 44% or ETFE with a limiting oxygen index of 30%.

ECTFE acts as an electrical insulator, with high resistivity and a low dielectric constant as well as a low dissipation factor, allowing its use for wire and cable primary and secondary jacketing. ECTFE has good ultraviolet (UV) resistance, in particular against UV-A and UV-B. Films made of the polymer can be transparent.

== Applications ==
ECTFE is applied in several ways:

- By electrostatic powder coating on metal surfaces
- By rotolining on metal surfaces rotolining grade Halar 6012F
- By sheet lining on metal surface or on FRP (glass fiber, carbon fibers, etc.)
- By extrusion or injection molding of self-standing items, in particular pressure pipes
- By rotomolding of self-standing items like tanks or other shapes (rotomolding grade)
- As a protective film using an adequate adhesive

ECTFE powder is most commonly used in electrostatic powder coating. Such coatings have a typical thickness of 0.8 mm but can be applied up to 2 mm with a special grade for high build up.

Extrusion of ECTFE fabric-backed sheets and subsequent fabrication into vessels, pipes or valves is done in the chemical industry. Thick sheets are compression molded and can be manufactured to 50 mm in thickness. They are used in the semiconductor industry for wet benches or machining other parts.

The most common application of ECTFE is for corrosion protection, for which it is used in industries including:

- Bleaching towers in pulp and paper
- Sulfuric acid production and storage
- Flue gas treatment in particular in the SNOX and WSA processes
- Electrolysis collectors or drying towers in the chlorine industry
- Transport vessels for hazardous goods, in particular class 8 trucks
- Halogen-related industry (bromine, chlorine, fluorine)
- Acid handling (sulfuric acid, nitric acid, phosphoric acid, hydrogen halides, hydrogen sulfide, etc.)
- Mining applications, in particular high pressure heap leaching

ECTFE has been widely used in the semiconductor industry for wet tool and tubing systems for lithographic chemicals.

It is also used in the pharmaceutical industry.

ECTFE is used for primary and secondary jacketing in specialty cables like data cables or self-regulating heating cables, applications where good fire resistance and electrical properties are key properties. It is also used for braiding in that field.

ECTFE in the form of a monofilament fiber is used in flue gas treatment and in certain chemical processes.

Unlike PTFE, ECTFE can be crimped, which allows its production in the form of nonwoven fibers with high surface area and porosity. Even though such material has low chemical reactivity, ECTFE in general has somewhat lower chemical resistance compared to PTFE.

ECTFE is used for manufacturing gaskets to store liquid oxygen and other propellants for aerospace applications.

== See also ==
- BS 4994 ECTFE as a thermoplastic lining for dual laminate chemical process plant equipment
- RTP-1 ECTFE as a thermoplastic lining for dual laminate ASME stamped vessels
