= MORGOIL Bearings =

The MORGOIL Bearings division is a business unit of Primetals Technologies USA LLC (formerly Morgan Construction Company), designers, manufacturers and service providers of high speed rod, bar, combination mills and handling equipment for the steel and non-ferrous industries. MORGOIL is headquartered in Worcester, Massachusetts, United States.

In 2008 100% of Morgan's shares were acquired by the Industry Solutions (IS) division of Siemens headquartered in Alpharetta, Georgia, United States.

In 2015 Primetals Technologies, headquartered in London, England was formed by bringing together Siemens VAI Metals Technologies and Japan's Mitsubishi Hitachi Metals Machinery (MHMM).

Mitsubishi Hitachi Metals Machinery (MHMM), an MHI consolidated group company with equity participation by Hitachi and IHI Corporation, holds a 51 percent stake and Siemens a 49 percent stake in the joint venture.

== History ==
Morgan Construction Company has been building high-production, continuous, 2-high hot mills since 1888. These mills were designed to produce wire rod, merchant bars, small angles, skelp, sheet, bar, and billets, and were in operation in practically every country where the manufacture of steel has assumed large enough proportions to warrant this type of mill.

As the demands for rolled steel products developed, the speeds and loads of the mills increased, and the problem of adequate roll bearings became more and more acute. First introduced in 1932, MORGOIL bearings were welcomed by the rolling mill industry where roll neck bearing problems were hampering the development of faster and more powerful rolling mills. MORGOIL bearings provided higher load capacities, higher speed capabilities, lower power consumption, and longer life than existing bearing choices

MORGOIL bearings are totally enclosed, precision journal bearings that operate on a hydrodynamically generated film of oil. This oil film has a very high load-carrying capacity, and since there is no metal-to-metal contact, wear is negligible.

== Concept ==
The principal parts of a MORGOIL bearing are relatively uncomplicated. The sleeve is an alloy steel forging, heat-treated and ground to a fine finish. The sleeve has a precision non-locking tapered bore, which fits on, and is keyed to, the tapered roll neck, thus becoming the bearing journal. Surrounding the sleeve is the bushing, fixed in the chock, which carries the radial load. The precision sleeve rotating in the bushing on an unbroken film of oil provides a bearing with a low coefficient of friction, low power consumption, high load capacity, high stiffness, and freedom from wear and fatigue. Adjacent to the outbound end of the sleeve is the thrust bearing, which is typically a double-acting roller (or ball bearing in some applications depending on the size of the radial bearing). The thrust bearing is mounted in such a manner that it only carries the thrust load and is not subject to any radial loading.

These principal bearing components are assembled in a chock with a sleeve ring, chock end plate, end cover and inboard sealing arrangement. The assembly is secured to the roll neck by a locking arrangement.

The original design of the bearing had a long keyed sleeve and a threaded ring (TR) lock. This was the typical design through the 1950s when the quick-change (QC) mechanical lock was introduced. Short-key and keyless KL® bearings were introduced in the late 1970s to reduce roll force variation and allow the mill operators to produce a higher-quality product.

== Focus ==
While most focus in the bearing is on the load carrying components, locking is equally as important since these components must be held securely on the roll neck. HB (hydraulic bayonet) locking was introduced in 1980 provides safe and repeatable performance. Later locking concepts such as the RM (removable mount) and CB (compact bayonet) have been more recently introduced, but they all share hydraulic mount and dismount functions.

In 2001 the first major upgrade to bearing capacity was introduced with the MORGOIL KLX bearing. This bearing uses thin sleeve technology to increase the load bearing area of the radial bearing, allowing more force to be carried in the same space as compared to older designs. The entire axial assembly of this family of bearing was also upgraded to function properly at the increased loads allowed by use of the KLX.

== Oil film theory as applied to MORGOIL bearings ==
The typical MORGOIL tapered neck bearing assembly consists of a sleeve with a non-locking tapered bore that facilitates removal of the bearing chock assembly from the roll neck. The sleeve, keyed to the neck to prevent creeping during operation, produces a slight interference fit on the roll neck by means of the push-up force used to mount the bearing on the roll. The outside diameter of the sleeve is ground and polished serving as the journal surface of the bearing. Sleeve wall thickness variation is controlled to 0.005 mm (0.0002 in.) to minimize roll force variation.

The bimetal bushing, which is locked into the bore of the chock, has a high tin Babbitt lining in a steel shell. Loading of the bearing is always vertical, with the load bearing section at the top of the upper bearing and at the bottom of the lower bearing. The bearing lining is undercut on the horizontal centerline (the rebore) so that oil entering the bearing is drawn in by the rotation and eccentricity of the journal. Oil is generally supplied to the rebore following the minimum film thickness, then drawn through the unloaded half of the bushing before entering the load zone, where the hydrodynamic oil film and pressure field are formed. The total oil flow is specified to optimize the cooling of the bearing. Oil flow and feed pressure are specified for each individual mill during the design phase and each mill has specific documentation defining these parameters.

Design of mill oil film bearings had always been based on the assumption that the bearings followed hydrodynamic theory developed in England by Prof. Osborne Reynolds as described in his paper from 1886. In the 1950s, Raimondi & Boyd published general design tables for hydrodynamic bearings which supplanted the more basic approach, but the underlying assumption of hydrodynamic operation remained.

Morgan Construction Company built a test stand that held a completely instrumented full size mill bearing in the 1990s. Proprietary research conducted by the Morgan Construction Company from 1999 to 2001 showed that mill bearings operated on the principals of elasto-hydrodynamic lubrication (EHD), where the elasticity of the structure plays a significant role in the size and shape of the pressure field that supports the bearing. In the case of tapered neck bearings, very small deflections in the sleeve in the load zone of the bearing allow the bearing to redistribute the pressure field in a manner that increases support area and significantly reduces peak pressure in the oil film. Oil film thickness is also significantly larger than predicted by hydrodynamic theory.

A bearing that takes advantage of the EHD behavior was introduced in 2001. Called the KLX bearing, it has a thinner sleeve that is intentionally designed to redistribute the load as much as possible during operation, allowing the bearing to support more load than previous designs of the same size.
