= Fibre-reinforced plastic tanks and vessels =

FRP (Fibreglass Reinforced Plastics, also known as GRP, or Glass Reinforced Plastics) is a modern composite material of construction for chemical plant, pulp and paper mill, and food and pharmaceutical equipment like tanks and vessels. Chemical equipment that range in size from less than a metre to 20 metres are fabricated using FRP as material of construction.

FRP Chemical Equipments are manufactured mainly by Hand Lay-up and filament winding processes. BS4994 still remains a key standard for this class of items.

== Dual Laminate ==
Due to the corrosion resistant nature of FRP, the tank can be made entirely from the composite, or a second liner can be used. In either case, the inner liner is made using different material properties than the structural portion (Hence the name dual (meaning two) and laminate (a word commonly used for a layer of a composite material))

The liner, if made of FRP is usually resin rich and utilizes a different type of glass, called "C-Glass", while the structural portion uses "E-Glass". The thermoplastic liner is usually 2.3 mm thick (100 mils). This thermoplastic liner is not considered to contribute mechanical strength. The FRP liner is usually cured before winding or lay-up continues, by using either a BPO/DMA system, or using an MEKP catalyst with cobalt in the resin.

If the liner is not made of FRP, there are multiple choices for a thermoplastic liner. The engineer will need to design the tank based on the chemical corrosion requirement of the equipment. PP, PVC, PTFE, ECTFE, ETFE, FEP, CPVC, PVDF are used as common thermoplastic liners.

Due to FRP's weakness to buckling, but immense strength against tensile forces and its resistance to corrosion, a hydrostatic tank is a logical application for the composite. The tank is designed to withstand the hydrostatic forces required by orienting the fibres in the tangential direction. This increases the hoop strength, making the tanks anisotropically stronger than steel (pound per pound).

FRP which is constructed over the liner provides the structural strength requirements to withstand design conditions such as internal pressure or vacuum, hydrostatic loads, seismic loads (including fluid sloshing), wind loads, regeneration hydrostatic loads, and even snow loads.

== Applications ==
FRP tanks and vessels designed as per BS 4994 are widely used in the chemical industry in the following sectors: chlor-alkali manufacturers, fertilizer, wood pulp and paper, metal extraction, refining, electroplating, brine, vinegar, food processing, and in air pollution control equipment, especially at municipal waste water treatment plants and water treatment plants.

== Types ==
FRP tanks and process vessels are used in various commercial and industrial applications, including chemical, water & wastewater, food & beverage, mining & metals, power, energy, and high-purity applications.

=== Scrubbers ===
FRP Scrubbers are used for scrubbing fluids. In air pollution control technology, scrubbers come in three varieties, Dry Media, Wet Media, and Biological.

==== Dry Media ====
Dry media typically involved a dry, solid media (such as activated carbon) suspended in the middle of the vessel on a system of beam supports and grating. The media controls the concentration of a pollutant in the incoming gas via adsorption and absorption.

These vessels have several design constraints. They must be designed for

- Unloading and Reloading the media
- Corrosive effects of the fluid to be treated
- Internal and External Pressure
- Environmental Loads
- Support Loads for the grating and support system
- Lifting and Installing the Vessel
- Regenerating the media inside the vessel
- Internal Stack supports for a dual bed construction
- Redundancy for preventative maintenance
- Demisting to remove liquids that degrade the dry media
- Condensate removal, to remove any liquid that condenses inside the vessel

==== Wet media ====
Wet media scrubbers typically douse the polluted fluid in a scrubbing solution. These vessels must be designed to more stringent criteria. The design constraints for wet media scrubbers typically include:

- The corrosive effects of the polluted fluid and the scrubbing solution.
- The high pressures and loading of a spray system
- Aerodynamics of the internal media to ensure that there is no bypass
- Internal Support systems
- Reservoir of scrubbing fluid for recirculation.
- Internal and External Pressure
- Environmental Loads
- Lifting and Installing the vessel
- Plumbing of the scrubbing fluid to the vessel
- Draining to remove vessel sump fluids

In the case of a decarbonator, used in reverse osmosis systems to limit the concentration of gases in the water, the air is the scrubbing fluid and the sprayed liquid is the polluted stream. As the water is sprayed out of the scrubber, the air strips the aqueous gasses out of the water, to be treated in another vessel.

==== Biological ====
Biological scrubbers are structurally identical to the wet media scrubbers, but vary in their design. The vessel is designed to be larger, so the air moves slower through the vessel. The media is designed to encourage biological growth, and the water that sprays through the vessel is filled with nutrients to encourage bacteria to grow. In such scrubbers, the bacteria scrub the pollutant. Also, instead of a single, large support system (typically 10 feet depth of media for chemical scrubbers), there are multiple stages of media support, that can change the design requirements of the vessel. (See biofilter for similar technology that is usually performed outside of an FRP vessel.)

==== Tanks ====
A typical storage tank made of FRP has an inlet, an outlet, a vent, an access port, a drain, and an overflow nozzle. However, there are other features that can be included in the tank. Ladders on the outside allow for easy access to the roof for loading. The vessel must be designed to withstand the load of someone standing on these ladders, and even withstand a person standing on the roof. Sloped bottoms allow for easier draining. Level gauges allow someone to accurately read the liquid level in the tank. The vessel must be resistant to the corrosive nature of the fluid it contains. Typically, these vessels have a secondary containment structure, in case the vessel bursts.

=== Size ===
The size of FRP Vessels is rarely limited by manufacturing technology, but rather by economics. Tanks smaller than 7,500 liters (2,000 gallons) are easily manufactured out of cheaper materials, such as HDPE or PVC. Tanks larger than four meters are generally limited by shipping constraints, and the economics suggest a concrete or steel tank fabricated at the tank's location.

For chemical storage and air pollution control, the choice is to make multiple tanks of smaller diameters. For example, one of the largest odor control projects in California, the Orange County Sanitation District will utilize 24 vessels total to treat 188,300 cfm (86,200 L/s) of odorous air, with a design of up to 50 ppm of hydrogen sulfide. For an equivalent single vessel to perform as well as the 13 headworks trickling filters, the single vessel would have to be over 36 feet in diameter. This would be impractical due to the high shipping requirements, internal supports, spray nozzles and other internals. Plus this single vessel would not incorporate redundancy for preventive maintenance.

=== Limitations ===
Typical FRP vessels and constructs limits are almost entirely based on the application parameters and resins used. The thermoplastic resin will suffer from creep at elevated temperatures and ultimately fail. However, new chemistry has produced resins that claim to be able to achieve even higher temperatures, which expand this field immensely. The typical maximum is 200 degrees Celsius.

Fiberglass vessels and constructs are also susceptible to degradation upon long-term exposure to sunlight. This deterioration is brought about by chemical changes which occur as a result of exposure to the ultraviolet (UV) portion of light. Degradation results in the fiberglass tanks and constructs, opening pores in the surface allowing styrene to wick out of the vessel or construct's walls, causing them to become embrittled, reducing the impact resistance and potential elongation properties of the part. Degradation from UV light can be effectively inhibited by the addition of exterior gelcoats and sealants, which protect the fiberglass construct through removing UV access to the product's surface thus deflecting UV energy.

The UV life of a part is dependent upon UV additive level and type as well as part thickness and design, pigment type, level and effectiveness of dispersion, processing conditions and the geographic location where the molded part is used (see Figure 3). It is important when comparing resin UV performance to ensure that the testing has been done on a consistent basis. In Figure 1, accelerated weathering data is presented. Generally, 2,000 hours corresponds to 1 year in Florida and 1,400 hours to 1 year in Southern Canada. Often terms like “UV-8” are used. UV-8 means the material can withstand 8,000 hours in a Xenon Ci-65 weatherometer. UV-2 or UV-4 would mean 2,000 or 4,000 hours respectively. Hence, UV-8 corresponds to approximately 4 years of continuous outdoor exposure in Florida. It is important to understand which weatherometer, i.e. Carbon Arc or Xenon, was used, as well as the details of how the weatherometer was run. ASTM D-2565 is the recognized standard. Testing can be performed using actual outdoor weathering exposure, such as Florida and Arizona, to confirm this data. Note Figure 1 uses the industry standard criteria of when the sample has reached less than 50% of its original break elongation to determine the end of the test. In most cases useful life of the part extends beyond this point. All samples in Figure 1 are nonpigmented as supplied by Exxon Chemical. The UV performance test data can be found on our data sheets for each specific grade. Light Stability Characteristics Ultraviolet (UV) Stabilization Plastics are attacked and deteriorate when exposed to direct sunlight. When plastic tanks absorb the sun's ultraviolet light, the UV energy excites the polymers’chains, causing them to break. The effects are discoloration, embrittlement and eventual cracking. Elevated temperatures and oxygen tend to accelerate the deterioration. Tanks listed as suitable for outdoor service are protected from UV attack by: coloring or pigmenting and/or adding internal stabilizers which preferentially absorb or dissipate the UV energy. Shading tanks from the sun will also prevent deterioration. Tanks must be free to expand or contract, avoid excessive tension on the tank. For assistance in selecting the appropriate tank for a specific application, see the Tank Resin Selector Guides with reputable resin manufacturers. Resources being published by siting additional references to AVENGENERAL ISOLINES OF GLOBAL RADIATION AND THERE EFFECTS ON POLYMERS Years = 70 x UV Rating (Your Location's Isoline) (from Figure 3) Example: Natural Part, Molded Properly, Using UV-8 Additive Package For Use in Florida i.e.Florida= 140 Kcal/cm@2/yr. (from Figure 3) Thus Years “Expected”= 70/140 x 8 = 4 Years (until 50% of original break elongation properties left.

Think of protecting your fiberglass investments from UV, much the same way you would protect your children with sun screen; gelcoats are sunscreens for your tanks, vessels and other fiberglass constructs.

=== Design standards ===
Fiberglass Tanks fall under regulation of several groups.

- BS4994-87 is the British Standards Standard for FRP Tanks and Vessels superseded by EN 13121.
- EN 13121
- ASME RTP-1 (Reinforced Thermoset Plastic Corrosion Resistant Equipment) is the standard for FRP tanks and vessels held within the United States under 15 psig and located partially or fully above ground.

 Typical design parameters and specifications will require either compliance with ASME RTP-1 or accreditation from ASME.

- ASTM 3299 which is only a product specification, governs the filament winding process for tanks. It is not a design standard.
- SS245:1995 Singapore Standard for Sectional GRP Water Storage Tanks.

==== BS4994 ====
It is to avoid the uncertainty associated with specifying the thickness alone, that BS4994 introduced the concept of "unit properties". It is property per unit width, per unit mass of reinforcement. For example, UNIT STRENGTH is defined as load in Newton per millimeter (of laminate width) for a layer consisting of 1 kg of glass per square meter. i.e. the unit is N/mm per Kg/m2 glass

==== ASME RTP-1 ====
In RTP-1 specifications, the primary concerns relate stress and strain, such as hoop stress, axial stress, and breaking stress to the physical properties of the material, such as Young's modulus (which may require an anisotropic analysis due to the filament winding process). These are related to the loads of the design, such as the internal pressure and strain.

==== BS EN 13121 ====
This European standard replaces BS4994-87 which is marked now as Current, Obsolescent, Superseded.

==== SS245:1995 ====
This is the Singapore Standard for sectional GRP water tank, which is current.

== See also ==
- BS EN 13121-3
- BS 4994
