= BS 4994 =

BS 4994 (formally: British Standard 4994:1987) is the "specification for the design and construction of vessels and storage tanks in reinforced plastics". It specifies a code of practice for use by manufacturers of such containers. With the publication of BS EN 13121-3, BS 4994:1987 Specification for design and construction of vessels and tanks in reinforced plastics is declared obsolescent, which will still cover those tanks still in service as tanks made from GRP are generally accepted to have a long working life.

Dual laminate construction, simple FRP with glass mats, or a combination of unidirectional filament winding are common.

DUAL LAMINATE : A thermoplastic lining material, preferably 3mm to 5mm thick sheet functions as a corrosion barrier. This thermoplastic liner is not considered to contribute mechanical strength. FRP which is constructed over this lining provides the strength requirements for materials to withstand design conditions like pressure, vacuum, hydrostatic load, etc. The choice of thermoplastic is based on the chemical corrosion requirement of the equipment. PP, PVC, PTFE, ECTFE, CPVC, PVDF are used as common thermoplastic liners.

FRP (GRP): Glass mats in the form of chopped strand mat and woven roving is most common in hand lay-up method. These mats are laid on the mold and impregnated with 'initiated' resins like polyester, epoxy, vinyl ester, bisphenol epoxy vinyl ester, etc. The choice of resin is based on the chemical corrosion requirement of the equipment.

An earlier version of the specification was BS 4994:1973.

NEW LOAD UNITS: It is to avoid the uncertainty associated with specifying the thickness alone, that BS4994 introduced the concept of "unit properties". It is property per unit width, per unit mass of reinforcement. For example, UNIT STRENGTH is defined as load in Newtons per millimeter (of laminate width) for a layer consisting of 1 kg of glass per square meter, i.e., the unit is N/mm per kg/m2 glass.

This standard still remains as most popular reference material for FRP tanks and vessels

== See also ==
- FRP tanks and vessels
