= Thermal diode =

Equipment in thermodynamics

The term "thermal diode" can refer to:

- a (possibly non-electrical) device which allows heat to flow preferentially in one direction;
- an electrical (semiconductor) diode in reference to a thermal effect or function;
- or it may describe both situations, where an electrical diode is used as a heat pump or thermoelectric cooler.

== One-way heat-flow ==
A thermal diode in this sense is a device whose thermal resistance is different for heat flow in one direction than for heat flow in the other direction. I.e., when the thermal diode's first terminal is hotter than the second, heat will flow easily from the first to the second, but when the second terminal is hotter than the first, little heat will flow from the second to the first.

Such an effect was first observed in a copper–cuprous-oxide interface by Chauncey Starr in the 1930s. Beginning in 2002, theoretical models were proposed to explain this effect. In 2006 the first microscopic solid-state thermal diodes were built. In April 2015 Italian researchers at CNR announced development of a working thermal diode, publishing results in Nature Nanotechnology.

Thermal siphons can act as a one-way heat flow. Heat pipes operating in gravity may also have this effect.

== Electrical diode thermal effect or function ==
A sensor device embedded on microprocessors used to monitor the temperature of the processor's die is also known as a "thermal diode".

This application of thermal diode is based on the property of electrical diodes to change voltage across it linearly according to temperature. As the temperature increases, diodes' forward voltage decreases. Microprocessors having high clock rate encounter high thermal loads. To monitor the temperature limits thermal diodes are used. They are usually placed in that part of the processor core where highest temperature is encountered. Voltage developed across it varies with the temperature of the diode. All modern AMD and Intel CPUs, as well as AMD and Nvidia GPUs have on-chip thermal diodes. As the sensor is located directly on the processor die, it provides most local and relevant CPU and GPU temperature readings. The silicon diodes have temperature dependency of -2mV per degree Celsius. Thus the junction temperature can be determined by passing a set current through the diode and then measuring voltage developed across it. In addition to processors, the same technology is widely used in dedicated temperature sensor IC's.

== Thermoelectric heat-pump or cooler ==
There are two types. One uses semiconductor, or less efficient metal, i.e. thermocouples, working on the principles of the Peltier-Seebeck effect. The other relies on vacuum tubes and the principles of thermionic emission.

=== Peltier devices ===
- a heat engine working backwards as a refrigerator, such as a Peltier device (diode)

== Advancements ==
As of 2009 a team at MIT is working on construction of thermal diodes that convert heat to electricity at lower temperatures than before. This can be used in construction of engines or in electricity production. The efficiency of present thermal diodes is about 18% in the temperature range of 200-300 degrees Celsius.

== See also ==
- Drinking bird
- Loop heat pipe
- Thermosiphon
