= Heat pipe =

Heat-transfer device that employs phase transition

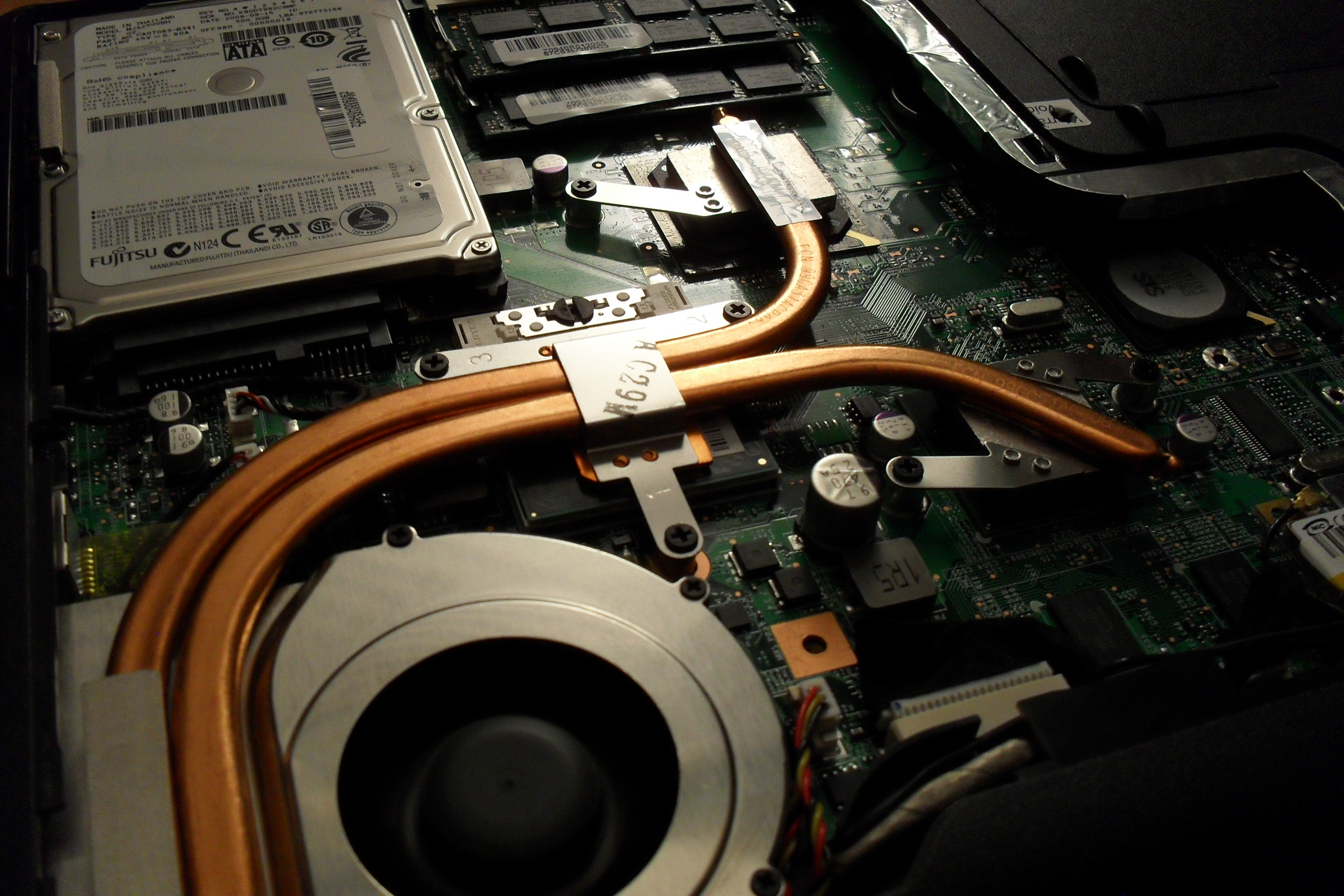
A laptop computer heat pipe system

A heat pipe is a heat-transfer device that employs phase transition to transfer heat between two solid interfaces.

At the hot interface of a heat pipe, a volatile liquid in contact with a thermally conductive solid surface turns into a vapor by absorbing heat from that surface. The vapor then travels along the heat pipe to the cold interface and condenses back into a liquid, releasing the latent heat. The liquid then returns to the hot interface through capillary action, centrifugal force, or gravity, and the cycle repeats.

Due to the very high heat-transfer coefficients for boiling and condensation, heat pipes are highly effective thermal conductors. The effective thermal conductivity varies with heat-pipe length and can approach 100 kW/(m⋅K) for long heat pipes, in comparison with approximately 0.4 kW/(m⋅K) for copper.

Modern CPU heat pipes are typically made of copper and use water as the working fluid. They are common in many consumer electronics like desktops, laptops, tablets, and high-end smartphones.

== History ==
The general principle of heat pipes using gravity, commonly classified as two-phase thermosiphons, dates back to the steam age. Angier March Perkins and his son Loftus Perkins created the Perkins Tube, which achieved widespread use in locomotive boilers and working ovens. Capillary-based heat pipes were first suggested by R. S. Gaugler of General Motors in 1942, who patented the idea, but did not develop it.

George Grover independently developed capillary-based heat pipes at Los Alamos National Laboratory in 1963; his patent of that year was the first to use the term "heat pipe", and he is often referred to as "the inventor of the heat pipe". He noted in his notebook:

Such a closed system, requiring no external pumps, may be of particular interest in space reactors in moving heat from the reactor core to a radiating system. In the absence of gravity, the forces must only be such as to overcome the capillary and the drag of the returning vapor through its channels.

Grover's suggestion was taken up by NASA, which led heat-pipe development in the 1960s, particularly regarding applications to aid reliability in space flight. This was understandable given the low weight, high heat flux, and zero power draw of heat pipes, and that they would not be adversely affected by a zero gravity environment.

The first space application was the thermal equilibration of satellite transponders. As satellites orbit, one side is exposed to the direct radiation of the sun while the opposite side is completely dark and exposed to the deep cold of outer space. This causes severe temperature discrepancies (and thus reduces reliability and accuracy) of the transponders. The heat pipe designed for this purpose managed the high heat fluxes and demonstrated flawless operation with and without the influence of gravity. That cooling system was the first to use variable-conductance heat pipes to actively regulate heat flow or evaporator temperature.

NASA tested heat pipes designed for extreme conditions, with some using liquid sodium as the working fluid. Other forms of heat pipes cool communication satellites. Publications in 1967 and 1968 by Feldman, Eastman, and Katzoff first discussed applications of heat pipes for wider uses such as in air conditioning, engine cooling, and electronics cooling. These papers were the first to mention flexible, arterial, and flat-plate heat pipes. Publications in 1969 introduced the concept of the rotational heat pipe with its applications to turbine-blade cooling and contained the first discussions of heat-pipe applications to cryogenic processes.

Starting in the 1980s, Sony began incorporating heat pipes into its commercial electronic products in place of both forced-convection and passive-finned heat sinks. Initially they were used in receivers and amplifiers, soon spreading to other high-heat-flux electronics applications.

During the late 1990s, increasingly high-heat-flux microcomputer CPUs spurred a threefold increase in the number of U.S. heat-pipe patent applications. As heat pipes evolved from a specialized industrial heat-transfer component to a consumer commodity, most development and production moved from the U.S. to Asia.

CPU heat pipes are typically made of copper and use water as the working fluid.

== Structure, design, and construction ==
Diagram showing components and mechanism for a heat pipe containing a wick

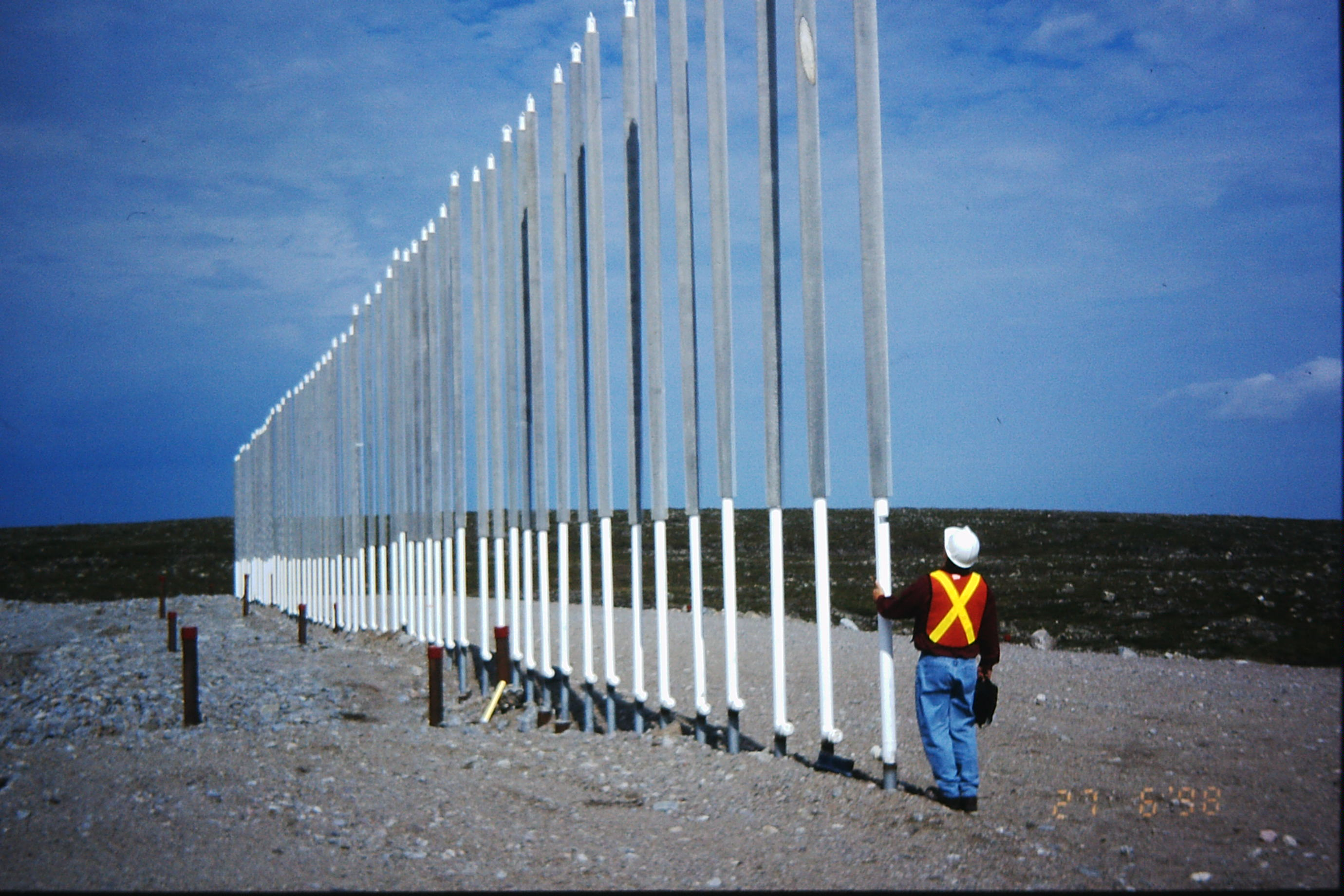
Heat pipes keep ground frozen and inhibit water transfer into the open pit during mining activities at Ekati Diamond Mine.

This 100×100×10 mm thick, flat heat pipe (heat spreader) animation was created using high-resolution CFD analysis and shows temperature-contoured flow trajectories.

This 120-mm-diameter vapor chamber (heat spreader) heat-sink-design thermal animation was created using high-resolution CFD analysis and shows temperature-contoured heat-sink surface and fluid-flow trajectories.

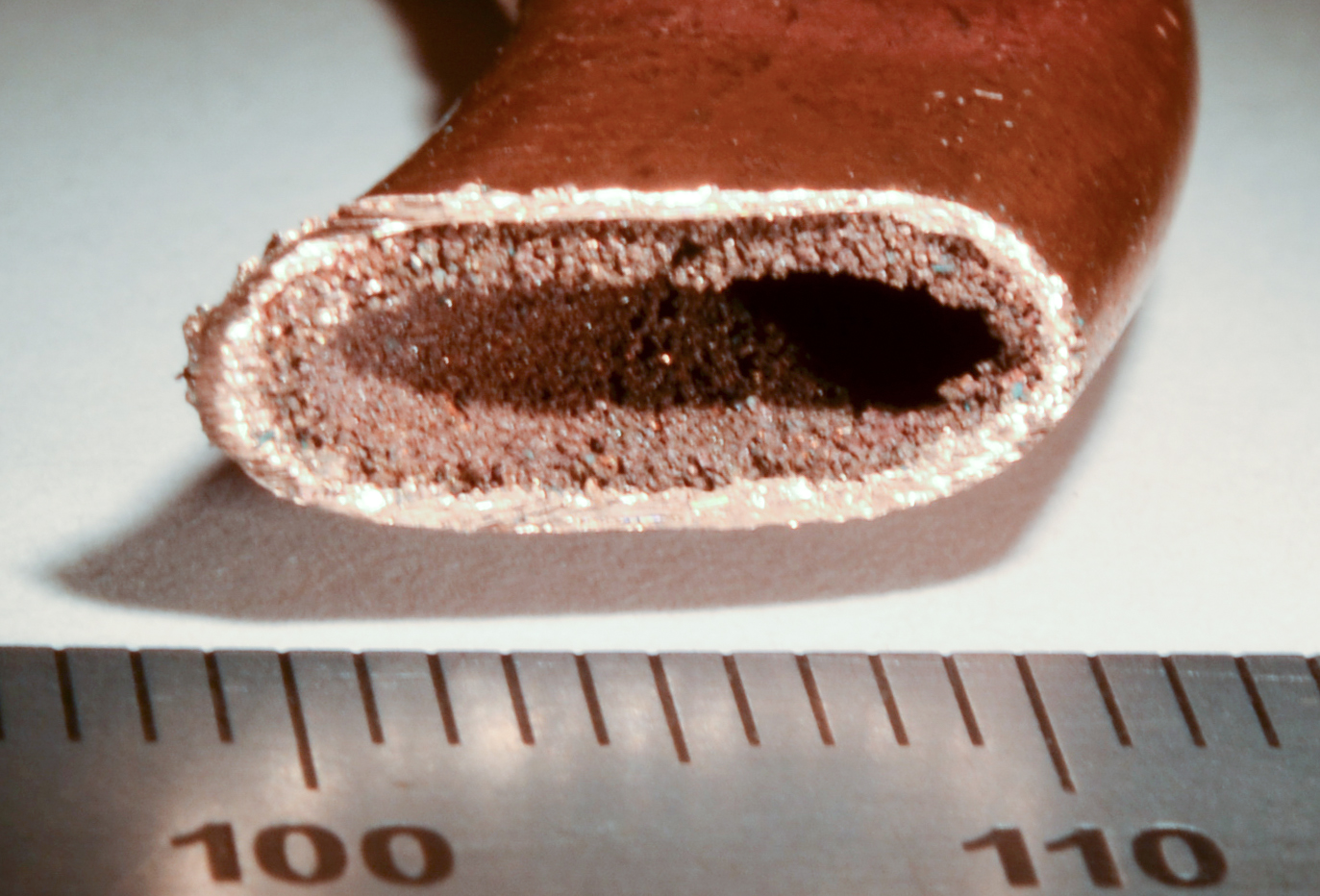
Cross section of a heat pipe for cooling the CPU of a laptop computer. Ruler scale is in millimetres.

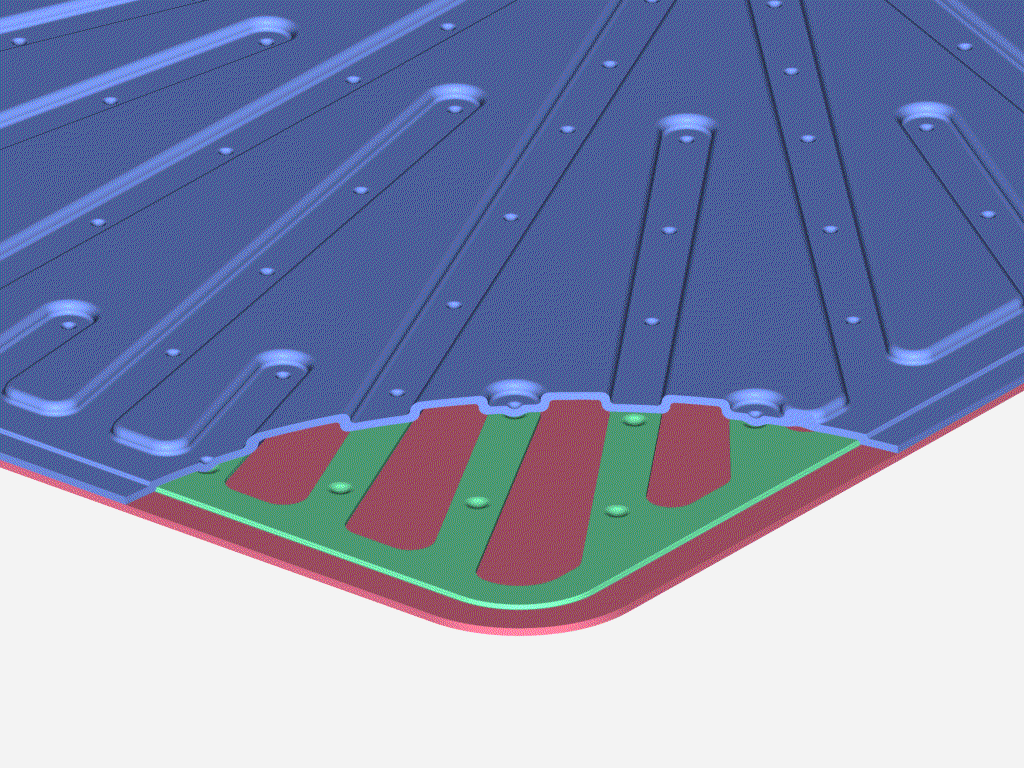
Cut-away view of a 500 μm thick, flat heat pipe with a thin planar capillary (blue)

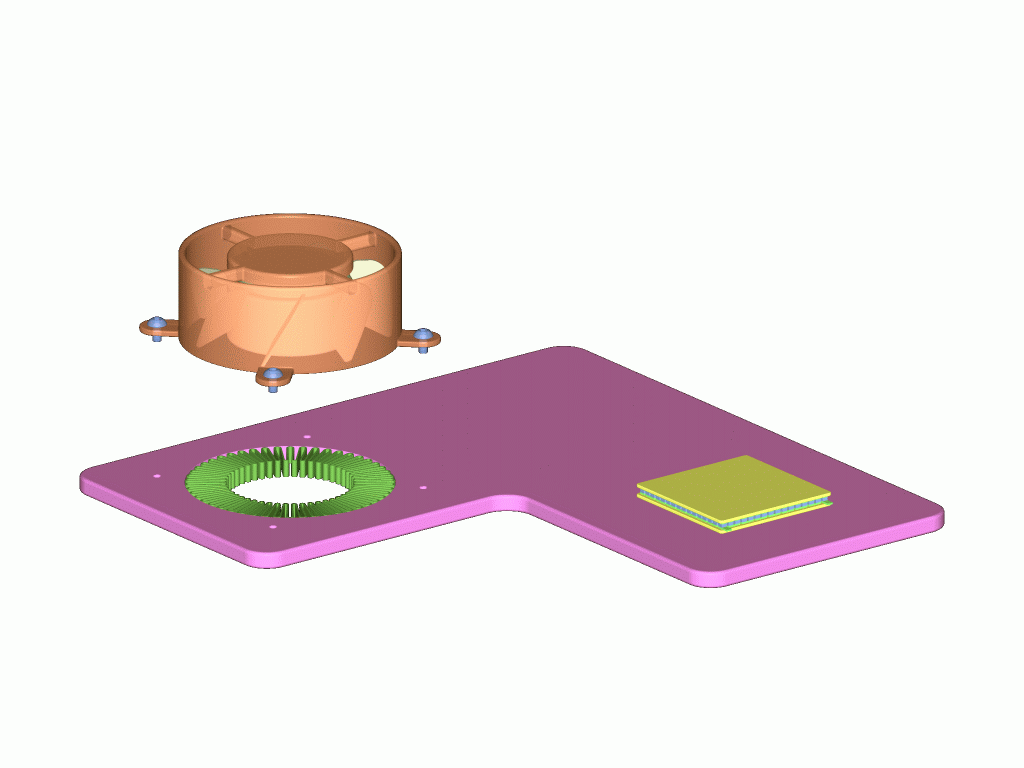
Thin, flat heat pipe (heat spreader) with remote heat sink and fan

A typical heat pipe consists of an envelope (sealed pipe), a wick, and a working fluid. The envelope is made of a material that is compatible with the working fluid such as copper for water heat pipes, or aluminum for ammonia heat pipes. Typically, a vacuum pump removes the air from the pipe, which is partially filled with a working fluid and then sealed. The working-fluid mass is chosen so that the heat pipe contains both vapor and liquid over the operating temperature range.

The operating temperature of a given heat pipe system is critically important. Below the operating temperature, the liquid is too cold and cannot vaporize into a gas. Above the operating temperature, all the liquid has turned to gas, and the environmental temperature is too high for the gas to condense. Thermal conduction is still possible through the walls, but at a greatly reduced rate of thermal transfer. In addition, for a given heat input, a minimum working-fluid temperature must be attained, while at the other end, any additional increase (deviation) in the heat-transfer coefficient from the initial design tends to inhibit the heat-pipe action. This can be counterintuitive, in the sense that if a heat-pipe system is aided by a fan, then the heat-pipe operation may potentially be severely reduced. The operating temperature and the maximum heat-transport capacity—limited by its capillary or other structure used to return the fluid to the hot area—are closely related.

Working fluids are chosen according to the required operating temperatures, with examples ranging from liquid helium for extremely low-temperature applications (2–4 K) to mercury (523–923 K), sodium (873–1473 K), and even indium (2000–3000 K) for extremely high temperatures. The vast majority of heat pipes for room-temperature applications use ammonia (213–373 K), alcohol (methanol (283–403 K), ethanol (273–403 K)), or water (298–573 K). Copper/water heat pipes have a copper envelope, use water as the working fluid, and typically operate from 20 to 150 °C (293–423 K). Water heat pipes are sometimes partially filled with water, heated until the water boils and displaces the air, and then sealed while hot.

The heat pipe must contain saturated liquid and its vapor (gas phase). The saturated liquid vaporizes and travels to the condenser, where it is cooled and condensed.

The liquid returns to the evaporator via the wick, which exerts capillary action on the liquid. Wick structures include sintered metal powder, screen, and grooved wicks, which have a series of grooves parallel to the pipe axis. When the condenser is located above the evaporator in a gravitational field, gravity can return the liquid. In this case, the pipe is a thermosiphon. Rotating heat pipes use centrifugal forces to return liquid from the condenser to the evaporator.

Heat pipes contain no moving parts and typically require no maintenance, though non-condensable gases that diffuse through the pipe's walls, that result from breakdown of the working fluid, or that exist as original impurities in the material, may eventually reduce the pipe's effectiveness.

The heat pipe's advantage over many other heat-dissipation mechanisms is its efficiency in transferring heat. A pipe one inch in diameter and two feet long can transfer 3.7 kW (13,000 BTU/h) at 1,800 °F (980 °C) with only 18 °F (10 °C) drop from end to end. Some heat pipes have demonstrated a heat flux of more than 23 kW/cm^{2}, about four times that of the Sun's surface.

Some envelope/working-fluid pairs that appear to be compatible are not. For example, water in an aluminum envelope develops significant amounts of non-condensable gas within hours or days. This issue is primarily due to the oxidation and corrosion of aluminum in the presence of water, which releases non-condensable hydrogen gas.

In an endurance test, pipes are operated for long intervals and monitored for problems such as non-condensable gas generation, material transport, and corrosion.

The most commonly used envelope/wick/fluid combinations include:

- Copper envelope / water fluid for electronics cooling. This is by far the most common type.
- Copper or steel envelope with refrigerant R134a fluid in HVAC systems.
- Aluminum envelope with ammonia fluid for spacecraft thermal control.
- Superalloy envelope with alkali metal (cesium, potassium, sodium) fluid for high-temperature applications, most commonly for calibrating primary temperature measurement devices.

Other combinations include stainless-steel envelopes with nitrogen, oxygen, neon, hydrogen, or helium working fluids at temperatures below 100 K, copper/methanol for electronics cooling when the heat pipe must operate below the water range, aluminum/ethane heat pipes for spacecraft thermal control in environments when ammonia can freeze, and refractory-metal envelope / lithium fluid for applications above 1,050 °C (1,320 K; 1,920 °F).

Heat pipes must be tuned to particular cooling conditions. The choice of pipe material, size, and coolant all affect the optimal temperature. Outside of its design heat range, thermal conductivity is reduced to the heat-conduction properties of its envelope. For copper, that is around 1/80 of the design flux. This is because below the range, the working fluid never vaporizes, and above the range, it never condenses.

Few manufacturers can make a traditional heat pipe smaller than 3 mm in diameter due to material limitations. Researchers have shown that heat pipes containing graphene can improve cooling performance in electronics.

== Types ==
In addition to standard, constant-conductance heat pipes (CCHPs), other types include:

- Vapor chambers (planar heat pipes), which are used for heat-flux transformation, and surface isothermalization;
- Variable-conductance heat pipes (VCHPs), which use a non-condensable gas (NCG) to change the heat pipe's effective thermal conductivity as power or the heat-sink conditions change;
- Pressure-controlled heat pipes (PCHPs), a type of VCHP where the reservoir volume or the NCG mass can be changed, to increase precision;
- Diode heat pipes, which have a high thermal conductivity in the forward direction, and a low thermal conductivity in the reverse direction;
- Thermosiphons, which return the liquid to the evaporator by gravitational/accelerational forces; and
- Rotating heat pipes, which return the liquid to the evaporator by centrifugal forces.

=== Vapor chamber ===
Thin planar pipes (heat spreaders or flat pipes) have the same primary components as tubular pipes. They add an internal support structure or a series of posts to the vapor chamber to accommodate clamping pressures up to 90 psi (620 kPa). This helps prevent collapse of the flat top and bottom when pressure is applied.

The two main applications for vapor chambers are when high powers and heat fluxes are applied to a relatively small evaporator. Heat input to the evaporator vaporizes liquid, which flows in two dimensions to the condenser surfaces. After the vapor condenses, capillary forces in the wick return the condensate to the evaporator. Most vapor chambers are insensitive to gravity, and operate when inverted, with the evaporator above the condenser. In this application, the vapor chamber acts as a heat-flux transformer, cooling a high heat flux from an electronic chip or laser diode, and transforming it to a lower heat flux that can be removed by natural or forced convection. With special evaporator wicks, vapor chambers can remove 2000 W over 4 cm^{2}, or 700 W over 1 cm^{2}.

Another major use of vapor chambers is for cooling laptops. As vapor chambers are flatter and more two-dimensional, gaming laptops benefit more compared to traditional pipes. For example, the vapor-chamber cooling in Lenovo's Legion 7i was a selling point (although only a few units were so equipped).

Compared to a one-dimensional tubular pipe, the width of a two-dimensional pipe allows thin devices to offer an adequate cross section for heat flow. Such pipes appear in "height-sensitive" applications, such as notebook computers and surface-mount circuit-board cores. It is possible to produce flat pipes as thin as 1.0 mm (only slightly thicker than a credit card).

=== Variable conductance ===
Standard heat pipes are constant-conductance devices, where the operating temperature is set by the source and sink temperatures, and the thermal resistance from the source to the sink. The temperature drops linearly as the power or condenser temperature is reduced. For some applications, such as satellite or research-balloon thermal control, the electronics are overcooled at low powers, or at the low-sink temperatures. Variable-conductance heat pipes (VCHPs) are used to passively maintain the temperature of the electronics being cooled as power and sink conditions change.

Variable-conductance heat pipes add two elements: a reservoir and a non-condensable gas (NCG). The non-condensable gas is typically argon, though helium is used for thermosyphons. When the heat pipe is not operating, the non-condensable gas and working-fluid vapor are mixed. When the pipe is operating, the non-condensable gas is swept toward the condenser by the flow of the working-fluid vapor. Most of the non-condensable gas is located in the reservoir, while the remainder blocks a portion of the condenser. The VCHP works by varying the active length of the condenser. When the power or heat-sink temperature is increased, the heat-pipe vapor temperature and pressure increase. The increased vapor pressure forces more of the non-condensable gas into the reservoir, increasing the active condenser length and the conductance. Conversely, when the power or heat-sink temperature is decreased, the heat-pipe vapor temperature and pressure decrease, and the non-condensable gas expands, reducing the active condenser length and conductance.

The addition of a small heater on the reservoir, with the power controlled by the evaporator temperature, allows thermal control of roughly ±1–2 °C. In one example, the evaporator temperature was maintained in a ±1.65 °C control band, as power varied from 72 to 150 W, and heat sink temperature varied from +15 °C to −65 °C.

VCHPs can be used when tighter temperature control is required. The evaporator temperature is used to either vary the reservoir volume, or the amount of non-condensable gas. VCHPs have demonstrated milli-Kelvin temperature control.

=== Diode ===
Conventional heat pipes transfer heat from the hotter to the colder end. Several designs act as a thermal diode, transferring heat in one direction, while acting as an insulator in the other:

- Thermosyphons transfer heat only from the bottom to the top, where the condensate returns by gravity. When the thermosyphon is heated at the top, no liquid is available to evaporate.
- Rotating heat pipes allow liquid to travel only by centrifugal forces from the evaporator to the condenser. No liquid is available when the condenser is heated.
- Vapor-trap diode heat pipes.
- Liquid-trap diode heat pipes.

A vapor-trap diode is fabricated in a similar fashion to a variable-conductance heat pipe, with a gas reservoir at the end of the condenser. During fabrication, the heat pipe is charged with the working fluid and a controlled amount of a non-condensable gas (NCG). During normal operation, the flow of the working-fluid vapor from the evaporator to the condenser sweeps the non-condensable gas into the reservoir, where it does not interfere with the normal heat-pipe operation. When the nominal condenser is heated, the vapor flow is from the nominal condenser to the nominal evaporator. The non-condensable gas is dragged along with the flowing vapor, completely blocking the nominal evaporator, and greatly increasing the thermal resistivity of the heat pipe. In general, there is some heat transfer to the nominal adiabatic section. Heat is then conducted through the heat-pipe walls to the evaporator. In one example, a vapor-trap diode carried 95 W in the forward direction, and only 4.3 W in the reverse direction.

A liquid trap diode has a wicked reservoir at the evaporator end of the heat pipe, with a separate wick that is not in communication with the wick in the remainder of the heat pipe. During normal operation, the evaporator and reservoir are heated. The vapor flows to the condenser, and liquid returns to the evaporator by capillary forces in the wick. The reservoir eventually dries out, since there is no method for returning liquid. When the nominal condenser is heated, liquid condenses in the evaporator and the reservoir. While the liquid can return to the nominal condenser from the nominal evaporator, the liquid in the reservoir is trapped, since the reservoir wick is not connected. Eventually, all of the liquid is trapped in the reservoir, and the heat pipe ceases operation.

=== Thermosyphons ===
Most heat pipes use a wick to return the liquid from the condenser to the evaporator, allowing the heat pipe to operate in any orientation. The liquid is sucked up back to the evaporator by capillary action, similar to the way that a sponge sucks up water when an edge is placed in contact with a pool of water. However, the maximum adverse elevation (evaporator over condenser) is relatively small, on the order of 25 cm for a typical water heat pipe.

If, however, the evaporator is located below the condenser, then the liquid can drain back by gravity instead of requiring a wick, and the distance between the two can be much longer. Such a gravity-aided heat pipe is known as a thermosyphon.

In a thermosyphon, liquid working fluid is vaporized by a heat supplied to the evaporator at the bottom of the heat pipe. The vapor travels to the condenser at the top of the heat pipe, where it condenses. The liquid then drains back to the bottom of the heat pipe by gravity, and the cycle repeats. Thermosyphons are diode heat pipes; when heat is applied to the condenser end, there is no condensate available, and hence no way to form vapor and transfer heat to the evaporator.

Thermosyphon designs include thermoprobe, thermopile, depth thermosyphon, sloped-thermosyphon foundation, flat-loop thermosyphon foundation, and hybrid flat-loop thermosyphon foundation.

While a typical terrestrial water heat pipe is less than 30 cm long, thermosyphons are often several meters long. The thermosyphons used to cool the trans-Alaska pipeline were roughly 11 to 12 m long. Even longer thermosyphons have been proposed for the extraction of geothermal energy. For example, Storch et al. fabricated a 53 mm I.D., 92 m long propane thermosyphon that carried roughly 6 kW of heat. Their scalability to large sizes also makes them relevant for solar-thermal and HVAC applications.

=== Loop ===
A loop heat pipe (LHP) is a passive two-phase transfer device. It can carry higher power over longer distances by having co-current liquid and vapor flow, in contrast to the counter-current flow in a conventional heat pipe. This allows the wick in a loop heat pipe to be required only in the evaporator and compensation chamber. Micro loop heat pipes have been employed in ground and space applications.

=== Oscillating or pulsating ===
An oscillating heat pipe (OHP), also known as a pulsating heat pipe (PHP), is only partially filled with liquid working fluid. The pipe is arranged in a serpentine pattern in which freely moving liquid and vapor segments alternate. Oscillation takes place in the working fluid; the pipe remains motionless. These have been investigated for many applications, including cooling photovoltaic panels, cooling electronic devices, heat-recovery systems, fuel-cell systems, HVAC systems, and desalination. PHPs can be combined with phase-change materials.

== Heat transfer ==
Heat pipes rely on phase change to transfer thermal energy. They cannot lower temperatures at either end below the ambient temperature—they can only equalize the temperature within the pipe.

When one end of the heat pipe is heated, the working fluid inside the pipe at that end vaporizes and increases the vapor pressure inside the cavity of the heat pipe. The latent heat of vaporization absorbed by the working fluid reduces the temperature at the hot end of the pipe.

The vapor pressure over the working fluid at the hot end is higher than at the cooler end, and this pressure difference drives a rapid mass transfer to the condensing end where the excess vapor condenses, releases its latent heat, and warms the cool end. Non-condensing gases (caused by e.g., contamination) in the vapor impede the gas flow and reduce effectiveness, particularly at low temperatures, where vapor pressures are low. The speed of molecules in a gas is approximately the speed of sound, and in the absence of noncondensing gases (i.e., if there is only a gas phase present), this is the upper limit to the velocity they can travel at. In practice, the speed of the vapor is limited by the rate of condensation at the cold end and far lower than the molecular speed. The condensation rate is close to the product of the sticking coefficient, the molecular speed, and the gas density, if the condensing surface is very cold. However, if the surface is close to the temperature of the gas, then the evaporation caused by the finite temperature of the surface largely cancels this heat flux. If the temperature difference is more than some tens of degrees, then the vaporization from the surface is typically negligible, as can be assessed from the vapor-pressure curves. In most cases, with efficient heat transport through the gas, it is challenging to maintain significant temperature differences between the gas and the condensing surface. Moreover, this temperature difference corresponds to a large effective thermal resistance by itself. The bottleneck is often less severe at the heat source, as the gas densities are higher there, corresponding to higher maximum heat fluxes.

== Temperature range ==
An interesting property of heat pipes is the temperature ranges over which they are effective. It is not the case that a water-charged heat pipe only works when the hot end reaches the boiling point (100 °C, 212 °F, at normal atmospheric pressure) and steam is transferred to the cold end. However, the boiling point of water depends on the absolute pressure inside the pipe. In an evacuated pipe, water vaporizes from its triple point (0.01 °C, 32.02 °F) to its critical point (374 °C, 705 °F), as long as the heat pipe contains both liquid and vapor. Thus a heat pipe can operate at hot-end temperatures as low as just slightly warmer than the melting point of the working fluid, although the maximum rate of heat transfer is low at temperatures below 25 °C (77 °F). Similarly, a heat pipe with water as a working fluid can work well above the atmospheric boiling point (100 °C, 212 °F). The maximum temperature for long term water heat pipes is 270 °C (518 °F), with heat pipes operating up to 300 °C (572 °F) for short-term tests.

The heat of vaporization greatly exceeds the specific heat capacity. Using water as an example, the energy needed to evaporate one gram of water is 540 times the amount of energy needed to raise the temperature of that same one gram of water by 1 °C. Almost all of that energy is rapidly transferred to the "cold" end when the fluid condenses there.

== Applications ==
=== Spacecraft ===
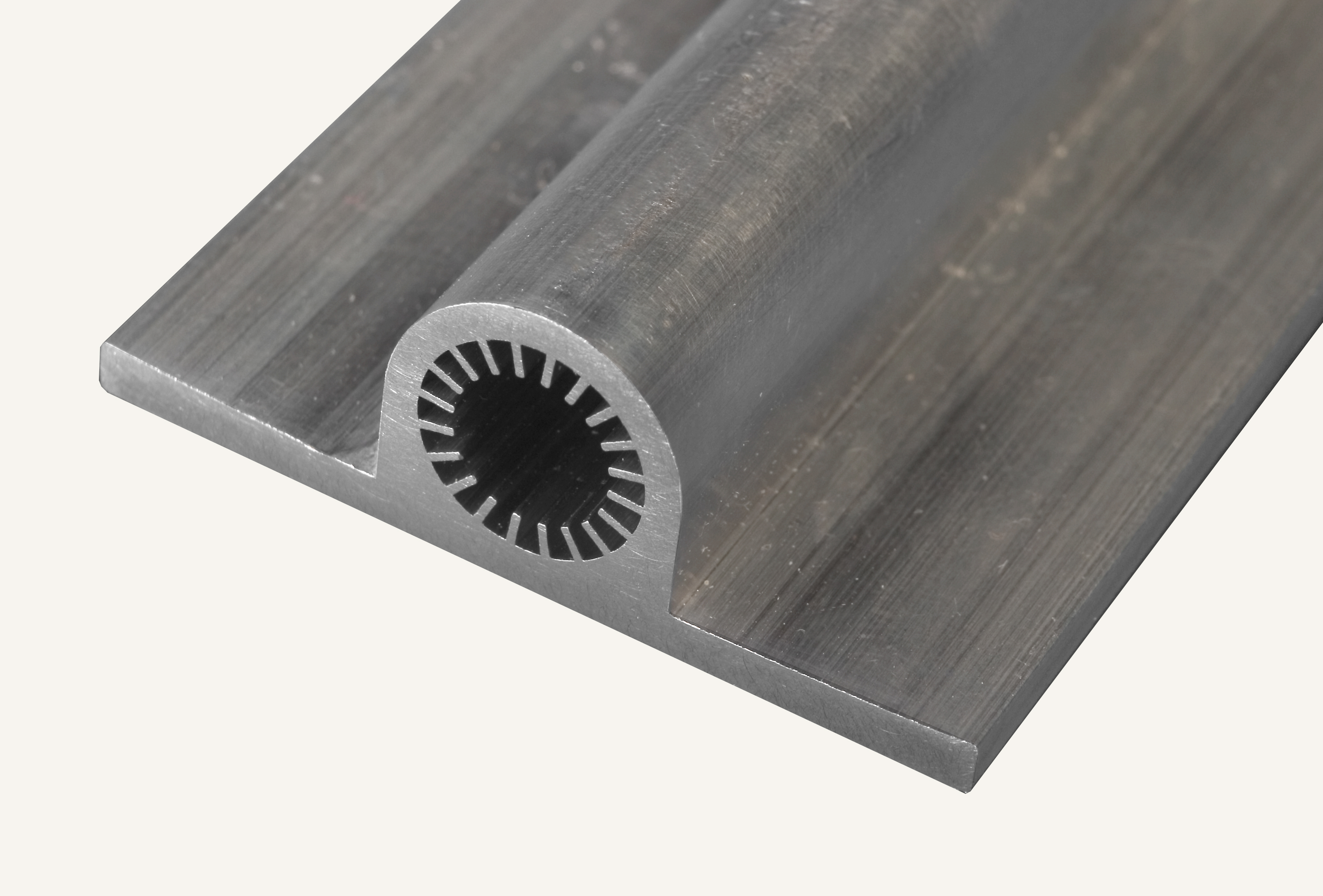
Heat pipes on spacecraft typically use a grooved aluminum extrusion as the envelope.

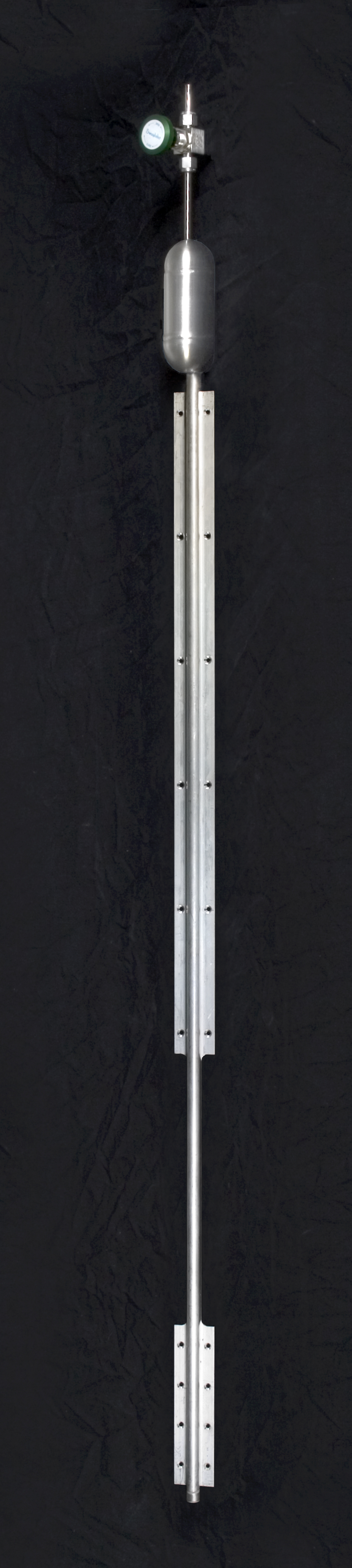
Typical grooved aluminum-ammonia VCHP for spacecraft thermal control, with the evaporator section on the bottom, and the non-condensable gas reservoir just below the valve

A spacecraft thermal control system has the function to keep all components on the spacecraft within their acceptable temperature ranges. This is complicated by the following:

- Widely varying external conditions, such as eclipses;
- Micro-g environment;
- Heat removal from the spacecraft by thermal radiation only;
- Limited electrical power available, favoring passive solutions; and
- Long lifetimes, with no possibility of maintenance.

Some spacecraft are designed to last 20 years, so passive heat transport—rejecting the heat by thermal radiation—means that large radiator panes (multiple square meters) are required. Heat pipes and loop heat pipes are used extensively in spacecraft.

Grooved wicks are used in spacecraft heat pipes, as shown in the first photograph. The heat pipes are formed by extruding aluminum, and typically have an integral flange to increase the heat transfer area, which lowers the temperature drop. Grooved wicks are used in spacecraft since the heat pipes do not have to operate against gravity. This allows spacecraft heat pipes to reach several meters long, in contrast to the roughly 25 cm maximum length for a terrestrial water heat pipe. Ammonia is the most common working fluid for spacecraft heat pipes. Ethane is used when the heat pipe must operate at temperatures below ammonia's freezing temperature.

The second figure shows a typical grooved aluminum/ammonia VCHP for spacecraft thermal control. The heat pipe is an aluminum extrusion, similar to that shown in the first figure. The bottom flanged area is the evaporator. Above the evaporator, the flange is machined off to allow the adiabatic section to be bent. The condenser is shown above the adiabatic section. The NCG reservoir is located above. The valve is removed after filling and sealing the pipe. When electric heaters are used on the reservoir, the evaporator temperature can be controlled within ±2 K of the setpoint.

=== Computer systems ===
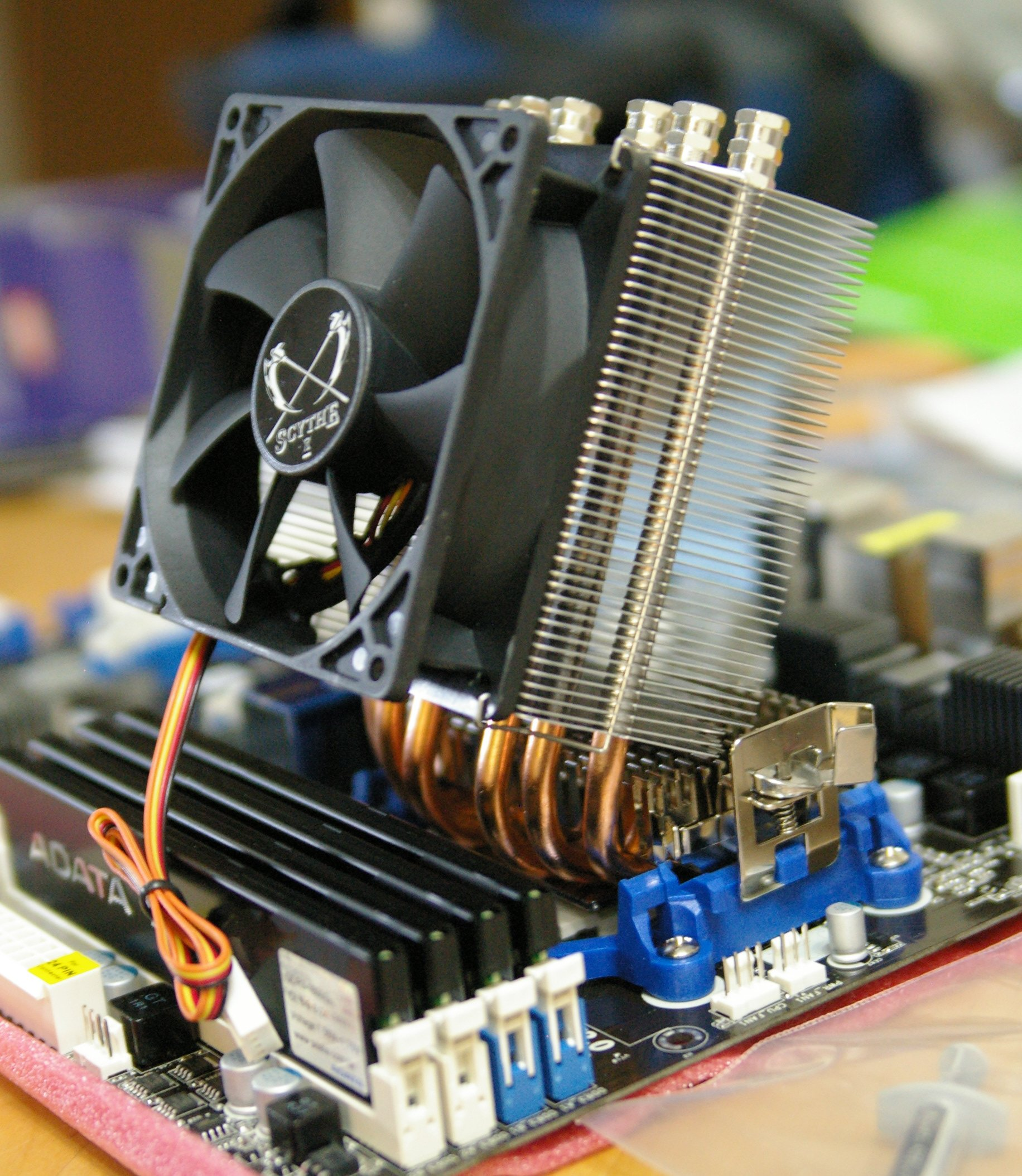
A heat sink (aluminum) with heat pipes (copper)

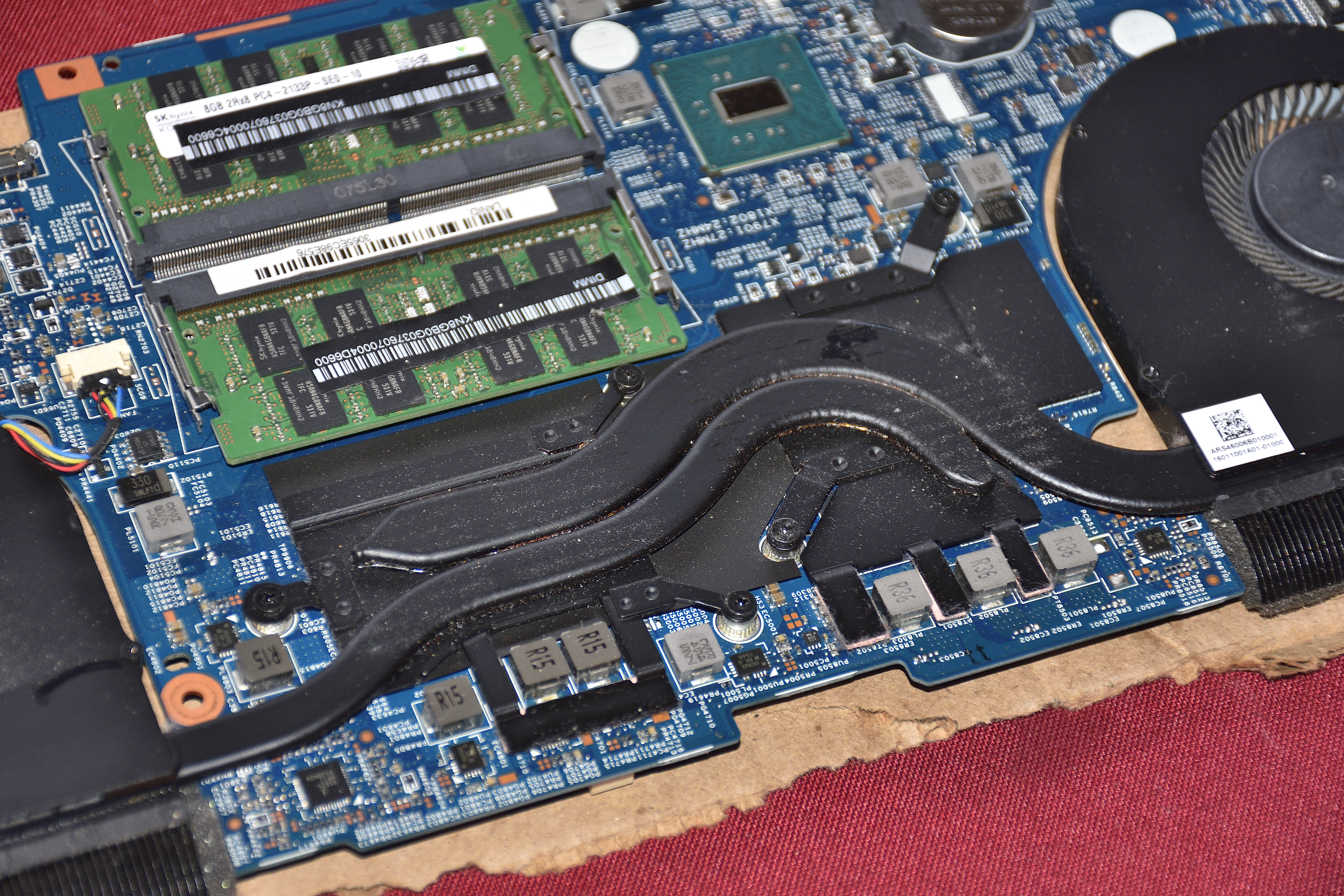
Typical heat pipe configuration within a consumer laptop. The heat pipes conduct waste heat away from the CPU, GPU, and voltage regulators, transferring it to a heat sink coupled with a cooling fan that acts as a fluid-to-fluid heat exchanger.

Heat pipes began to be used in computer systems in the late 1990s, when increased power requirements and subsequent increases in heat emission resulted in greater demands on cooling systems. They are now extensively used in many modern computer systems, typically to move heat away from components such as CPUs and GPUs to heat sinks.

=== Solar thermal ===
Heat pipes are also widely used in solar thermal water heating applications in combination with evacuated tube solar collector arrays. In these applications, distilled water is commonly used as the heat transfer fluid inside a sealed length of copper tubing that is located within an evacuated glass tube and oriented towards the Sun. In connecting pipes, the heat transport occurs in the liquid steam phase because the thermal transfer medium is converted into steam in a large section of the collecting pipeline.

In solar thermal water heating applications, an individual absorber tube of an evacuated tube collector is up to 40% more efficient compared to more traditional "flat plate" solar water collectors. This is largely because they evacuate the tube, which slows down convective and conductive heat loss. Relative efficiencies of the evacuated tube system are reduced however, when compared to flat plate collectors because the latter have a larger aperture size and can absorb more solar energy per unit area. This means that while an individual evacuated tube has better insulation (lower conductive and convective losses), an array of tubes absorbs less energy per unit area due to the reduced absorber surface area because of the rounded tubes. Therefore, real world efficiencies of both designs are about the same.

Evacuated tube collectors reduce the need for anti-freeze additives since the vacuum helps slow heat loss. However, under prolonged exposure to freezing temperatures the heat transfer fluid can still freeze and precautions must be taken to ensure that the frozen does not damage the evacuated tube. Properly designed solar thermal water heaters can be frost protected down to more than -3 °C with special additives and are used in Antarctica to heat water.

=== Permafrost cooling ===
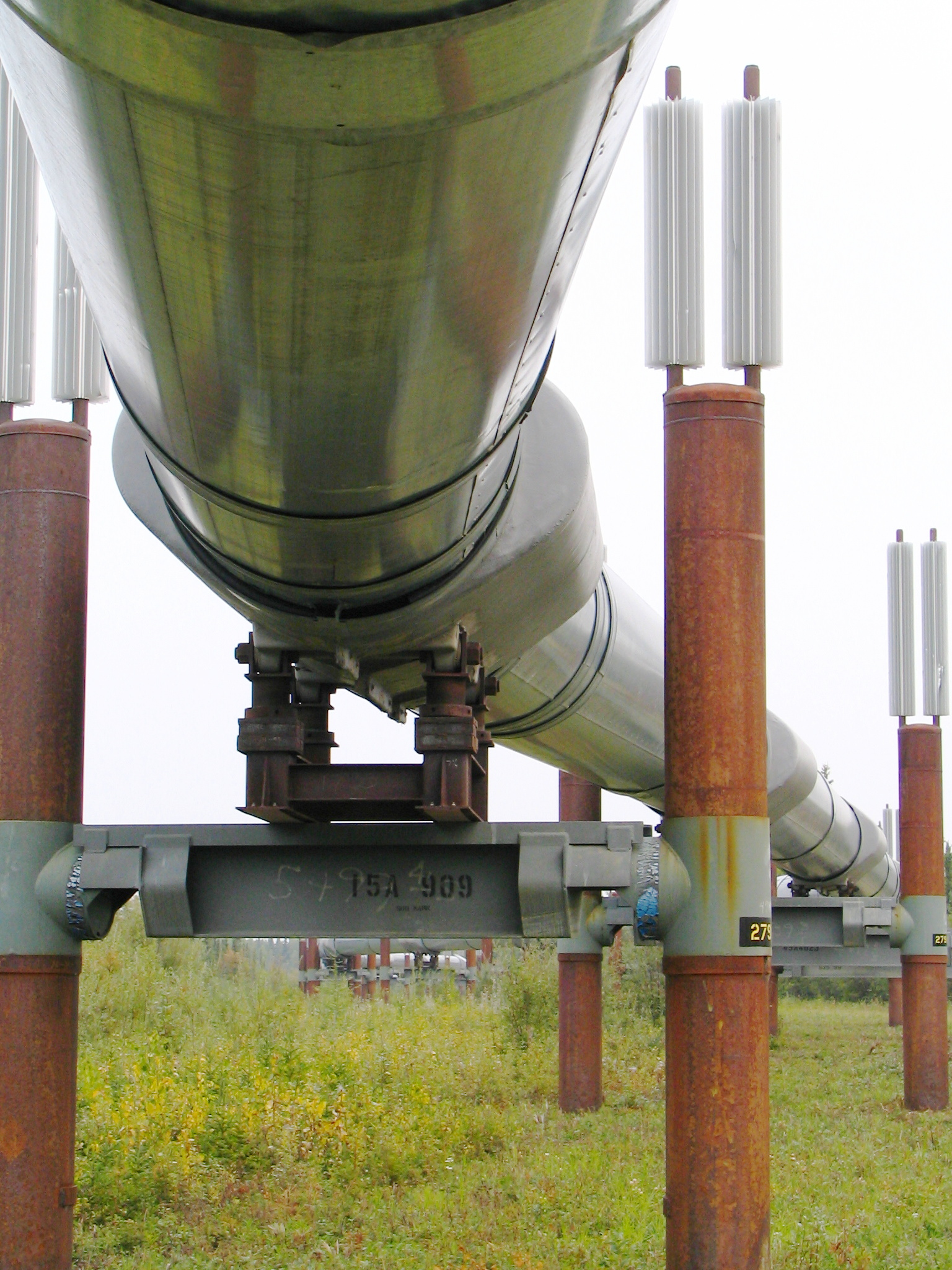
Alaska pipeline support legs cooled by heat pipe thermosyphons to keep permafrost frozen

Building on permafrost is difficult because heat from the structure can thaw the permafrost. Heat pipes are used in some cases to avoid the risk of destabilization. For example, in the Trans-Alaska Pipeline System residual ground heat remaining in the oil as well as heat produced by friction and turbulence in the moving oil could conduct down the pipe's support legs and melt the permafrost that anchors the supports. This would cause the pipeline to sink and possibly be damaged. To prevent this, each vertical support member is equipped with four thermosyphons.

During the winter, the air is colder than the ground around the supports. The liquid at the bottom of the thermosyphon is vaporized by heat absorbed from the ground, cooling the surrounding permafrost and lowering its temperature. During the summer, the thermosyphons stop operating, since no gas condenses at the top, but the extreme cold during the winter causes condensation and the liquid flows down. In the Trans-Alaska Pipeline System ammonia was initially used as the working fluid, however this was replaced with carbon dioxide due to blockages.

Thermosyphons keep the permafrost frozen alongside parts of the Qinghai–Tibet Railway where the embankment and track absorb the sun's heat. Heat pipes on either side of relevant formations prevent that heat from spreading into the surrounding permafrost.

=== Cooking ===
The first commercial heat pipe product was the "Thermal Magic Cooking Pin" developed by Energy Conversion Systems, Inc., and first sold in 1966. The cooking pans used water as the working fluid. The envelope was stainless steel, with an inner copper layer for compatibility. To roast meat, one end of the heat pipe is poked through the meat. The other end extends into the oven where it draws heat to the middle of the meat. The pin reduces cooking time for large pieces of meat by one-half.

The principle has been applied to camping stoves. The heat pipe transfers a large volume of heat at low temperature to allow goods to be baked and other dishes to be cooked in camping-type situations.

=== Ventilation heat recovery ===
In heating, ventilation, and air-conditioning (HVAC) systems, heat pipes are positioned within the supply and exhaust air streams of an air-handling system or in the exhaust gases of an industrial process, recovering heat.

The device consists of a battery of multi-row finned heat pipe tubes located within both the supply and exhaust air streams. The system recovers heat from the exhaust and transfers it to the intake.

Efficiency is greatest when the unit is positioned upright with the supply-air side mounted over the exhaust-air side, which allows the liquid refrigerant to flow quickly back to the evaporator aided by the force of gravity. Gross heat transfer efficiencies of up to 75% are claimed by manufacturers.

=== Nuclear power conversion ===
Cooling systems for nuclear power cells for spacecraft encounter extreme thermal conditions. Alkali-metal heat pipes can transfer heat from the source to a thermionic or thermoelectric converter to generate electricity.

Since the early 1990s, heat pipes for transporting heat between the reactor core and the power-conversion system have been attempted. On September 13, 2012, a joint team from NASA and the United States Department of Energy demonstrated the first heat pipe-cooled microreactor. The experiment, Demonstration Using Flattop Fissions, produced 24 W of electricity through a stirling engine fed from a small reactor via heat pipes.

=== Wankel rotary combustion engines ===
Ignition of the fuel mixture takes place in a specific part of Wankel engines, inducing thermal dilatation disparities that reduce power output, impair fuel economy, and accelerate wear. In SAE paper 2014-01-2160, "A Heat Pipe Assisted Air-Cooled Rotary Wankel Engine for Improved Durability, Power and Efficiency", the authors claimed a reduction in top engine temperature from 231 °C to 129 °C, and the temperature difference reduced from 159 °C to 18 °C for a typical small-chamber-displacement air-cooled unmanned aerial vehicle engine.

=== Heat exchangers ===
Heat exchangers transfer heat from a hot stream to a cold stream of air, water, or oil. A heat-pipe heat exchanger contains several heat pipes that each acts as a heat exchanger. This increases efficiency, lifespan, and safety. In case one pipe breaks, only a small amount of liquid is released, which is critical for certain industrial processes such as aluminum casting. Additionally, with one broken heat pipe, the heat exchanger remains operable.

The EU-funded ETEKINA project used a heat-pipe heat exchanger to recover over 40% of waste heat from various industrial factories across Europe between 2017 and 2022.

=== Potential applications ===
Research explores the use of heat pipes in various systems:

- Improving the efficiency of geothermal heating to prevent slippery roads during winter in cold climate zones.
- Increasing the efficiency of photovoltaic cells by coupling the solar panel to a heat-pipe system. This transports heat away from overheated panels to maintain optimal temperatures for maximum energy generation. Additionally, the tested setup uses the recovered energy to heat water.
- Hybrid control-rod heat pipes to shut down a nuclear reactor in case of an emergency and simultaneously transferring decay heat away to prevent the reactor from running hot.

== See also ==
- Heat sink – Passive heat exchanger that transfers heat
- Loop heat pipe – Two-phase heat transfer device
- Thermoelectric cooling – Applies an electric current to heat or cool materials
