= LHP =

LHP may refer to:

- Left-hand path, a term used in the Western esotericism
- Loop heat pipe, a two-phase heat transfer device
- Lego Harry Potter, a Lego theme based on the films of the Harry Potter series
- Lighthouse Point, Florida, a city in Broward County, Florida, United States
- Left-handed pitcher in baseball
- Lake Highland Preparatory School, a private school in Orlando, Florida
- LOHAS Park station, Hong Kong (MTR station code LHP)
