= Baker Perkins =

British engineering company

- Type: Limited company
- Industry: Food processing equipment.
- Founded: 1918
- Headquarters: Worldwide Headquarters: Paston Parkway, Peterborough, Cambridgeshire, England North American Headquarters; Kraft Ave SE, Grand Rapids, Michigan USA
- Area served: Worldwide
- Products: Bread mixing and forming equipment for plant bakeries Complete lines for biscuits, cookies and crackers Cooking and depositing lines for confectionery Traditional and extruded breakfast cereal systems Extruded and co-extruded snack lines Extruders for powder coating manufacture Extruders for continuous production of pharmaceutical powders
- Number of employees: 350
- Website: http://www.bakerperkins.com

Baker Perkins Ltd is a British engineering company for food processing equipment headquartered in Peterborough, England. It caters to the bread, biscuit, confectionery, snack, and breakfast cereal sectors.

Alongside its facilities in the United Kingdom, the company operates a location in Michigan in the United States.

Baker Perkins was founded in 1918 through the merger of Joseph Baker & Sons Ltd and Perkins Engineers Ltd, and later bought by the dairy and liquid food specialist APV which helped it grow internationally. The company regained independence in 2006 with its acquisition by private investors.

Since November 2020, Baker Perkins is part of the Schenck Process Group, an international engineering company based in Germany.

== History ==
The company was created by the inventors Jacob Perkins (1766–1849) and Joseph Baker, both immigrants from America.

Jacob Perkins

After moving from Massachusetts to England in 1819, Perkins son Angier March Perkins (1799–1881) founded the firm of A. M. Perkins & Co Ltd to manufacture the inventions of his father, such as a steam oven for baking bread. In 1893, the company merged with the London business Werner & Pfleiderer to form Werner, Pfleiderer & Perkins Ltd and later relocated their manufacturing from London to Westwood, Peterborough in 1904. Bowing to pressure over its German-sounding name, the company renamed to Perkins Engineers Ltd in 1914. During World War I, the company produced a range of armaments including Ricardo engines for Mark IV tanks.

Joseph Baker

Joseph Baker first established his business Joseph Baker & Sons in Ontario, Canada, where he invented and produced a combined flour scoop and sifter that proved to be successful among Victorian housewives. In the 1870s, Baker decided to test the market in England where he gained fast success. His decision helped the business grow as a supplier of machinery to bakery, biscuit, chocolate and confectionery industries and established it as a serious exporter and manufacturer of food machinery in the UK, directly competing with Perkins Engineers Ltd.

Baker Perkins

During World War I, both companies collaborated on automatic baking equipment for armies in the field and later merged to become Joseph Baker Sons & Perkins Ltd in 1918, before rebranding to Baker Perkins Ltd in 1923.

Around the time of the merger, Baker bought a factory in Saginaw, Michigan, which became the base for manufacture of food and chemical equipment in North America.

Between the wars, the company manufactured a wide range of machinery including laundry equipment. In 1939, Baker Perkins was asked to take on production of the new twin 6-pounder coast defence gun and also made components for a wide range of other artillery pieces. Post war, Baker Perkins specialized in equipment for the food processing and printing industries.

The business had expanded to become global in its organization and sales when in 1987 the dairy and liquid food specialist, APV, acquired it to become APV Baker. During this time the company relocated from old premises near the center of Peterborough to a new purpose-built facility on the outskirts.

21st century

In 2006 Baker Perkins was acquired by private investors. Recent products include molding and forming technology around bread baking.

The business operates in two office locations, the headquarters being in Paston, Peterborough with a second office in Grand Rapids, Michigan.

Since November 2020, Baker Perkins Ltd. is part of the Schenck Process Group, an international engineering company with headquarters in Darmstadt, Germany.

== Trade Associations ==
Baker Perkins is a member of trade associations and research organisations including AACC International, PMCA, BEMA and B&CMA in the US: and the Leatherhead Food International and Campden BRI in the UK.
