= Loftus Perkins =

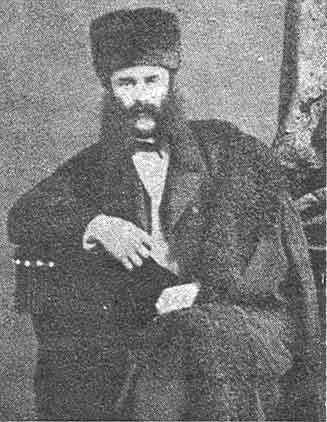
Loftus Perkins.

Loftus Perkins (8 May 1834 – 27 April 1891) was an English engineer, particularly involved in developing the practical technologies of central heating and refrigeration.

== Life ==
Perkins was born in London, the son of Angier March Perkins and was likely apprenticed to his father. His grandfather, Jacob Perkins, had arrived in England from New England and the family still had many contacts in the U.S. so, in 1853-4 Loftus worked in America. After further work for his father, and in Hamburg and Berlin before establishing the partnership of A. M. Perkins & Son with his father.

He devoted his energies to heating and refrigeration and combined great imagination with practical engineering instincts. He also contributed to the development of the steam engine. Among his innovations were:

- The "Polly Perkins" - mobile steam ovens for the British Army;
- Steam ovens for use in bakeries;
- High-pressure steam tractors;
- The Anthracite - a 70-ton yacht powered by high-pressure steam;
- Express - a 160 ft steamship powered by a Perkins 800 horse power quadruple compound engine;
- the "Arktos" cold chamber (1888) for preserving food.

== Family ==
He married Emily Patton (born 1837/8) from New York. Loftus was joined in the family business by his sons:

- Loftus Patton Perkins (born 1867); and
- Ludlow Patton Perkins (1872–1928).

Perkins died in London and was buried at Kensal Green Cemetery. The firm subsequently merged with Joseph Baker, Sons & Co., as Baker Perkins.

== Memberships ==
- Member of the Institution of Mechanical Engineers, (1861);
- Member of the Institution of Civil Engineers, (1881)

== See also ==
- Timeline of low-temperature technology

== Bibliography ==
- Obituaries:
  - The Engineer, 1 May 1891, 349

- McConnell, A. (2004) "Perkins, Loftus (1834–1891)", Oxford Dictionary of National Biography, Oxford University Press, accessed 21 August 2007 (subscription or UK public library membership required)
- Muir, A. (1968). The History of Baker Perkins. Cambridge: W. Heffer & Sons Ltd.

The Baker Perkins Historical Society
