= Jacob Perkins =

American inventor and physicist (1766–1849)

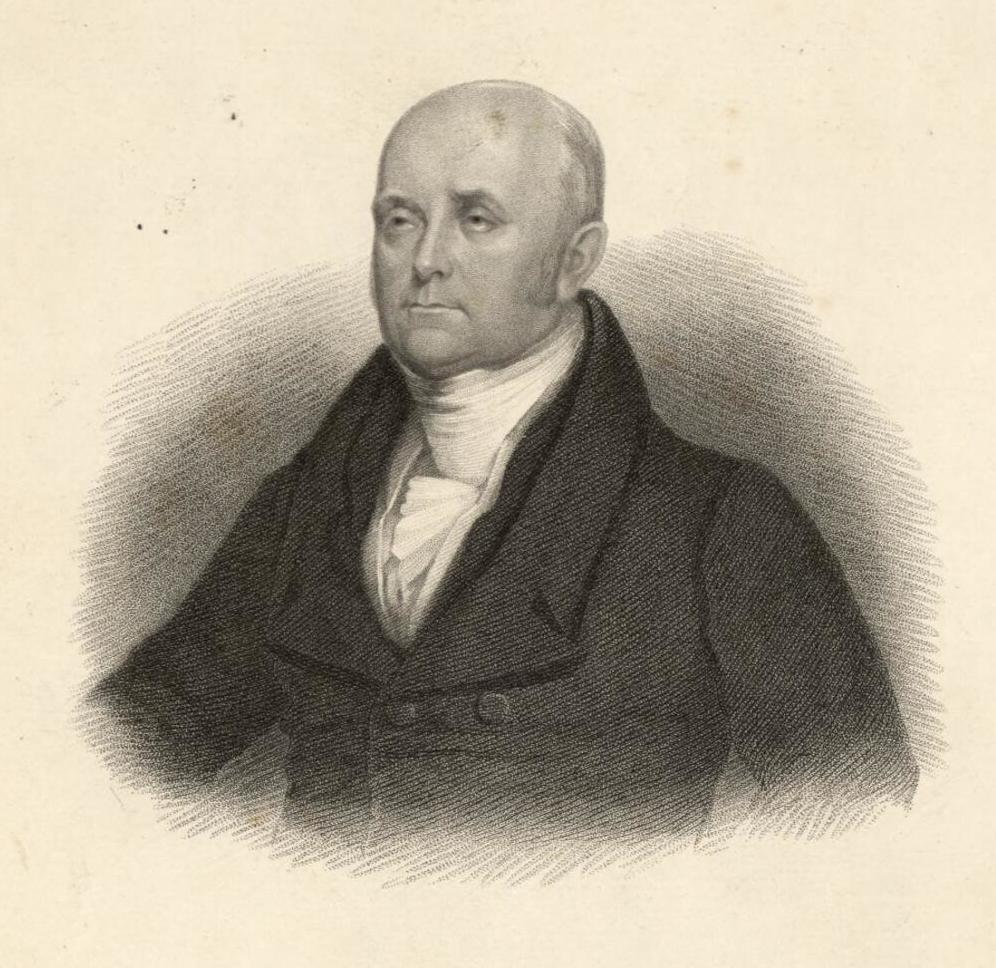
- Portrait of Perkins by Thomas Edwards (printed by Pendleton's Lithography), 1826
- Born: July 9, 1766; Newburyport, Massachusetts
- Died: July 30, 1849 (aged 83); London, England
- Occupations: Inventor, mechanical engineer, physicist

Jacob Perkins (July 9, 1766 – July 30, 1849) was an American inventor, mechanical engineer and physicist based in the United Kingdom. Born in Newburyport, Massachusetts, Perkins was apprenticed to a goldsmith. He soon made himself known with a variety of useful mechanical inventions and eventually had twenty-one American and nineteen English patents. He is sometimes known as the father of the refrigerator. He was elected a Fellow of the American Academy of Arts and Sciences in 1813 and a member of the American Philosophical Society in 1819.

== Early life ==
Jacob went to school in Newburyport until he was twelve and then was apprenticed to a goldsmith in Newburyport named Davis. Mr. Davis died three years later and the fifteen-year-old Jacob continued the business of making gold beads and added the manufacture of shoe buckles. When he was twenty-one, he was employed by the master of the Massachusetts mint to make a die for striking copper pennies bearing an eagle and an Indian.

== Innovations ==
=== Nail machines ===
In 1790, at the age of 24, in Byfield, he created machines for cutting and heading nails. In 1795, he was granted a patent for his improved nail machines and started a nail manufacturing business on the Powwow River in Amesbury, Massachusetts.

=== Cannon borings ===
During the War of 1812 he worked on machinery for boring out cannons.

=== Hydrostatics ===
He worked on water compression and invented a bathometer or piezometer, which can be used to measure the depth of the sea by its pressure.

=== Engraving ===
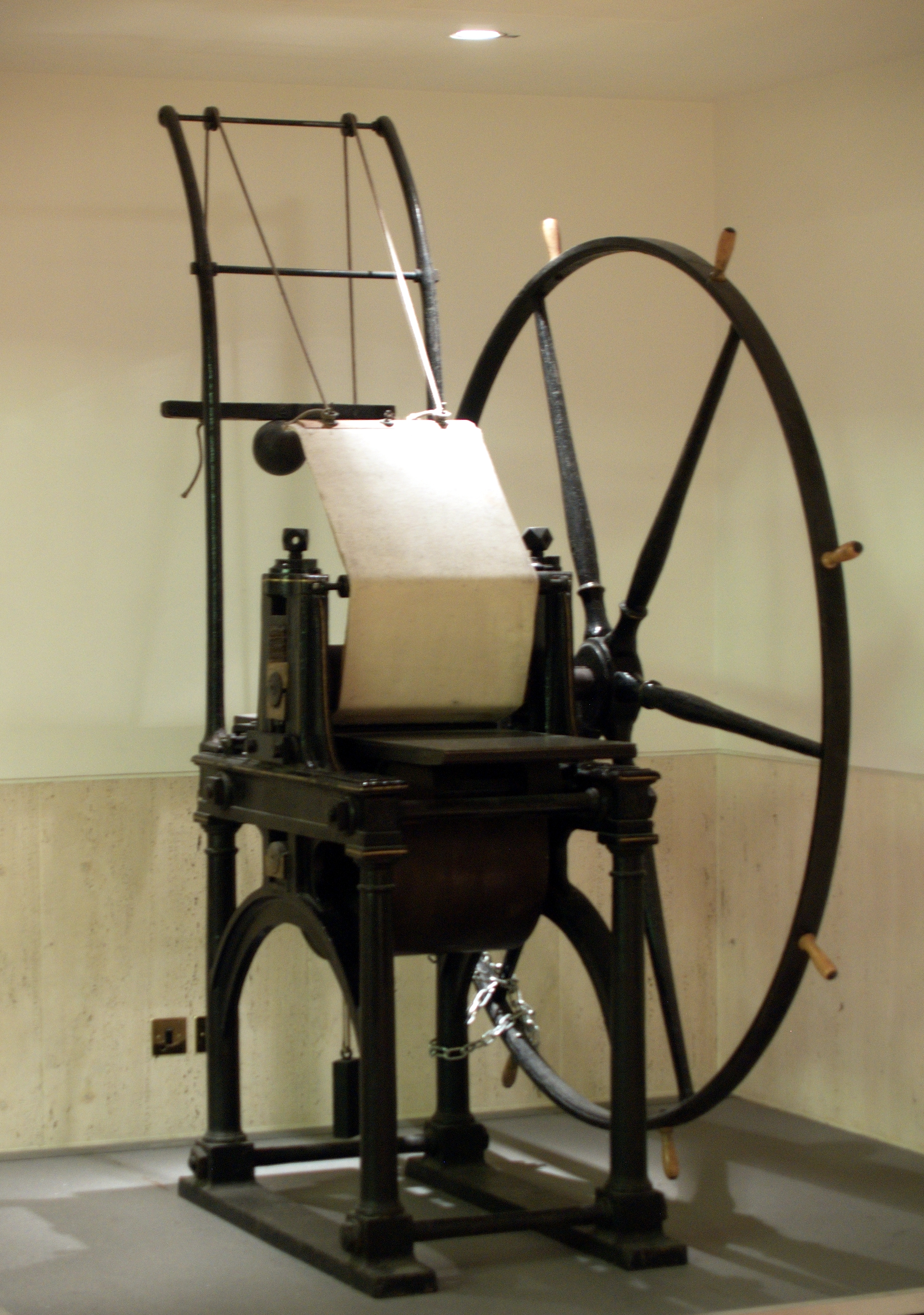
The Perkins D Cylinder Printing Press

Perkins created some of the best steel plates (as noted from English Engravers) for engraving, and started a printing business with engraver Gideon Fairman. They began with school books, and also made bank notes that were difficult to counterfeit. In 1809 he bought the stereotype technology (an aid in large-batch printing of bank notes that were difficult to counterfeit) from Asa Spencer, and registered the patent, and then employed Asa Spencer. Perkins made several important innovations in printing technology, including new steel engraving plates. Using these plates he made the first known steel engraved USA books (The Running Hand, school books, 8 pages each). He then made notes for a Boston Bank, and later for the National Bank. In 1816 he set up a printing shop and bid on the printing of currency for the Second National Bank in Philadelphia.

His quality printing of American bank notes attracted the attention of the Royal Society who were busy addressing the problem of the widespread forging of English notes. In 1819, with his printing business partner, Gideon Fairman, they employed Asa Spencer and went to England at Charles Heath's urging in an attempt to win the £20,000 reward for "unforgable notes". Sample notes were shown to the Royal Society president Sir Joseph Banks. They set up shop in England, and spent months on example banknotes, but unfortunately for them, Banks thought that the inventor should be English by birth.

Printing English notes ultimately proved a success and was carried out by Perkins in partnership with the English engraver-publisher Charles Heath and his associate Gideon Fairman. Together they formed the partnership Perkins, Fairman and Heath. Heath and Perkins also had support from their brothers. Perkins, Fairman and Heath was later renamed, when his son-in-law, Joshua Butters Bacon, bought out Charles Heath and the company was then known as Perkins, Bacon. Perkins Bacon provided banknotes for many banks, and foreign countries with postage stamps. Stamp production started for the British government in 1840 with the 1d black and the 2d blue postage stamps, which incorporated an anti-forgery measure in the form of a complicated background produced by means of the rose engine. Their stamps were the first known preglued stamps.

Also concurrently, Jacob's brother ran the American printing business, and they made money on important fire safety patents. Charles Heath and Jacob Perkins worked together and independently on some concurrent projects.

=== Hermetic tube ===
Jacob Perkins has patents for Heating and Air Conditioning technology. In 1829–30, he went into partnership with his second son Angier March Perkins, manufacturing and installing central heating systems using his hermetic tube principle. He also investigated refrigeration machinery after discovering from his research in heating that liquefied ammonia caused a cooling effect.

=== Steam power ===
In 1816, Jacob Perkins had worked on steam power with Oliver Evans in Philadelphia. In 1822 he made an experimental high pressure steam engine working at pressures up to 2,000 psi (14 MPa). This was not practical for the manufacturing technology of the time, though his concepts were revived a century later. Perkins' boiler was the first example of a flash boiler and one of the first examples of a contra-flow heat exchanger. The water-tube boiler consisted of heavy cast iron straight, square-section water-tubes across the firebox, joined by unheated pipes outside it. These tubes were arranged in three layers, with water pumped into the upper layer and steam extracted at the lower, giving that contra-flow arrangement. In 1927, Loftus P. Perkins, a descendant, lectured on these boilers and displayed a 1/8 in (3.2 mm) copper pipe, apparently from a 40 bhp (30 kW) engine of a type that was in use up until 1918.

Perkins' high-pressure steam technology was also used in another invention, the steam gun. This was an early fully automatic machine gun, powered by steam rather than by gunpowder. Although not the first automatic firearm, it was the first to also have a high magazine capacity of more than a handful of rounds. It operated with musket balls at a cyclic firing rate of 1,000 rounds per minute. It is reported to have been rejected by the Duke of Wellington as 'too destructive'.

In 1827 he became the first person in England to use a uniflow steam engine. A locomotive on the South Eastern Railway was converted to the Uniflow system in 1849, although it is not known whose idea this was.

Perkins applied his Hermetic tube system to steam locomotive boilers and a number of locomotives using this principle were made in 1836 for the London and South Western Railway. This was a very early example of a high pressure steam locomotive.

=== National Gallery of Practical Science ===
In 1832 Perkins established the National Gallery of Practical Science on Adelaide Street, West Strand, London. This was devoted to showing modern inventions. A popular feature was his steam gun, which did not find favour with the military.

=== Refrigeration ===
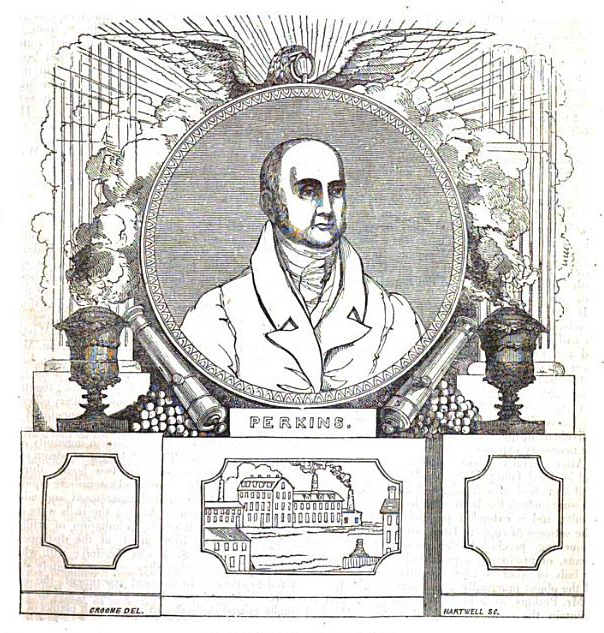
Portrait of Perkins, American Magazine of Useful and Entertaining Knowledge 1835

Perkins is credited with the first patent for the vapor-compression refrigeration cycle, assigned on August 14, 1834 and titled, "Apparatus and means for producing ice, and in cooling fluids". The idea had come from another American inventor, Oliver Evans, who conceived of the idea in 1805 but never built a refrigerator. The same patent was granted in both Scotland and England separately.

== Financial problems detailed ==
Jacob Perkins and Charles Heath had many business successes, but also had financial difficulties, but usually not at the same time. The accounting records for their printing business shows the two borrowed from the business, and sold shares back and forth when necessary in any and all business ventures, and kept detailed records. This professional relationship ended when Jacob's son-in-law, Joshua Butters Bacon, bought out Charles Heath's share of their shared printing business, which then became Perkins Bacon. At one point he became involved in lawsuits and had to close his engine factory.

== Patents ==
Jacob Perkins has many patents:

- GB 4400/1819. Machinery and implements applicable to ornamental turning and engraving, transferring engraved or other work from the surface of one to another piece of metal, and forming metallic dies and matrices; construction of plates and presses for printing bank-notes and other papers; making dies and presses for coining money, stamping medals, and for other purposes. October 11, 1819
- GB 4470/1820 Construction of fixed and portable pumps. June 3, 1820
- GB 4732/1822 Steam-engines. December 10, 1822
- GB 4792/1823. Heating, boiling, or evaporating by the steam of fluids, in pans, boilers, or other vessels. May 17, 1823
- GB 4800/1823 Steam-engines. June 5, 1823 .
- GB 4870/1823 Construction of the furnace of steam-boilers and other vessels. November 20, 1823
- GB 4952/1824 Throwing shells and other projectiles. May 15, 1824
- GB 4998/1824 Propelling vessels. August 9, 1824
- GB 5237/1825 Construction of bedsteads, sofas, and other similar articles. August 11, 1825
- GB 5477/1827 Construction of steam-engines. March 22, 1827
- GB 5806/1829 Machinery for propelling steam-vessels. July 2, 1829
- GB 6128/1831 Generating steam. July 2, 1831
- GB 6154/1831 Generating steam;– applicable to evaporating and boiling fluids for certain purposes. August 27, 1831
- GB 6275/1832 Blowing and exhausting air;– applicable to various purposes, June 9, 1832
- GB 6336/1832 Preserving copper in certain cases from the oxydation caused by heat. November 20, 1832
- GB 6662/1835 Apparatus and means for producing ice and in cooling fluids. August 14, 1835 (steamindex incorrectly states 1834)
- GB 7059/1836 Steam-engines; generating steam; evaporating and boiling fluids for certain purposes. April 12, 1836
- GB 7114/1836 Apparatus for cooking. June 13, 1836
- GB 7242/1836 Steam-engines, furnaces, and boilers ;- partly applicable to other purposes. December 3, 1836

Perkins bought some technology, and patented it himself in multiple countries, and employed the true inventors (as was the case with Asa Spencer and Oliver Evans).

== Family ==
Jacob was married on November 11, 1790, to Hannah Greenleaf of Newbury and together they had nine children. His second son, Angier March Perkins (1799–1881), also born at Newburyport, went to England in 1827, and was in partnership with his father (later taking over the business on the latter's death). His grandson, Loftus Perkins (1834–1891), most of whose life was spent in England, experimented with the application to steam engines of steam at very high pressures, constructing in 1880 a yacht, the Anthracite.

== Death ==
He retired in 1843 and died in London on July 30, 1849, at 83 years of age. He was buried in Kensal Green Cemetery, London.

== See also ==
- Timeline of low-temperature technology

== Bibliography ==
- Obituary:
  - Scientific American, September 8, 1849
- The Manufacture of Nails in Essex County by Sidney Perley pages 69–74 in Volume 2 of The Essex Antiquarian published May 1898.
- Bathe, D.; Bathe, G. (1943). Jacob Perkins: His Inventions, His Times and His Contemporaries. Philadelphia: Historical Society of Pennsylvania.
- Ferris, F. J. (2002). "The Perkins Family: A Short History about Four Generations of Engineers". Heritage Group Website for The Chartered Institution of Building Services Engineers. Archived from the original on August 21, 2007.
- McConnell, A. (2004) "Perkins, Angier March (1799–1881)", Oxford Dictionary of National Biography, Oxford University Press, accessed August 14, 2007 (subscription required)
- Morus, I. R. (1998). Frankenstein's Children: Electricity, Exhibition and Experiment in Early-Nineteenth-Century London. Princeton University Press. ISBN 0-691-05952-7.
- A.P. Woolrich (2002). "Perkins, Jacob". In A.W. Skempton (ed.). A biographical dictionary of civil engineers in Great Britain and Ireland. Vol. 1 (1500–1830). London: Thomas Telford. ISBN 0-7277-2939-X.
