= Copper in heat exchangers =

Heat exchangers are devices that transfer heat to achieve desired heating or cooling. An important design aspect of heat exchanger technology is the selection of appropriate materials to conduct and transfer heat fast and efficiently.

Copper has many desirable properties for thermally efficient and durable heat exchangers. First and foremost, copper is an excellent conductor of heat. This means that copper's high thermal conductivity allows heat to pass through it quickly. Other desirable properties of copper in heat exchangers include its corrosion resistance, biofouling resistance, maximum allowable stress and internal pressure, creep rupture strength, fatigue strength, hardness, thermal expansion, specific heat, antimicrobial properties, tensile strength, yield strength, high melting point, alloy, ease of fabrication, and ease of joining.

The combination of these properties enable copper to be specified for heat exchangers in industrial facilities, HVAC systems, vehicular coolers and radiators, and as heat sinks to cool computers, disk drives, televisions, computer monitors, and other electronic equipment. Copper is also incorporated into the bottoms of high-quality cookware because the metal conducts heat quickly and distributes it evenly.

Non-copper heat exchangers are also available. Some alternative materials include aluminum, carbon steel, stainless steel, nickel alloys, and titanium.

This article focuses on beneficial properties and common applications of copper in heat exchangers. New copper heat exchanger technologies for specific applications are also introduced.

== History ==
Heat exchangers using copper and its alloys have evolved along with heat transfer technologies over the past several hundred years. Copper condenser tubes were first used in 1769 for steam engines. Initially, the tubes were made of unalloyed copper. By 1870, Muntz metal, a 60% Cu-40% Zn brass alloy, was used for condensers in seawater cooling. Admiralty metal, a 70% Cu-30% Zn yellow brass alloy with 1% tin added to improve corrosion resistance, was introduced in 1890 for seawater service. By the 1920s, a 70% Cu-30% Ni alloy was developed for naval condensers. Soon afterwards, a 2% manganese and 2% iron copper alloy was introduced for better erosion resistance. A 90% Cu-10% Ni alloy first became available in the 1950s, initially for seawater piping. This alloy is now the most widely used copper-nickel alloy in marine heat exchangers.

Today, steam, evaporator, and condenser coils are made from copper and copper alloys. These heat exchangers are used in air conditioning and refrigeration systems, industrial and central heating and cooling systems, radiators, hot water tanks, and under-floor heating systems.

Copper-based heat exchangers can be manufactured with copper tube/aluminum fin, cupro-nickel, or all-copper constructions. Various coatings can be applied to enhance corrosion resistance of the tubes and fins.

== Beneficial properties of copper heat exchangers ==
=== Thermal conductivity ===
Thermal conductivity (k, also denoted as λ or κ) is a measure of a material's ability to conduct heat. Heat transfer across materials of high thermal conductivity occurs at a higher rate than across materials of low thermal conductivity. In the International System of Units (SI), thermal conductivity is measured in watts per meter Kelvin (W/(m•K)). In the Imperial System of Measurement (British Imperial, or Imperial units), thermal conductivity is measured in Btu/(hr•ft⋅F).

Copper has a thermal conductivity of 231 Btu/(hr-ft-F). This is higher than all other metals except silver, a precious metal. Copper has a 60% better thermal conductivity rating than aluminum and has almost 30 times more thermal conductivity than stainless steel.

Thermal conductivity of some common metals
| Metal | Thermal conductivity | |
| Metal | (Btu/(hr-ft-F)) | (W/(m•K)) |
|---|---|---|
| Silver | 247.87 | 429 |
| Copper | 231 | 399 |
| Gold | 183 | 316 |
| Aluminium | 136 | 235 |
| Yellow brass | 69.33 | 120 |
| Cast iron | 46.33 | 80.1 |
| Stainless steel | 8.1 | 14.0 |

Further information about the thermal conductivity of selected metals is available.

=== Corrosion resistance ===
Corrosion resistance is essential in heat transfer applications where fluids are involved, such as in hot water tanks, radiators, etc. The only affordable material that has similar corrosion resistance to copper is stainless steel. However, the thermal conductivity of stainless steel is 1/30th times than that of copper. Aluminum tubes are not suitable for potable or untreated water applications because it corrodes at pH<7.0 and so it releases hydrogen gas.

Protective films can be applied to the inner surface of copper alloy tubes to increase corrosion resistance. For certain applications, the film is composed of iron. In power plant condensers, duplex tubes consisting of an inner titanium layer with outer copper-nickel alloys are employed. This enables the use of copper’s beneficial mechanical and chemical properties (e.g., stress corrosion cracking, ammonia attack) along with titanium’s excellent corrosion resistance. A duplex tube with inner aluminium brass or copper-nickel and outer stainless or mild steel can be used for cooling in the oil refining and petrochemical industries.

=== Biofouling resistance ===
Copper and copper-nickel alloys have a high natural resistance to biofouling relative to alternative materials. Other metals used in heat exchangers, such as steel, titanium and aluminum, foul readily. Protection against biofouling, particularly in marine structures, can be accomplished over long periods of time with copper metals.

Copper-nickel alloys have been proven over many years in sea water pipework and other marine applications. These alloys resist biofouling in open seas where they do not allow microbial slime to build up and support macrofouling.

Researchers attribute copper's resistance to biofouling, even in temperate waters, to two possible mechanisms: 1) a retarding sequence of colonization through slow release of copper ions during the corrosion process, thereby inhibiting the attachment of microbial layers to marine surfaces; and/or, 2) separating layers that contain corrosive products and the larvae of macro-encrusting organisms. The latter mechanism deters the settlement of pelagic larval stages on the metal surface, rather than killing the organisms.

=== Antimicrobial properties ===
Due to copper’s strong antimicrobial properties, copper fins can inhibit bacterial, fungal and viral growths that commonly build up in air conditioning systems. Hence, the surfaces of copper-based heat exchangers are cleaner for longer periods of time than heat exchangers made from other metals. This benefit offers a greatly expanded heat exchanger service life and contributes to improved air quality. Heat exchangers fabricated separately from antimicrobial copper and aluminum in a full-scale HVAC system have been evaluated for their ability to limit microbial growth under conditions of normal flow rates using single-pass outside air. Commonly used aluminum components developed stable biofilms of bacteria and fungi within four weeks of operation. During the same time period, antimicrobial copper was able to limit bacterial loads associated with the copper heat exchanger fins by 99.99% and fungal loads by 99.74%.

Copper fin air conditioners have been deployed on buses in Shanghai to rapidly and completely kill bacteria, viruses and fungi that were previously thriving on non-copper fins and permitted to circulate around the systems. The decision to replace aluminum with copper followed antimicrobial tests by the Shanghai Municipal Center for Disease Control and Prevention (SCDC) from 2010 to 2012. The study found that microbial levels on copper fin surfaces were significantly lower than on aluminum, thereby helping to protect the health of bus passengers.

Further information about the benefits of antimicrobial copper in HVAC systems is available.

=== Ease of inner grooving ===
Internally grooved copper tube of smaller diameters is more thermally efficient, materially efficient, and easier to bend and flare and otherwise work with. It is generally easier to make inner grooved tubes out of copper, a very soft metal.

== Common applications for copper heat exchangers ==
=== Industrial facilities and power plants ===
Copper alloys are extensively used as heat exchanger tubing in fossil and nuclear steam generating electric power plants, chemical and petrochemical plants, marine services, and desalination plants.

The largest use of copper alloy heat exchanger tubing on a per unit basis is in utility power plants. These plants contain surface condensers, heaters, and coolers, all of which contain copper tubing. The main surface condenser that accepts turbine-steam discharges uses the most copper.

Copper nickel is the group of alloys that are commonly specified in heat exchanger or condenser tubes in evaporators of desalination plants, process industry plants, air cooling zones of thermal power plants, high-pressure feed water heaters, and sea water piping in ships. The composition of the alloys can vary from 90% Cu–10% Ni to 70% Cu–30% Ni.

Condenser and heat exchanger tubing of arsenical admiralty brass (Cu-Zn-Sn-As) once dominated the industrial facility market. Aluminum brass later rose in popularity because of its enhanced corrosion resistance. Today, aluminum-brass, 90%Cu-10%Ni, and other copper alloys are widely used in tubular heat exchangers and piping systems in seawater, brackish water and fresh water. Aluminum-brass, 90% Cu-10% Ni and 70% Cu-30% Ni alloys show good corrosion resistance in hot de-aerated seawater and in brines in multi-stage flash desalination plants.

Fixed tube liquid-cooled heat exchangers especially suitable for marine and harsh applications can be assembled with brass shells, copper tubes, brass baffles, and forged brass integral end hubs.

Copper alloy tubes can be supplied either with a bright metallic surface (CuNiO) or with a thin, firmly attached oxide layer (aluminum brass). These finish types allow for the formation of a protective layer. The protective oxide surface is best achieved when the system is operated for several weeks with clean, oxygen containing cooling water. While the protective layer forms, supportive measures can be carried out to enhance the process, such as the addition of iron sulfate or intermittent tube cleaning. The protective film that forms on Cu-Ni alloys in aerated seawater becomes mature in about three months at 60 °F and becomes increasingly protective with time. The film is resistant to polluted waters, irregular velocities, and other harsh conditions. Further details are available.

The biofouling resistance of Cu-Ni alloys enables heat exchange units to operate for several months between mechanical cleanings. Cleanings are nevertheless needed to restore original heat transfer capabilities. Chlorine injection can extend the mechanical cleaning intervals to a year or more without detrimental effects on the Cu-Ni alloys.

Further information about copper alloy heat exchangers for industrial facilities is available.

=== Solar thermal water systems ===
Solar water heaters can be a cost-effective way to generate hot water for homes in many regions of the world. Copper heat exchangers are important in solar thermal heating and cooling systems because of copper's high thermal conductivity, resistance to atmospheric and water corrosion, sealing and joining by soldering, and mechanical strength. Copper is used both in receivers and in primary circuits (pipes and heat exchangers for water tanks) of solar thermal water systems.

Various types of solar collectors for residential applications are available with either direct circulation (i.e., heats water and brings it directly to the home for use) or indirect circulation (i.e., pumps a heat transfer fluid through a heat exchanger, which then heats water that flows into the home) systems. In an evacuated tube solar hot water heater with an indirect circulation system, the evacuated tubes contain a glass outer tube and metal absorber tube attached to a fin. Solar thermal energy is absorbed within the evacuated tubes and is converted into usable concentrated heat. Evacuated glass tubes have a double layer. Inside the glass tube is the copper heat pipe. It is a sealed hollow copper tube that contains a small amount of thermal transfer fluid (water or glycol mixture) which under low pressure boils at a very low temperature. The copper heat pipe transfers thermal energy from within the solar tube into a copper header. As the solution circulates through the copper header, the temperature rises.

Other components in solar thermal water systems that contain copper include solar heat exchanger tanks and solar pumping stations, along with pumps and controllers.

=== HVAC systems ===
Air conditioning and heating in buildings and motor vehicles are two of the largest applications for heat exchangers. While copper tube is used in most air conditioning and refrigeration systems, typical air conditioning units currently use aluminum fins. These systems can harbor bacteria and mold and develop odors and fouling that can make them function poorly. Stringent new requirements including demands for increased operating efficiencies and the reduction or elimination of harmful emissions are enhancing copper's role in modern HVAC systems.

Copper’s antimicrobial properties can enhance the performance of HVAC systems and associated indoor air quality. After extensive testing, copper became a registered material in the U.S. for protecting heating and air conditioning equipment surfaces against bacteria, mold, and mildew. Furthermore, testing funded by the U.S. Department of Defense is demonstrating that all-copper air conditioners suppress the growth of bacteria, mold and mildew that cause odors and reduce system energy efficiency. Units made with aluminum have not been demonstrating this benefit.

Copper can cause a galvanic reaction in the presence of other alloys, leading to corrosion.

=== Gas water heaters ===
Water heating is the second largest energy use in the home. Gas-water heat exchangers that transfer heat from gaseous fuels to water between 3 and 300 kilowatts thermal (kWth) have widespread residential and commercial use in water heating and heating boiler appliance applications.

Demand is increasing for energy-efficient compact water heating systems. Tankless gas water heaters produce hot water when needed. Copper heat exchangers are the preferred material in these units because of their high thermal conductivity and ease of fabrication. To protect these units in acidic environments, durable coatings or other surface treatments are available. Acid-resistant coatings are capable of withstanding temperatures of 1000 °C.

=== Forced air heating and cooling ===
Air-source heat pumps have been used for residential and commercial heating and cooling for many years. These units rely on air-to-air heat exchange through evaporator units similar to those used for air conditioners. Finned water to air heat exchangers are most commonly used for forced air heating and cooling systems, such as with indoor and outdoor wood furnaces, boilers, and stoves. They can also be suitable for liquid cooling applications. Copper is specified in supply and return manifolds and in tube coils.

=== Direct Exchange (DX) Geothermal Heating/Cooling ===
Geothermal heat pump technology, variously known as "ground source," "earth-coupled," or "direct exchange," relies on circulating a refrigerant through buried copper tubing for heat exchange. These units, which are considerably more efficient than their air-source counterparts, rely on the constancy of ground temperatures below the frost zone for heat transfer. The most efficient ground source heat pumps use ACR, Type L or special-size copper tubing buried into the ground to transfer heat to or from the conditioned space. Flexible copper tube (typically 1/4-inch to 5/8-inch) can be buried in deep vertical holes, horizontally in a relatively shallow grid pattern, in a vertical fence-like arrangement in medium-depth trenches, or as custom configurations. Further information is available.

=== Electronic systems ===
Copper and aluminum are used as heat sinks and heat pipes in electronic cooling applications. A heat sink is a passive component that cools semiconductor and optoelectronic devices by dissipating heat into the surrounding air. Heat sinks have temperatures higher than their surrounding environments so that heat can be transferred into the air by convection, radiation, and conduction.

Aluminum is the most prominently used heat sink material because of its lower cost. Copper heat sinks are a necessity when higher levels of thermal conductivity are needed. An alternative to all-copper or all-aluminum heat sinks is the joining of aluminum fins to a copper base.

Copper heat sinks are die-cast and bound together in plates. They spread heat quickly from the heat source to copper or aluminum fins and into the surrounding air.

Heat pipes are used to move heat away from central processing units (CPUs) and graphics processing units (GPUs) and towards heat sinks, where thermal energy is dissipated into the environment. Copper and aluminum heat pipes are used extensively in modern computer systems where increased power requirements and associated heat emissions result in greater demands on cooling systems.

A heat pipe typically consists of a sealed pipe or tube at both the hot and cold ends. Heat pipes utilize evaporative cooling to transfer thermal energy from one point to another by the evaporation and condensation of a working fluid or coolant. They are fundamentally better at heat conduction over larger distances than heat sinks because their effective thermal conductivity is several orders of magnitude greater than that of the equivalent solid conductor.

When it is desirable to maintain junction temperatures below 125–150 °C, copper/water heat pipes are typically used. Copper/methanol heat pipes are used if the application requires heat pipe operations below 0 °C.

== New technologies ==
=== Internally Grooved ===
The benefits of smaller-diameter internally grooved copper tube for heat transfer are well documented.

Smaller diameter coils have better rates of heat transfer than conventional sized coils so that they can withstand higher pressures required by the new generation of environmentally friendlier refrigerants. Smaller diameter coils also have lower material costs because they require less refrigerant, fin, and coil materials; and they enable the design of smaller and lighter high-efficiency air conditioners and refrigerators because the evaporators and condensers coils are smaller and lighter. MicroGroove uses a grooved inner surface of the tube to increase the surface to volume ratio and increase turbulence to mix the refrigerant and homogenize temperatures across the tube.

=== 3D Printing ===
A new technology to make heat exchangers is 3D Printing. With 3D printing, you can create complex forms and inside channels. This results in high performance of heat exchangers. The heat exchanger printed is mainly for the industry. The heat exchangers can be printed in pure copper, CuCrZr, and CuNi2SiCr alloy.
