= Bathometer =

Tool for measuring water depth

A bathometer (also bathymeter) is an instrument for measuring water depth. It was previously used mainly in oceanographical studies, but is rarely employed nowadays. The term originates from Greek βαθύς (bathys), "deep" and μέτρον (métron), "measure".

== History ==
The earliest idea for a bathometer is due to Leon Battista Alberti (1404–1472) who sank a hollow sphere attached to some ballast with a hook. When the ball reached the bottom it detached from the ballast and resurfaced. The depth was determined (rather inaccurately) by the time it took to surface. Jacob Perkins (1766–1849) proposed a bathometer based on the compressibility of water. In this instrument the movement of a piston compressing a body of water enclosed in its cylinder is dependent on the pressure of the water outside the cylinder, and hence its depth. The amount the piston moved can be measured when it is returned to the surface.

A bathometer that did not need to be submerged was invented in 1876 by William Siemens, stimulated by the needs of the telegraph industry. Siemens' instrument was the first to come into widespread use and is so different and so much more practical than anything that had gone before that he is often credited as the inventor of the bathometer. His instrument consisted of a tube of mercury and worked similarly to a barometer. The pressure of the mercury acting under the force of gravity pushed down on, and deformed, a thin steel sheet. The height of the mercury in the column was thus proportional to the strength of the Earth's gravity field. The theory of the instrument was that the greater the depth of water under the ship, the lower the gravitational force would be. This is because water has a much lower density than the rocks of the Earth's crust. Starting in the mid-nineteenth century, submarine telegraph cables were being laid around the world. Accurate knowledge of the depth of the ocean bed was important for this work. Previously, depth was determined by taking soundings with a lead line, a time-consuming and difficult method.

== See also ==
- Bathymetry – Study of underwater depth of lake or ocean floors
- Depth sounding – Measuring the depths of a body of water
- Echo sounding – Method of measuring the depth of water
