= Internally grooved copper tube =

Internally grooved copper tubes, also known as "microfin tubes", are a small diameter coil technology for modern air conditioning and refrigeration systems. Grooved coils facilitate more efficient heat transfer than smooth coils. Small diameter coils have better rates of heat transfer than conventionally-sized condenser and evaporator coils with round copper tubes and aluminum or copper fin that have been the standard in the HVAC industry for many years. Small diameter coils can withstand the higher pressures required by the new generation of environmentally friendlier refrigerants. They have lower material costs because they require less refrigerant, fin, and coil materials. They enable the design of smaller and lighter high-efficiency air conditioners and refrigerators because the evaporator and condenser coils are smaller and lighter.

With MicroGroove technology, heat transfer is enhanced by grooving the inside surface of the tube. This increases the surface to volume ratio, mixes the refrigerant, and homogenizes refrigerant temperatures across the tube.

Tubes with MicroGroove technology can be made with copper or aluminium. Copper fins are an attractive alternative to aluminium due to the better corrosion resistance of copper and its antimicrobial benefits.

== Design ==
To use smaller tubes instead of conventional-sized tubes in air conditioners, heat exchangers must be redesigned including the fin and tube circuits. Design optimization requires the use of computational fluid dynamics to analyze airflow around the tubes and fins, as well as computer simulations of refrigerant flow and temperatures inside the tubes. This is important because the overall heat transfer coefficient of a coil is a function of the convection of the refrigerant inside the tube to the tube wall, conduction through the tube wall, and dissipation through the fins.

Engineering considerations for using MicroGroove include:

1. Determining the best ratio of transverse tube pitch to longitudinal tube pitch by fin efficiency analysis.
2. Optimizing transverse and longitudinal tube pitch by performance analysis and material cost.
3. Optimizing fin pattern by comparing performances of fins with different patterns through computational fluid dynamics-based simulations.
4. Testing the performance of heat exchangers with smaller diameter tubes.
5. Developing empirical equations for predicting performance of heat exchangers with smaller diameter tubes.

Published experiments on MicroGroove coil performance and energy efficiency take into account the effects of fin spacing and fin design, tube diameter, and tube circuitry. Tube circuitry is substantially different than for conventional coils. Coils should be optimized with respect to the number of paths between the inlet and outlet manifolds. Typically, smaller diameter tubes require more paths of shorter lengths. Published research on tube circuitry and fin design for heat exchangers made with 4 mm tubes are available.

Research on a heat exchanger redesign with 5-mm diameter tubes demonstrated a 5% greater heat exchange capacity than that of the same size heat exchanger with 7 mm diameter tubes. Also, the refrigerant charge of the 5 mm diameter tubes was less than the 7 mm diameter tubes. In China, Chigo, Gree, and Kelon are producing air conditioners with coils that have 5 mm diameter tubes.

A variety of fin designs have been developed for use with small-diameter copper tubes. The performance of slotted and louvered fin designs have been evaluated and compared as a function of various fin dimensions. Simulations have been used to optimize fin design performance.

== Refrigerants ==
The phasing out of CFC and HCFC refrigerants (e.g., HCFC-22, also known as R22) due to global warming concerns has helped to spur innovations in cooling technologies. Natural refrigerants such as carbon dioxide (R744) and propane (R290), as well as R-410A, have become attractive replacements for air conditioning and refrigeration applications.

Higher pressures are typically required to condense these new environmentally friendly refrigerants compared to those that are being phased out. Small diameter copper tubes are more desirable in applications with higher pressures. For tubes of the same thickness, smaller diameter tubes can withstand higher pressures than larger diameter tubes. Hence, as tube diameters decrease, burst pressures increase. This is because working pressure is directly proportional to wall thickness and inversely proportional to diameter. By designing coils with shorter tube lengths, less work is required to circulate the refrigerant. Therefore, refrigerant pressure drop factors due to small diameter tubes can be offset.

Carbon dioxide (R744) refrigerants are used in modern vending machines, refrigerated supermarket display cases, ice-skating rinks, and other emerging applications. Microgroove's smaller diameter copper tubes have the strength to withstand the very high gas cooler and burst pressures of R744 while allowing for lower overall refrigerant volumes.

Propane (R290) is an eco-friendly refrigerant with outstanding thermodynamic properties. The pressure requirements for R290 are much less than for carbon dioxide, but R290 is extremely flammable. Research has demonstrated that MicroGroove is suitable for R290-charged room air conditioners because the refrigerant charge requirement is dramatically reduced with smaller diameter copper tubes. The risk of tube explosions is dramatically reduced as well. Research conducted with propane in MicroGroove has implications for heat exchanger coils used in refrigerators, heat pumps and commercial air conditioning systems.

== Weight savings ==
In a design study of functionally equivalent 5 kW HVAC heat exchangers, tube materials in the coils weighed 3.09 kg for 9.52 mm diameter tube, 2.12 kg for 7 mm diameter tube, and 1.67 kg for 5 mm diameter tube. Tube weight was reduced by 31% when copper tube diameters were downsized from 3/8 inch to 7 mm. Tube weight was reduced by 46% when copper tube diameters were downsized from 3/8 inch to 5 mm. The weights of the fin materials in the coils was 3.55 kg for the 9.52 mm coils, 2.61 kg for the 7 mm coils, and 1.55 kg for the 5 mm coils.

== Antimicrobial ==
Copper is an antimicrobial material. Bio buildup can be reduced with copper coils. This helps to maintain high levels of energy efficiency for longer periods of time and avoids energy efficiency drop off over time.

The use of copper coils to inhibit the growth of fungi and bacteria is a recent development in innovative air conditioning and refrigeration products. OEM companies, such as Chigo in China and Hydronic in France, are now manufacturing all-copper antimicrobial air conditioning systems to improve indoor air quality.

== Materials ==
Smaller diameter refrigerant paths can also be realized with extruded aluminium tubes. These have been designed with several microchannels in one flat, ribbon-like tube. Aluminium microchannel technology offers significant advantages over conventional copper-aluminium round tube plate fin coil, including improved heat transfer performance and reduced refrigerant charge. However, copper MicroGroove offers higher heat transfer efficiencies than aluminium microchannel tubes and it enables smaller refrigerant volumes because the tube ends of MicroGroove are connected by small U-joints rather than large headers.

== Manufacturing ==
Copper tubes are often produced by a cast and roll process. Copper ingots are cast into mother tubes and these tubes are then drawn to a final shape, annealed, and enhanced with an inner surface texture to improve heat transfer performance. The production of small diameter copper tubes requires only the addition of one or two additional drawing passes to achieve 5 mm tube diameters.

Existing air conditioner coils made of round copper tubes and aluminium fins (CTAF coils) typically are mechanically assembled using tube expansion.

The equipment used in manufacturing Microgroove products expands the tubes circumferentially (i.e., the circumference of the tube is increased without changing the length). This "non-shrinkage" expansion allows for better control of tube lengths in preparation for subsequent assembly operations. Tubes are inserted, or laced, into the holes in a stack of precisely spaced fins. Expanders are inserted into the tubes and the tube diameters are increased slightly until mechanical contact is achieved between the tubes and fins. The high ductility of copper allows for this process to be performed accurately and precisely. Heat exchanger coils made in this manner have excellent durability and heat transfer properties.

The small-diameter tube project in China involves manufacturers who together account for more than 80 percent of HVAC production of approximately 75 million units. Several OEMs in North America are marketing residential air-conditioner products with copper tubes. Air-conditioner OEMs, including Guangdong Chigo Air Conditioning, the Refrigeration Research Institute of Guangdong Midea Refrigeration Appliances Group, and Shanghai Golden Dragon Refrigeration Technology Co., Ltd. have described the benefits of small-diameter copper tubes versus the standard for various designs and diameters. ACR coils from original equipment manufacturers (OEMs) Gree, Haier, Midea, Chigo and HiSense Kelon are also available.

== See also ==
- Copper in heat exchangers
