= Thermosiphon =

Method of heat exchange in which convection drives pumpless circulation

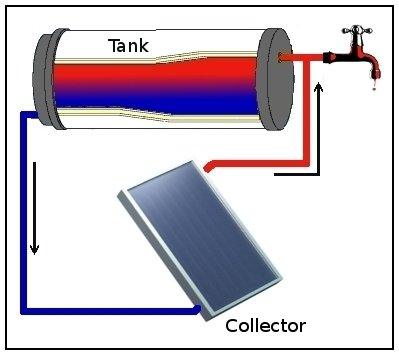
Thermosyphon circulation in a simple solar water heater (not a working model; there is no water supply to replenish the tank when the tap is used)

A thermosiphon (or thermosyphon) is a device that employs a method of passive heat exchange based on natural convection, which circulates a fluid without the necessity of a mechanical pump. Thermosiphoning is used for circulation of liquids and volatile gases in heating and cooling applications such as heat pumps, water heaters, boilers and furnaces. Thermosiphoning also occurs across air temperature gradients such as those occurring in a wood-fire chimney or solar chimney.

This circulation can either be open-loop, as when the substance in a holding tank is passed in one direction via a heated transfer tube mounted at the bottom of the tank to a distribution point — even one mounted above the originating tank — or it can be a vertical closed-loop circuit with return to the original container. Its purpose is to simplify the transfer of liquid or gas while avoiding the cost and complexity of a conventional pump.

== Simple thermosiphon ==
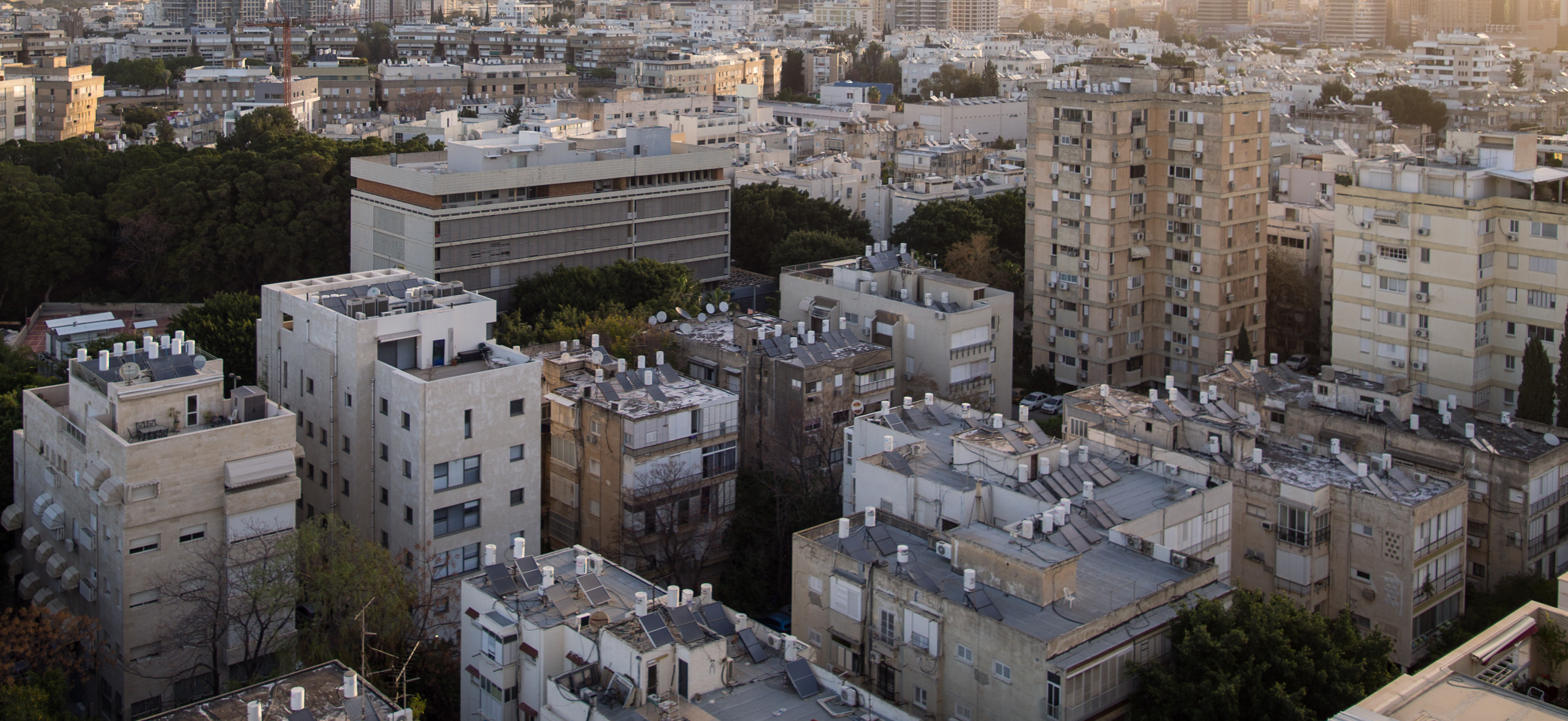
Thermosiphons on the roofs of Tel Aviv, Israel

Natural convection of the liquid starts when heat transfer to the liquid gives rise to a temperature difference from one side of the loop to the other. The phenomenon of thermal expansion means that a temperature difference will have a corresponding difference in density across the loop. The warmer fluid on one side of the loop is less dense and thus more buoyant than the cooler fluid on the other side. The warmer fluid will "float" above the cooler fluid, and the cooler fluid will "sink" below the warmer fluid. This phenomenon of natural convection is known by the saying "heat rises". Convection moves the heated liquid upwards in the system as it is simultaneously replaced by cooler liquid returning by gravity. A good thermosiphon has very little hydraulic resistance so that liquid can flow easily under the relatively low pressure produced by natural convection.

=== Heat pipes ===
In some situations the flow of liquid may be reduced further, or stopped, perhaps because the loop is not entirely full of liquid. In this case, the system no longer convects, so it is not a usual "thermosiphon".

Heat can still be transferred in this system by the evaporation and condensation of vapor; however, the system is properly classified as a heat pipe thermosyphon. If the system also contains other fluids, such as air, then the heat flux density will be less than in a real heat pipe, which contains only a single substance.

The thermosiphon has been sometimes incorrectly described as a 'gravity return heat pipe'. Heat pipes usually have a wick to return the condensate to the evaporator via capillary action. A wick is not needed in a thermosiphon because gravity moves the liquid. The wick allows heat pipes to transfer heat when there is no gravity, which is useful in space. A thermosiphon is "simpler" than a heat pipe.

(Single-phase) thermosiphons can only transfer heat "upward", or away from the acceleration vector. Thus, orientation is much more important for thermosiphons than for heatpipes. Also, thermosiphons can fail because of a bubble in the loop, and require a circulating loop of pipes.

=== Reboilers and calandria ===
If the piping of a thermosiphon resists flow, or excessive heat is applied, the liquid may boil. Since the gas is more buoyant than the liquid, the convective pressure is greater. This is a well known invention called a reboiler. A group of reboilers attached to a pair of plena is called a calandria. In some circumstances, for example the cooling system for an older (pre 1950s) car, the boiling of the fluid will cause the system to stop working, as the volume of steam created displaces too much of the water and circulation stops.

The term "phase change thermosiphon" is a misnomer and should be avoided. When phase change occurs in a thermosiphon, it means that the system either does not have enough fluid, or it is too small to transfer all of the heat by convection alone. To improve the performance, either more fluid is needed (possibly in a larger thermosiphon), or all other fluids (including air) should be pumped out of the loop.

== Solar energy ==
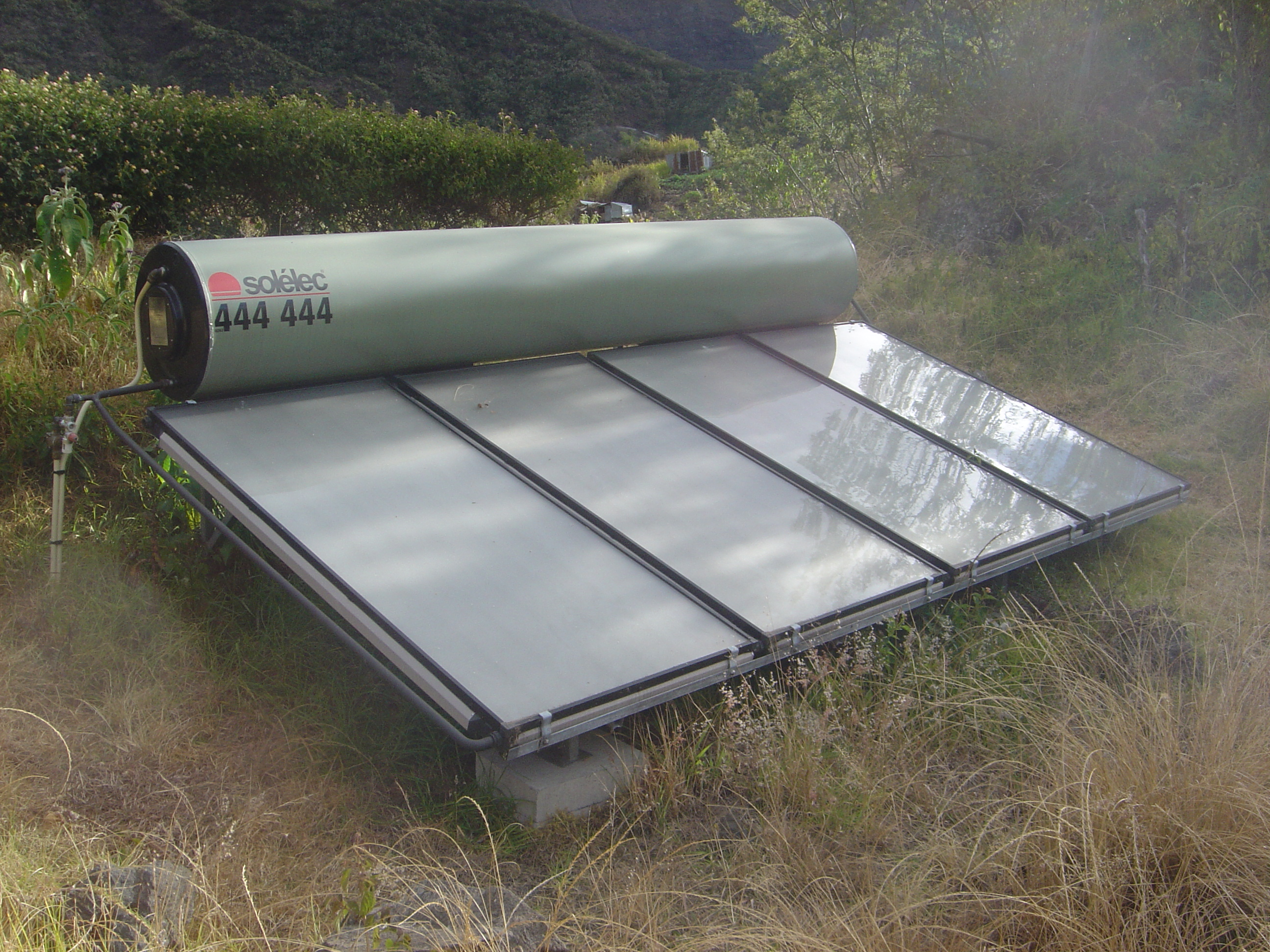
Solar heating system featuring a thermosiphon

Thermosiphons are used in some liquid-based solar heating systems to heat a liquid such as water. The water is heated passively by solar energy and relies on heat energy being transferred from the sun to a solar collector. The heat from the collector can be transferred to water in two ways: directly where water circulates through the collector, or indirectly where an anti-freeze solution carries the heat from the collector and transfers it to water in the tank via a heat exchanger. Convection allows for the movement of the heated liquid out of the solar collector to be replaced by colder liquid which is in turn heated. Due to this principle, it is necessary for the water to be stored in a tank above the collector.

== Architecture ==
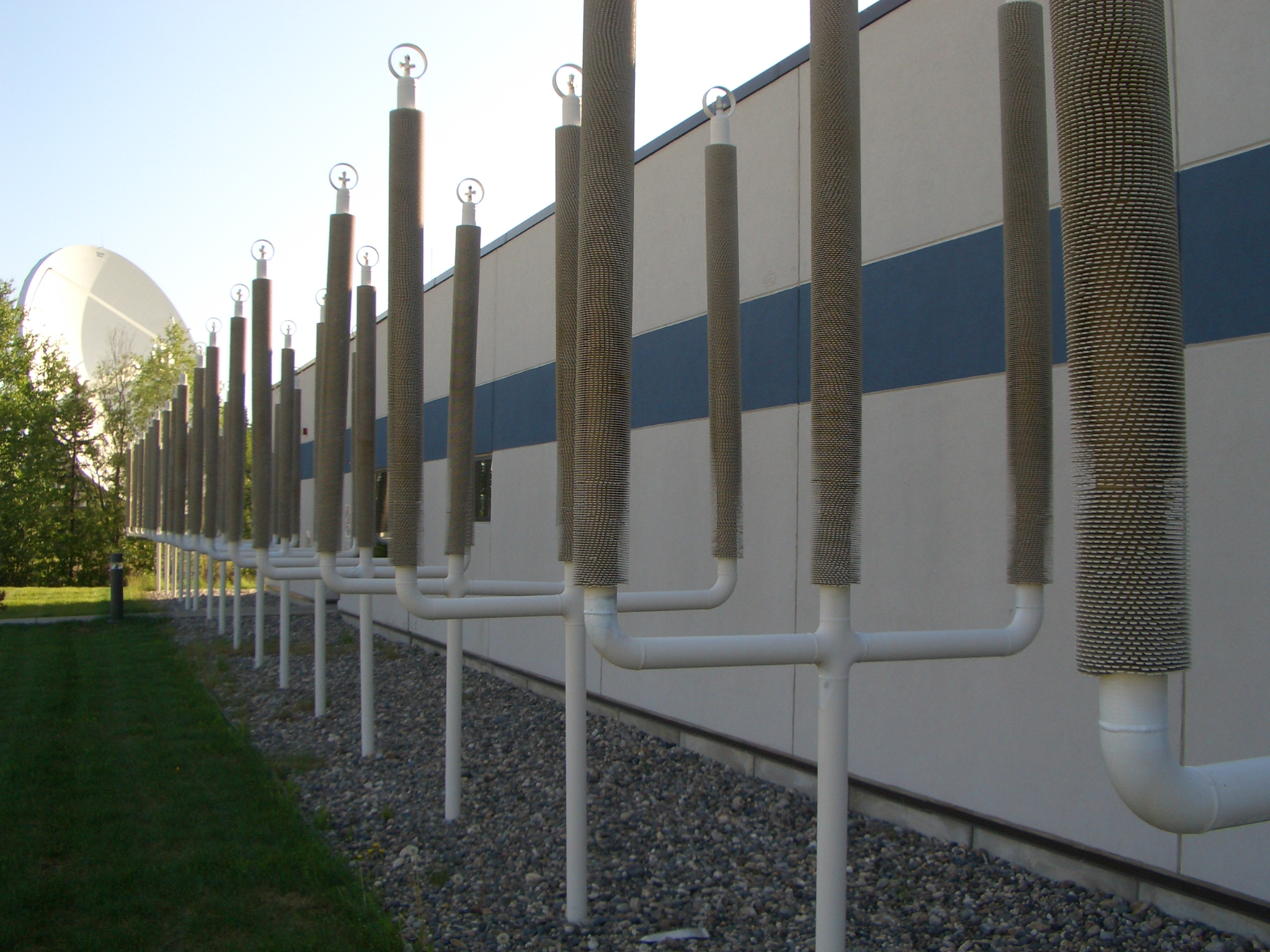
Thermosiphon array at the Fairbanks International Airport, used to chill the permafrost upon which the buildings of the airport are built. The building foundations are at risk of dislocation if the permafrost thaws.

In locations historically dominated by permafrost conditions, thermosiphons may be used to counter adverse geologic forces on the foundations of buildings, pipelines and other structures caused by the thawing of the permafrost. A study published in 2006 by oil giant ConocoPhillips reports that Alaska's permafrost, upon which much of the state's infrastructure is built, has degraded since 1982 amid record warm temperatures. According to the Alaska Climate Research Center at the University of Alaska Fairbanks, between 1949 and 2018 the average annual temperature in Alaska rose 4.0 degrees Fahrenheit, with an increase of 7.2 degrees Fahrenheit over the winter.

== Computing ==
Thermosiphons are used for watercooling internal computer components, most commonly the processor. While any suitable liquid can be used, water is the easiest liquid to use in thermosiphon systems. Unlike traditional watercooling systems, thermosiphon systems do not rely on a pump but on convection for the movement of heated water (which may become vapour) from the components upwards to a heat exchanger. There the water is cooled and is ready to be recirculated. The most commonly used heat exchanger is a radiator, where fans actively blow air across an increased surface area to condense the vapour to a liquid. The denser liquid falls, thus recirculating through the system and repeating the process. No pump is required. The cycle of evaporation and condensation is driven by the difference in temperature and gravity.

=== Uses ===
Without proper cooling, a modern processor chip can rapidly reach temperatures that cause it to malfunction. Even with a common heat sink and fan attached, typical processor operating temperatures may still reach up to 70 °C (160 °F). A thermosiphon can efficiently transfer heat over a much wider temperature range and can typically maintain the processor temperature 10–20 °C cooler than a traditional heat sink and fan. In some cases, it is also possible that a thermosiphon may cover multiple heat sources and, design-wise, be more compact than an appropriately sized conventional heat sink and fan.

=== Drawbacks ===
Thermosiphons must be mounted such that vapor rises up and liquid flows down to the boiler, with no bends in the tubing for liquid to pool. Also, the thermosiphon's fan that cools the gas needs cool air to operate. The system has to be completely airtight; if not, the process of thermosiphon will not take effect and cause the water to only evaporate over a small period of time.

== Engine cooling ==
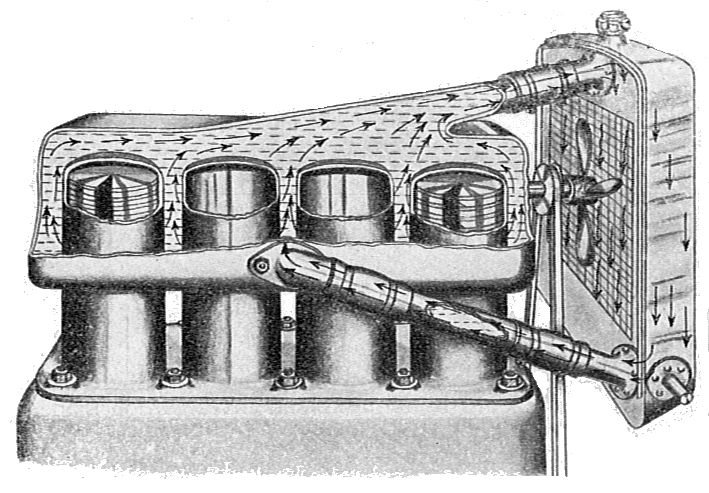
1937 diagram of engine cooling entirely by thermosiphon circulation

Some early cars, motor vehicles, and engine-powered farm and industrial equipment used thermosiphon circulation to move cooling water between their cylinder block and radiator. This method of water circulation depends on keeping enough cool air moving past the radiator to provide a sufficient temperature differential; the air movement was accomplished by the forward motion of the vehicle and by the use of fans. As engine power increased, increased flow of water was required, so engine-driven pumps were added to assist circulation. More compact engines began to use smaller radiators and require more convoluted flow patterns, so the water circulation became entirely dependent on the pump and might even be reversed against its natural direction. An engine that circulates its cooling water only by thermosiphon is susceptible to overheating during prolonged periods of idling or very slow travel since the lack of forward motion provides too little airflow past the radiator, unless one or more fans are able to move enough air by themselves. Thermosiphon systems are also very sensitive to low coolant level, i.e. losing only a small amount of coolant stops the circulation; a pump-driven system is much more robust and can typically handle a lower coolant level.

== Espresso machines ==
Many espresso machine designs use a thermosiphon in order to maintain a stable temperature.

The E-61 espresso machine has a group head with a thermosiphon. This group head is common on many espresso machines today.

Some lever espresso machines have a double wall around the piston in their group that is used for a thermosiphon. A modern example would be the machines from Londinium.

== See also ==
- Convection – Fluid flow that occurs due to heterogeneous fluid properties and body forces
- Geothermal heat pump – System to transfer heat to/from the ground
- Heat pipe – Heat-transfer device that employs phase transition and Loop heat pipe – Two-phase heat transfer device
- Passive solar – Architectural engineering that uses the Sun's heat without electric or mechanical systems
- Reboiler – Type of heat exchanger
- Siphon – Device involving the flow of liquids through tubes
- Solar heating – Device that collects heat
- Thermic siphon – Heat-exchanging element in the firebox of some steam boilers
- Vapor-compression refrigeration – Refrigeration process
- Watercooling – Method of heat removal from components and industrial equipment
- Thomas Fowler (inventor)
