= Micro-loop heat pipe =

Two-phase heat-transfer device

A micro-loop heat pipe or MLHP is a miniature loop heat pipe in which the radius of curvature of the liquid meniscus in the evaporator is in the same order of magnitude of the micro grooves' dimensions; or a miniature loop heat pipe which has been fabricated using microfabrication techniques.
