= Angier March Perkins =

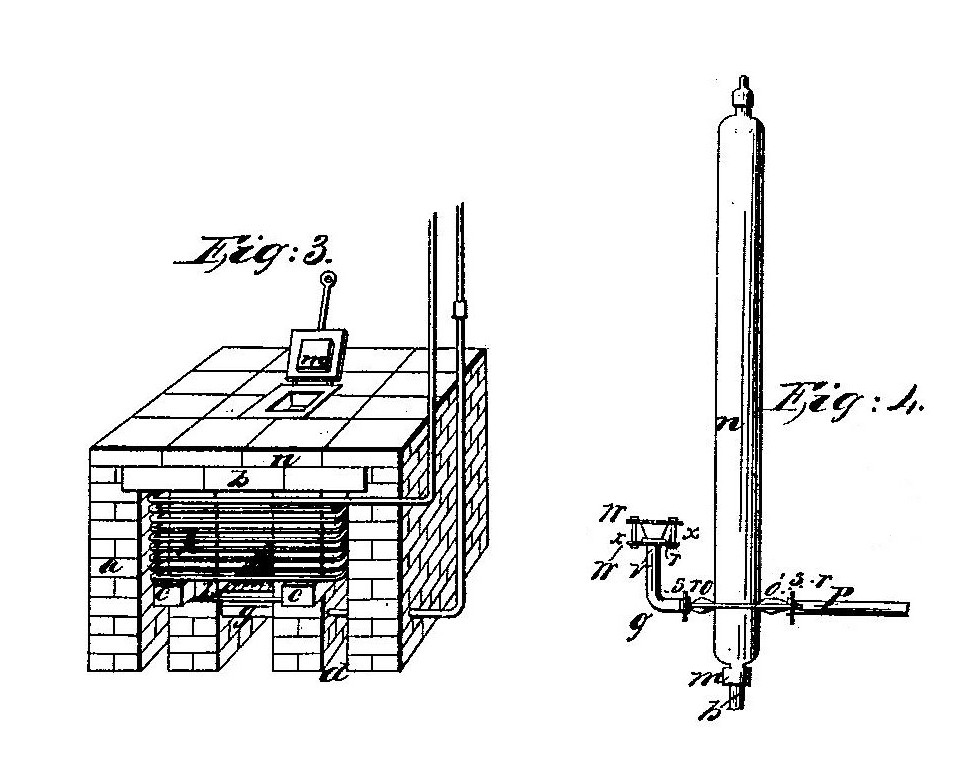
Details of furnace and expansion tube from Perkins' 1838 Patent

Angier March Perkins (21 August 1799 – 22 April 1881) was an American engineer who worked most of his career in the United Kingdom and was instrumental in developing the new technologies of central heating.

== Life ==
Perkins was born in Old Newburyport, Massachusetts, the second son of six children of Jacob Perkins and his wife, Hannah, née Greenleaf. His name came from that of his father's brother in-law and close friend Angier March. Jacob Perkins travelled to the UK in 1819 in order to exploit his bank note printing inventions and Angier March followed in 1821 to join his father in the printing business.

Angier March eventually took charge of his father's business but in 1828 launched his own heating and steam engineering enterprise. He married Julia Georgina Brown in 1831 and in the same year filed the first of his patents for heating equipment. His first steam heating system was installed in 1832 in the home of Governor of the Bank of England John Horley Palmer so that the owner could grow grapes. He also installed heating systems in commercial premises. Angier March's business prospered and he moved to larger premises, sharing an office with his father who, though still inventive, enjoyed less commercial success.

He ultimately became involved in improved methods for smelting iron and designs for piping and plumbing fittings. His high-pressure steam technology proved to have other uses, including a mobile baker's oven for the British Army.

== Family ==
Angier March had two sons:

- Angier Greenleaf Perkins (1832–1871), also an engineer;
- Loftus Perkins (1834–1891), was apprenticed to his father in 1848 becoming a partner in A. M. Perkins & Son in 1866.

Angier March died April 22, 1881, at his family home in Hampstead and was buried in the family vault in Kensal Green Cemetery. He was age 81.

== Honours and offices ==
- Associate of the Institution of Civil Engineers, (1840);
- Fellow of the Royal Society of Arts, (1849).

== Bibliography ==
- Ferris, F. J. (2002). "The Perkins Family: A Short History about Four Generations of Engineers". Heritage Group Website for The Chartered Institution of Building Services Engineers. Archived from the original on 21 August 2007.
- McConnell, A. (2004) "Perkins, Angier March (1799–1881)", Oxford Dictionary of National Biography, Oxford University Press, accessed 14 August 2007 (subscription required)
