= Loop heat pipe =

Two-phase heat transfer device

A loop heat pipe (LHP) is a two-phase heat transfer device that uses capillary action to remove heat from a source and passively move it to a condenser or radiator. LHPs are similar to heat pipes but have the advantage of being able to provide reliable operation over long distance and the ability to operate against gravity. They can transport a large heat load over a long distance with a small temperature difference. Different designs of LHPs ranging from powerful, large size LHPs to miniature LHPs (micro-loop heat pipe) have been developed and successfully employed in a wide sphere of applications both ground and space-based applications.

== Construction ==
The most common coolants used in LHPs are anhydrous ammonia and propylene. LHPs are made by controlling the volumes of the reservoir carefully, condenser and vapor and liquid lines so that liquid is always available to the wick. The reservoir volume and fluid charge are set so that there is always fluid in the reservoir even if the condenser and vapor and liquid lines are completely filled.

Generally small pore size and large capillary pumping capability are necessary in a wick. There must be a balance in the wick pumping capability and the wick permeability when designing a heat pipe or loop heat pipe.

== Mechanism ==
In a loop heat pipe, first the heat enters the evaporator and vaporizes the working fluid at the wick outer surface. The vapor then flows down the system of grooves and then goes to the evaporator and the vapor line towards the condenser, where it condenses as heat is removed by the radiator. The two-phase reservoir (or compensation chamber) at the end of the evaporator is specifically designed to operate at a slightly lower temperature than the evaporator (and the condenser). The lower saturation pressure in the reservoir draws the condensate through the condenser and liquid return line. The fluid then flows into a central pipe where it feeds the wick. A secondary wick hydraulically links the reservoir and the primary wick.

== Motivation: limitations of heat pipes ==
Loop heat pipes overcome some of the shortcomings of conventional heat pipes, which while being excellent heat transfer devices are mainly confined to transferring relatively small heat loads over relatively short distances when the evaporator and condenser are at same horizontal level. This limitation on the part of heat pipes is mainly related to the major pressure losses associated with the liquid flow through the porous structure, present along the entire length of the heat pipe, and viscous interaction between the vapor and liquid phases, also called entrainment losses. For the applications involving transfer of large heat loads over long distances, the thermal performance of the heat pipes is badly affected by increase in these losses. For the same reason conventional heat pipes are very sensitive to the change in orientation in gravitational field. For the unfavorable slopes in an evaporator-above-condenser configuration, the pressure losses due to the mass forces in gravity field adds to the total pressure losses and further affect the efficiency of the heat transfer process.

As a result of these limitations, different solutions involving structural modifications to the conventional heat pipe have been proposed. Some of these modifications incorporate arterial tubes with considerably low hydraulic resistance for liquid return to the heat source (arterial heat pipes), while others provide spatial separation of the vapor and liquid phases of the working fluid at the transportation section (separated line heat pipes).

Though these new forms of heat pipes are able to transfer significant heat flows and can increase heat transport length, they remain very sensitive to spatial orientation relative to gravity. To extend the functional possibilities of two-phase systems to applications involving otherwise inoperable slopes in gravity, the advantages provided by the spatial separation of the transportation line and the usage of non-capillary arteries are combined in a loop scheme. This scheme allows heat pipes to be created with higher heat transfer characteristics while maintaining normal operation in any directional orientation. The loop scheme forms the basis of the physical concept of Two-Phase Loops (TPLs).

== Origins ==
Loop heat pipes were patented in USSR in 1974 by Yury F. Gerasimov and Yury F. Maydanik (Inventor's certificate No. 449213), all of the former Soviet Union. The patent for LHPs was filed in the USA in 1982 (Patent № 4515209).

== Applications ==
The first space application occurred aboard a Russian spacecraft in 1989. LHPs are now commonly used in space aboard satellites including; Russian Granat, Obzor spacecraft, Boeing's (Hughes) HS 702 communication satellites, Chinese FY-1C meteorological satellite, NASA's ICESat.

LHPs were demonstrated on the NASA space shuttle in 1997 with STS-83 and STS-94.

Loop heat pipes are important parts of systems for cooling electronic components.

== See also ==
- Heat pipe
- Thermosiphon
