= Steam generator =

A Steam generator is a device used to boil water to create steam. More specifically, it may refer to:

- Boiler (steam generator), a closed vessel in which water is heated under pressure
- Heat recovery steam generator
- Monotube steam generator
- Supercritical steam generator or Benson boiler, a high-pressure steam generator that operates in the supercritical pressure regime, such that no boiling takes place within it.
- Steam generator (auxiliary boiler), a steam-powered boiler used on ships to produce a low-pressure steam, heated by a high-pressure steam supply rather than a flame.
- Steam generator (boiler), an oil- or gas-fired boiler, based on a low-water content monotube coil.
- Steam generator (nuclear power), a heat exchanger in a pressurized water nuclear reactor.
- Steam generator (railroad), a device used in trains to provide heat to passenger cars.
