= Flash boiler =

Water-tube boiler

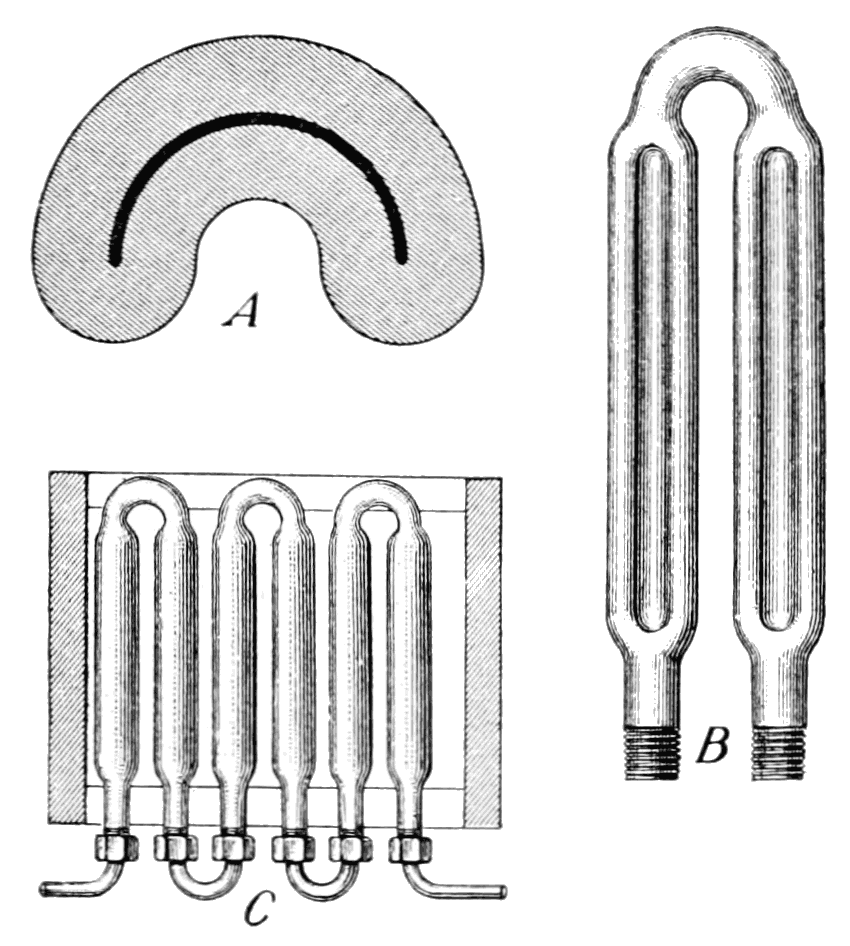
Diagram of a Serpollet flash boiler. Note the thick wall of the tube, which provides a store of heat

A flash boiler is a type of water-tube boiler. The tubes are close together and water is pumped through them. A flash boiler differs from the type of monotube steam generator in which the tube is permanently filled with water. In a flash boiler, the tube is kept so hot that the water feed is quickly flashed into steam and superheated. Flash boilers had some use in automobiles in the 19th century and this use continued into the early 20th century.

== History ==
There is disagreement about the exact definition of a flash boiler. Some writers use the term interchangeably with monotube boiler and there is even use of the term semi-flash boiler. However, the flash boiler is generally attributed to Léon Serpollet who used a flash boiler in the Gardner-Serpollet steam-powered car from 1896. Serpollet's boiler was a low-water-content type with thick-walled tubes to provide a store of heat. Serpollet patented a steam generator in 1888, US Patent 379,421, but this is an early version which differs from the one illustrated above.

== Benefits and drawbacks ==
Flash boilers are lighter and less bulky than other types and take less time to raise steam from a cold start. However, they are more prone to overheating because there is no large reservoir to cool the tubes if the water flow is interrupted or inadequate.

== Fuel ==
Flash boilers are normally fired by liquid or gaseous fuel because this allows a quick response to changes in the demand for steam. However, experiments with solid fuel firing have been made.

== Uses ==
Historically, flash boilers were used in some steam cars, where rapid steam-raising was an advantage. During the Second World War they were used in Royal Navy steam gun boats (SGBs). Modern use is largely confined to model steam boats.

== See also ==
- Du Temple Monoplane
- List of boiler types by manufacturer
- Monotube steam generator
- Steam generator (boiler)

== Bibliography ==
- Westbury, Edgar T. (1984) [1949]. Flash Steam. Percival Marshall / TEE Publishing. ISBN 0-905100-59-X.
- Benson, J.H.; Rayman, A.A. (2000) [1973]. Experimental Flash Steam. TEE Publishing. ISBN 1-85761-116-0.
