= Léon Serpollet =

French engineer (1858-1907)

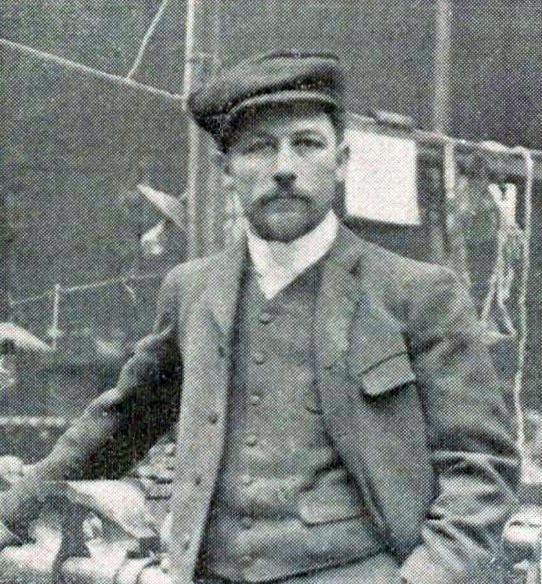
- Léon Serpollet in 1906
- Born: 4 October 1858; Culoz, France
- Died: 1 February 1907 (aged 48); Paris, France
- Monuments: Statue by Jean Boucher; Parc Léon Serpollet
- Occupation: Engineer
- Organization: Gardner-Serpollet
- Known for: Flash steam boilers; Steam automobile design; Steam tram design; Holding the World land speed record

Léon Serpollet (4 October 1858 – 1 February 1907) was a French engineer and developer of flash steam boilers and steam automobiles.

Léon Serpollet was born in Culoz, in the Ain department of France in 1859, son of the carpenter Auguste Serpollet. He went into the family business with his brother Henri (1848–1915) producing circular saws and wood working machines. It was when seeking to power their workshops that Henri came up with the idea of flash steam generation, with a patent applied for on 25 October 1879.

Leon went to Paris to study engineering at the Conservatoire national des arts et métiers, and at the same time he continued to develop the flash steam concept with his brother by post. In 1886 the two brothers arrived at their best design of flash steam boiler, and then shortly afterwards they went into business building flash steam boilers, initially small scale to power lighting systems and pumps, but soon to power tricycles and steam boats, and eventually to cars, trams, and buses.

Not only was Léon Serpollet a talented engineer, but he also drove his own cars in various races and rallies, for in the first years of the 20th century his steam cars were faster than any internal combustion engine cars, as he proved when he took the world land speed record in 1902 at Nice promenade at 120.80 km/h.

Serpollet's steam cars meant he had contact with many distinguished customers, including the future King Edward VII, the Maharajah of Mysore, and the Shah of Persia - Mozaffar ad-Din Shah Qajar, who in 1900 conferred on him the Order of the Lion and the Sun. In 1900 he was made a Chevalier of the Legion of Honour.

Leon Serpollet died aged 48 of tuberculosis, and with his passing the interest in steam cars seemed to wane, especially in France, there were no steam cars on show at the Paris Salon automobile show of 1908. His influence on the automotive industry had been substantial as stated in many obituaries, for example "The death of M. Leon Serpollet has removed from our midst a pioneer in the motor industry, whose genius in the cause of automobilism can only be compared to that of Stephenson for the locomotive"...."The death of M. Serpollet is a heavy loss to the industry." In another obituary "M. Serpollet's name has been for a score of years as well known in the world of the steam motor-car as is that of Marquis de Dion in the region of internal combustion vehicles".

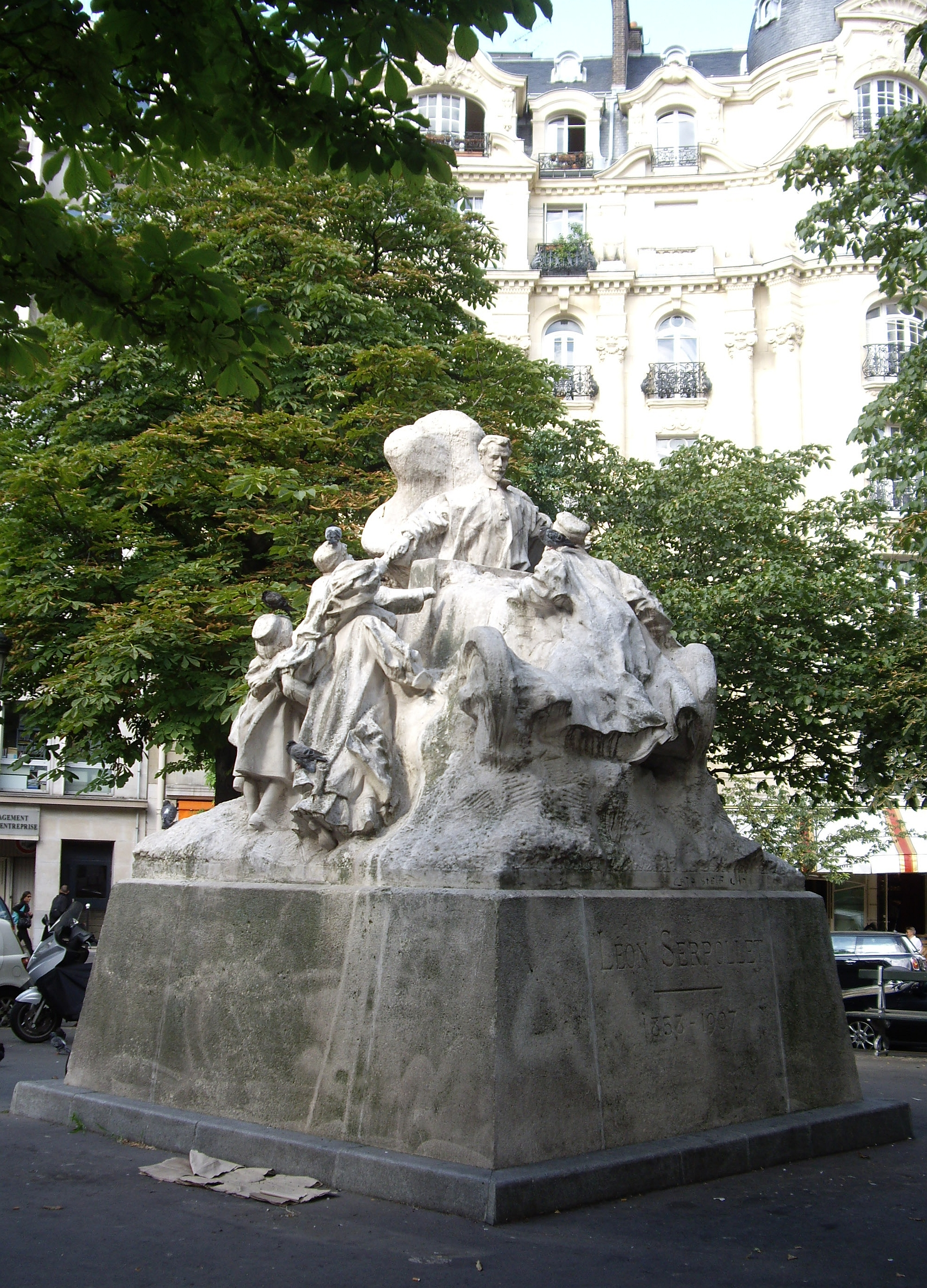
Statue by Jean Boucher

Léon Serpollet is commemorated by a statue by Jean Boucher at the Place Saint-Ferdinand (48.877969°N 2.288112°E) in Paris' 17th arrondissement, and the Parc Léon Serpollet (48.89228°N 2.33831°E) in its 18th arrondissement.

== Serpollet frères et Cie ==
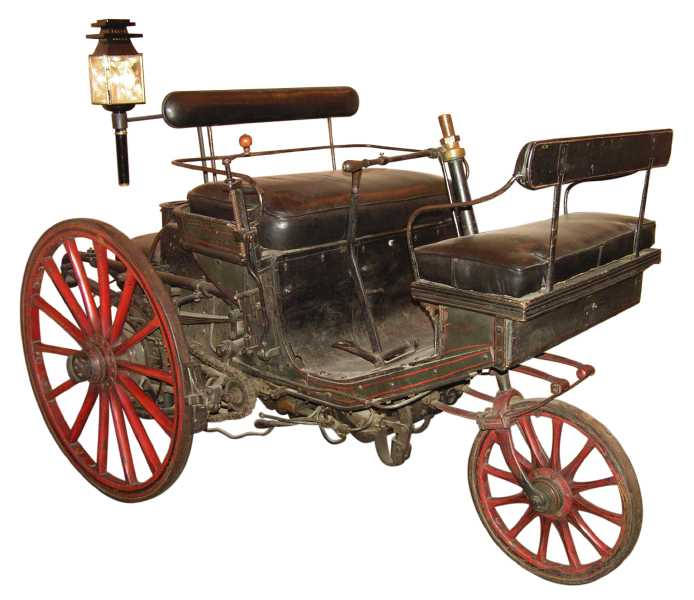
Léon Serpollet's coal-fired steam tricycle (1888) at the Musée des Arts et Métiers

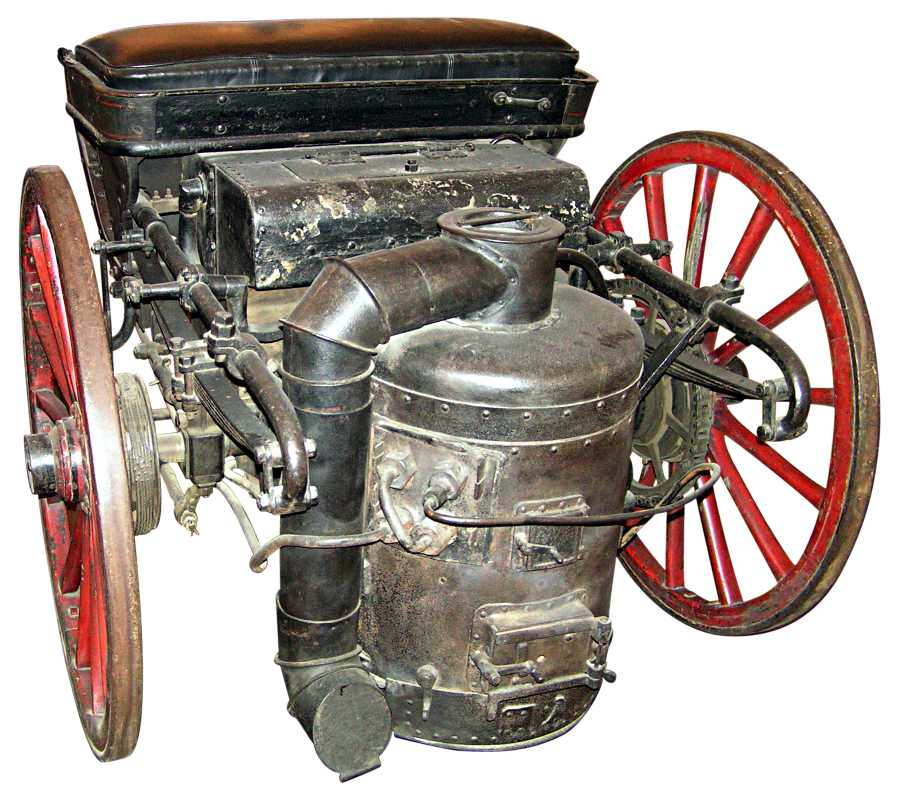
Rear view of Serpollet's steam tricycle, 1888

In 1886 Leon teamed up with an industrialist, Larsonneau, an enthusiastic partner who helps him to create "Serpollet frères et Cie" and to open workshops on rue des Cloÿs in Paris, in the 18th district, a location that has become the Parc Léon Serpollet today. Léon continued to revise and develop the flash steam boiler design changing it from flat plates to tubes, which led to further patents (e.g. CH1038 1889, CH7958 1894, CH12280 1896). Léon's engineering talents had been spotted by Armand Peugeot who provided the firm with financial support. Serpollet then used his flash boiler to create a steam powered tricycle, which was exhibited by Peugeot at the 1889 World's Fair in Paris. Peugeot produced several of the steam tricycles under licence, now known as the Peugeot Type 1.

In the 1890s Léon Serpollet was involved in applying his flash steam boiler to tramcars. In January 1897 he entertained a deputation from Aberdeen at his depot in Willesden, London, where he displayed a 4-seater Phaeton, and a double-decker steam tramcar for 50 people running on a test track. A report in 1897 on the Paris Tramway system stated that 60 Serpollet trams were in use, and another 40 were to be added over the next few months.

The key characteristics of flash steam boilers stem from the fact that there is very little water in the boiler at any moment, which leads to fast startup, and minimal explosion risk - they also provide high steam pressures and temperatures which can give high thermal efficiency, but were not ideal for the steam engines of the time. In addition flash boilers needed a sophisticated control system to ensure the water injected to the boiler and the heat from the burner matched, and that the steam produced matched the demand of the engine. In addition to the control system, Léon also had to devise a better steam engine design suited to very high pressure steam, using poppet valves the actuation of which presents a problem with providing the variable cut-off needed to allow steam to work expansively. Numerous Serpollet patents in different countries cover the inventions designed to overcome these difficulties (e.g. CH12280 30 May 1896, GB190005128 17 Mar 1900, US680000 6 Aug 1901). The solution was to use a form of variable valve timing, where the camshaft moved along its axis and so changed the cam profile driving the valve movements - this arrangement also allowing the Serpollet engine to be reversed.

== Gardner-Serpollet ==
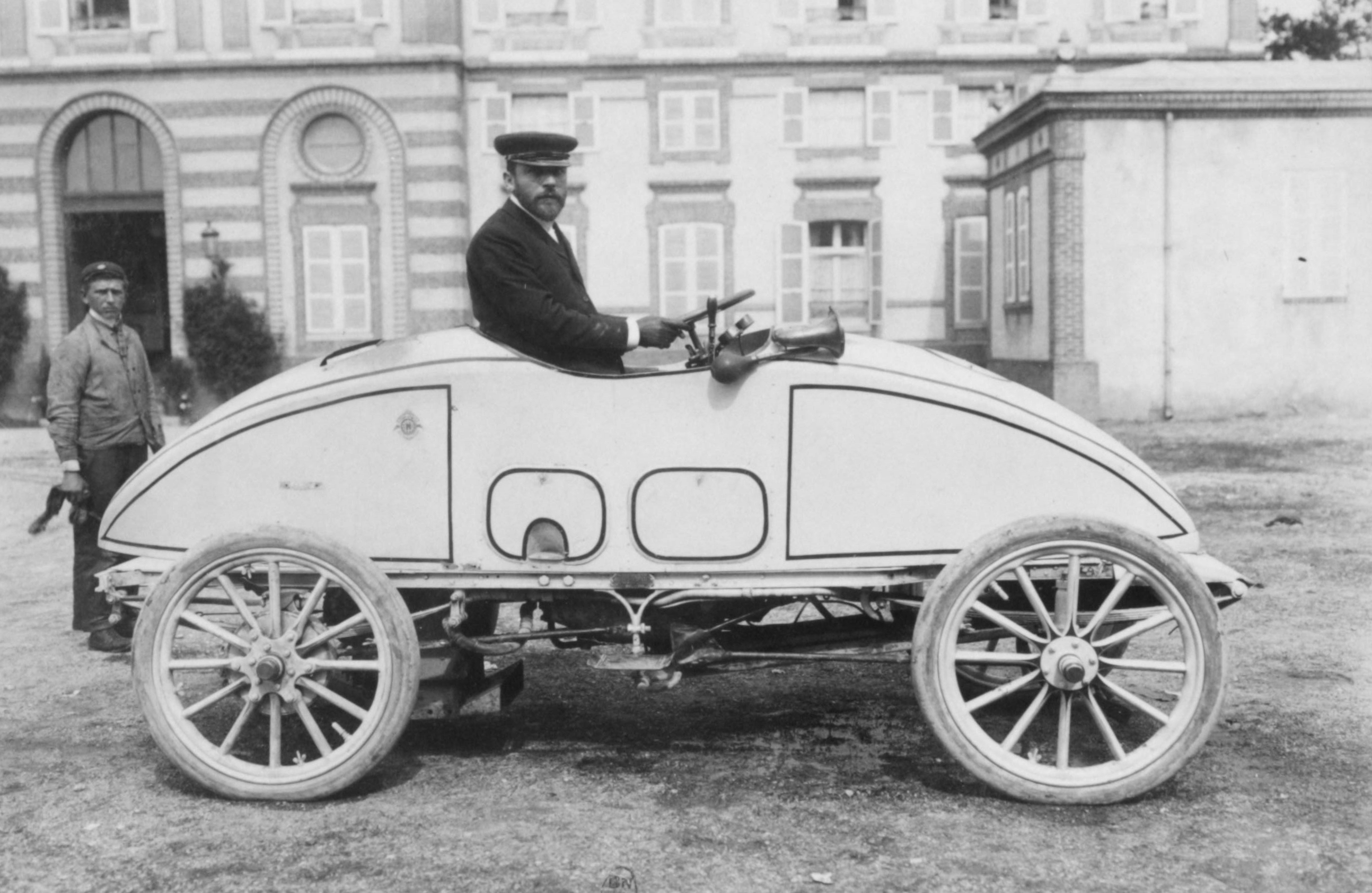
Léon Serpollet in his Œuf de Pâques at Deauville, 26 August 1902

Main article Gardner-Serpollet

In 1898 the brothers met a wealthy investor named Frank Gardner, and together they formed the Gardner-Serpollet Company. The performance of the cars they produced was very competitive against the internal combustion engines of the time. For example, at the Bexhill Speed Trials in 1902, Léon Serpollet in a 20HP Gardner-Serpollet Racing Car won the Daily Mail Cup, and the Paris Cup, and an 8HP Gardner-Serpollet with 4 people aboard won the Tourist class. Léon Serpollet also held the World land speed record, at 120.80 kilometres per hour (75.06 mph), achieved in April 1902 driving the steam powered Gardner-Serpollet Œuf de Pâques (Œuf de Pâques). Gardner-Serpollet also got involved in steam boats, and exhibited one at the Steam Boat Exhibition in Monaco in 1904. A further business interest of Gardner-Serpollet was in railway steam-cars, which they named 'autonomobile' carriages, and in December 1902 and January 1903 it was widely reported that three of the new powered carriages were scheduled in June 1903 to run from Paris to Dijon at 100 km/hour. However, there appears to be no records to confirm this happened.

== Darracq-Serpollet ==
In 1906 the Darracq-Serpollet company was formed for the manufacture of steam omnibuses and heavy traction vehicles, with Leon Serpollet as one of the managing directors. Later in 1906 a Darracq-Serpollet omnibus made a demonstration tour of England and Scotland, it attracted great interest, and was reported to do 6 miles on a gallon of paraffin. The Darracq-Serpollet buses and commercial vehicles used the double-acting two cylinder version of the Serpollet patented engine design. Unfortunately, in the autumn of 1906 Leon Serpollet developed symptoms of a serious illness, dying in February 1907, and this had a major impact on the business, which has been at the time transitioning from the old works of M. Serpollet to a new factory.

The new factory was in use by late 1907, and many buses were made, notably for the Metropolitan Steam Omnibus Company who ordered 20 in 1907 increasing to 63 later, and the National Steam Car Company. Commercial vehicles were also made and in a report on a trial of Daracq-Serpollet vehicles Commercial Motor magazine gave details of the steam generator, saying steam pressures of 300psi were typical but this could be increased to 900psi with the steam pipes glowing dull red.

Darracq-Serpollet were not purely omnibus builders, and at the commercial motor show at Olympia in 1908 they exhibited a new 12-15 hp chassis suitable for light vans, a 30-40 hp bus or lorry chassis, the same chassis fitted with a 3-ton van body (by Liversidge), a 30-40 hp lorry with cast steel wheels, a 30-40 hp Metropolitan Steam Omnibus Company double-decker bus, and a 20-25 hp 2-ton lorry with body by Bayleys Ltd.

However, while there were good reports of the vehicles, the Darracq-Serpollet business was not profitable and was wound down in 1910, being eventually closed completely in 1912.

The Metropolitan Steam Omnibus Company ceased using its Darracq-Serpollet steam buses on 16 October 1912, but many buses were sold on and used elsewhere. AH Creeth & Sons of the Isle of Wight acquired its first Darracq-Serpollet steam bus in 1909, and went on to acquire 3 more, reputed to be the last Darracq-Serpollet steam buses in service before they gave way to petrol in 1919.

== See also ==
- History of steam road vehicles
