= Inspiration (car) =

Steam powered land speed record holder

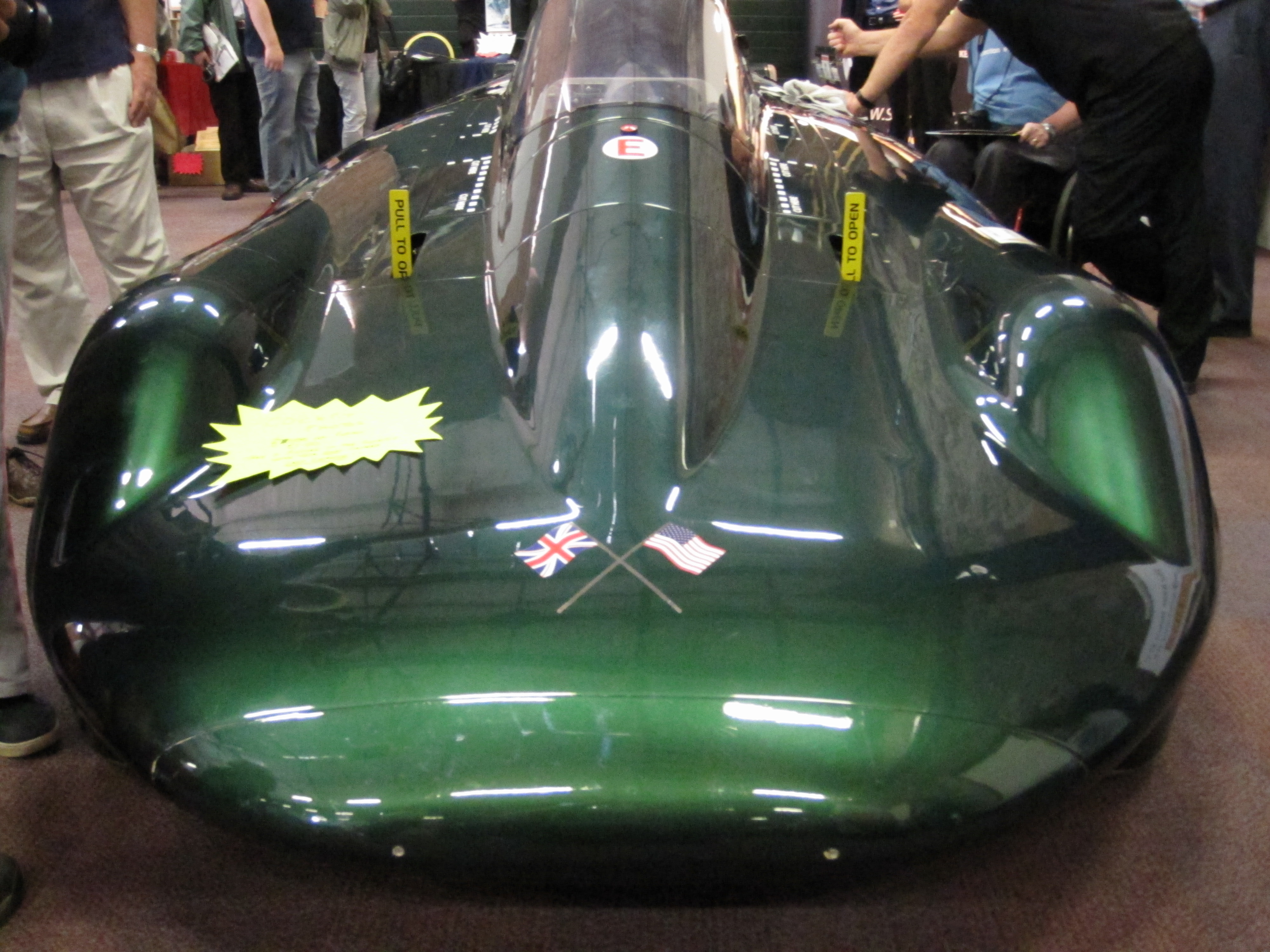
- at the Steam Museum, Swindon

Overview
- Manufacturer: British Steam Car Challenge
- Designer: Glynne Bowsher

Body and chassis
- Class: Land Speed Record (steam)
- Chassis: Steel space frame

Powertrain
- Engine: Two stage turbine driven by superheated steam

Dimensions
- Length: 7.6 m
- Width: 1.7 m
- Height: 1.7 m
- Curb weight: 3 tons

Chronology
- Predecessor: Stanley Steamer

Inspiration is a British-designed and -built steam-propelled car designed by Glynne Bowsher and developed by the British Steam Car Challenge team.

Inspiration holds the World Land Speed Record for a steam-powered vehicle on 25 August 2009, driven by Charles Burnett III with an average speed of 139.8 mph (225 km/h) over two consecutive runs over a measured mile. This broke the longest-standing land speed record set in 1906 by Fred Marriott in the Stanley Steamer. On 26 August 2009 the car, driven by Don Wales, broke a second record by achieving an average speed of 148.308 mph (239 km/h) over two consecutive runs over a measured kilometre.

The runs were made at Edwards Air Force Base in California, United States. The car is 7.6 m long, 1.7 m wide and weighs 3 tons. It is powered by a two-stage turbine driven by superheated steam from 12 boilers containing distilled water. The boilers are heated by burners which burn Liquid Petroleum Gas to produce 3 Megawatts (10.2 million BTU/hr) of heat. The steam produced is at a temperature of 400 °C (750 °F) and a pressure of 4000 kN/m^{2} 40 bar (580 psi). The engine is capable of developing 288 kW (386 hp; 392 PS) and consumes around 40 litres (8.8 Impgal) of water per minute).

The car has been retired to the National Motor Museum Trust at Beaulieu, England.

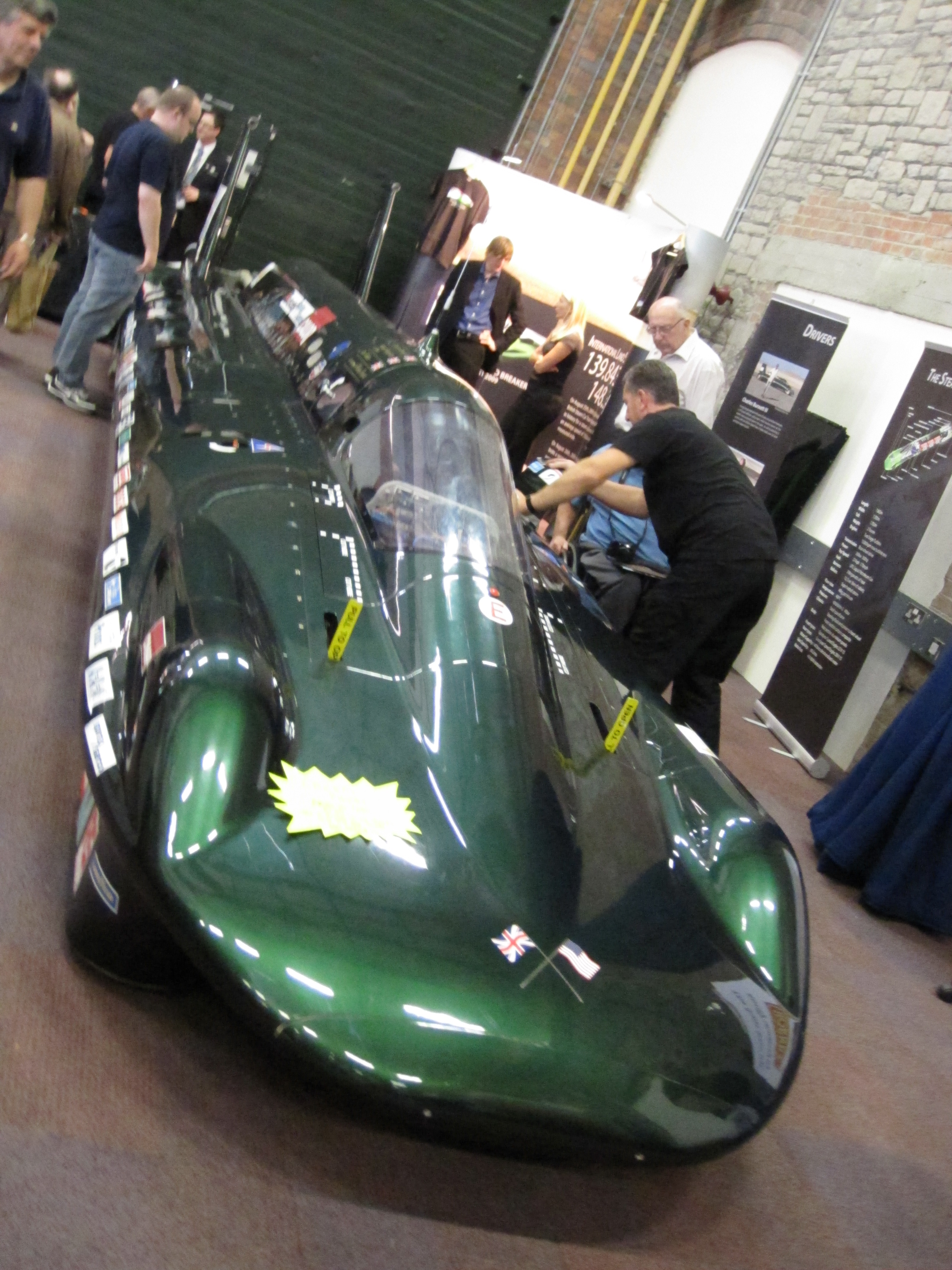

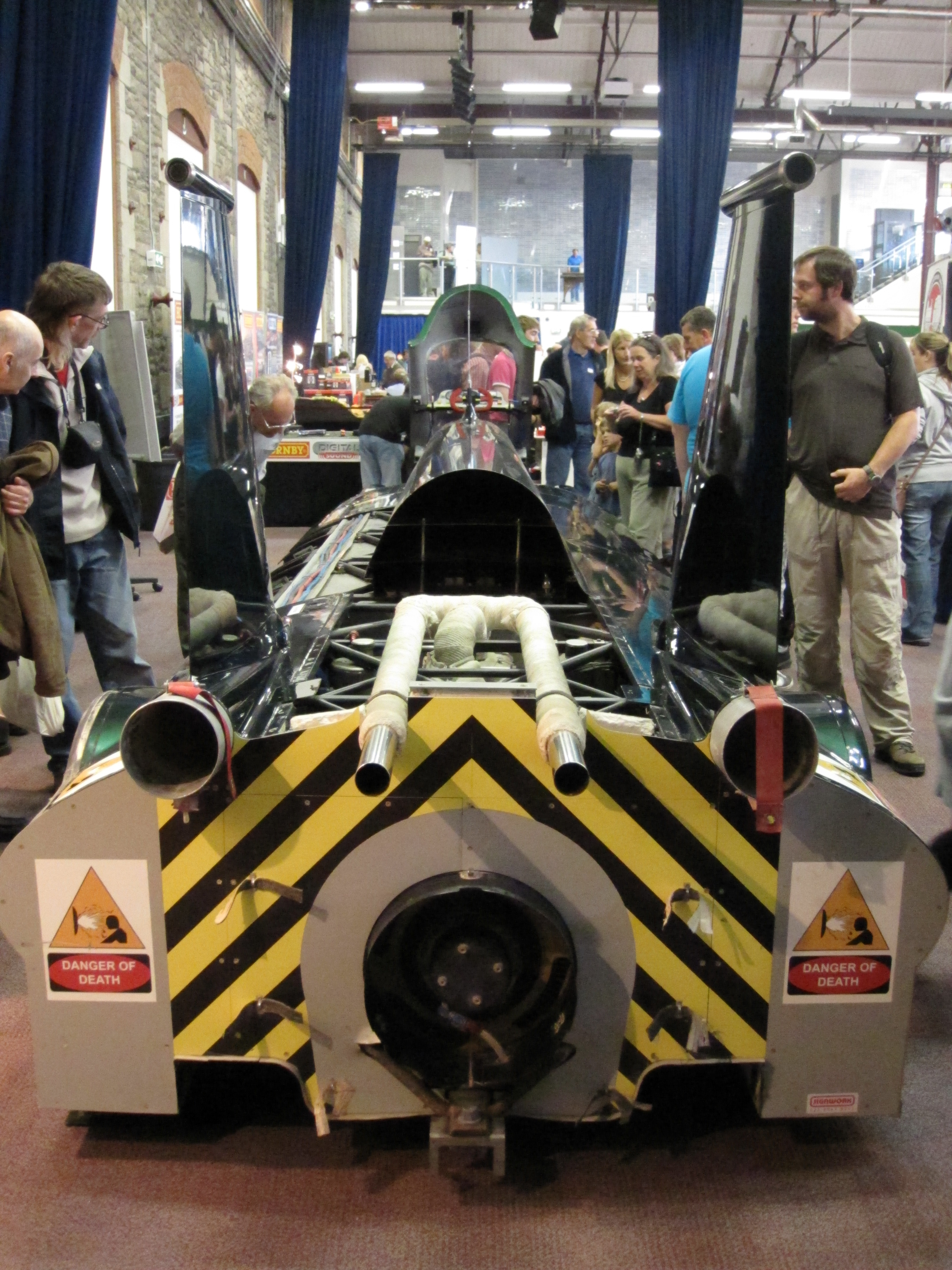

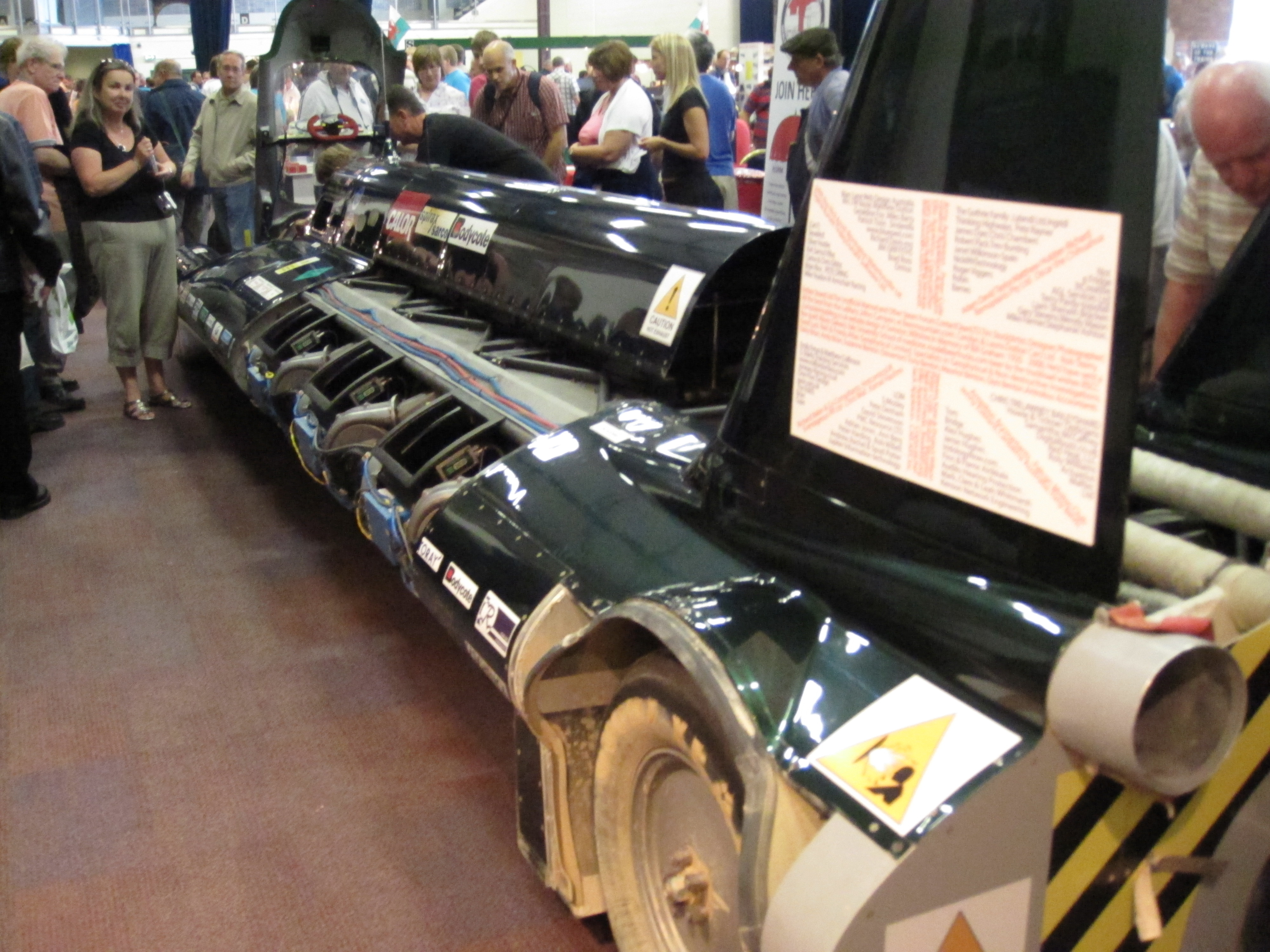

Inspiration running at Edwards Air Force Base
