= Monotube steam generator =

Water boiler

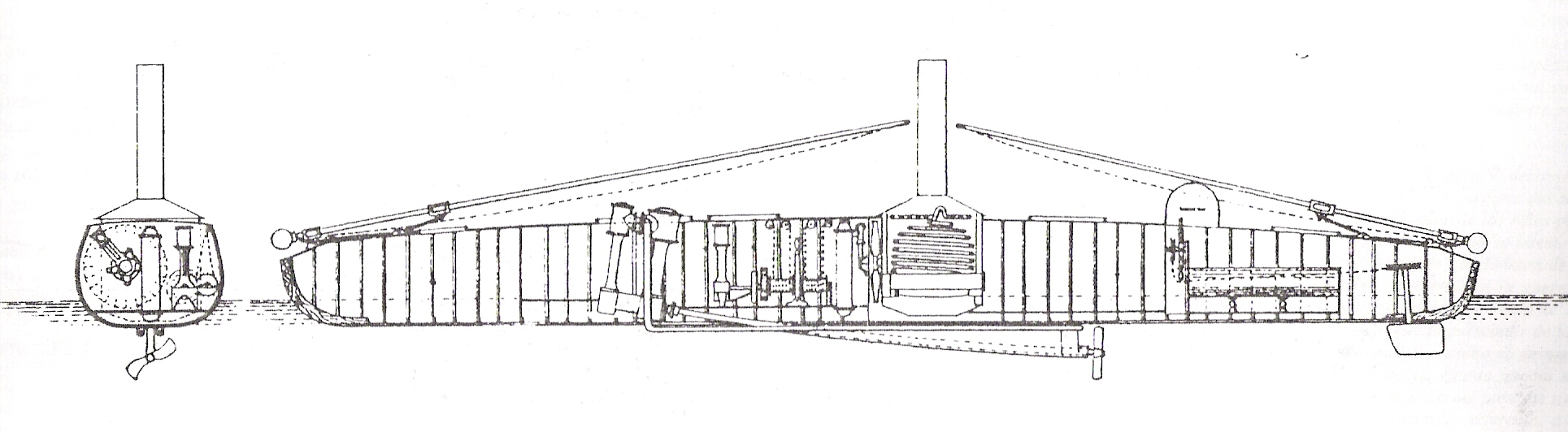
Herreshoff steam generator in a Peruvian torpedo boat of 1879

A monotube steam generator is a type of steam generator consisting of a single tube, usually in a multi-layer spiral, that forms a once-through steam generator (OTSG). The first of these was the Herreshoff steam generator of 1873.

== Principles ==
For the sake of efficiency, it is desirable to minimise the steam content of the generator. Heat can then be transferred efficiently into liquid water, rather than into low-density steam. Monotube steam generators may either boil gradually along their length, usually pumped circulation systems, but where this boiling does not disrupt the circulation. Otherwise they can use the Benson supercritical system, where the pressure is sufficient to prevent boiling (within the heated volume) altogether.

Modern monotube steam generators are often designed as once-through systems. In these systems water passes continuously through the tube and is converted to steam without the use of a steam drum. This design reduces the volume of water contained within the system and as such allows for rapid start-up times, improved thermal efficiency and reduced risk associated with high-pressure steam storage. As a result, monotube generators are commonly used in applications requiring flexible or intermittent steam demand.

== Examples ==
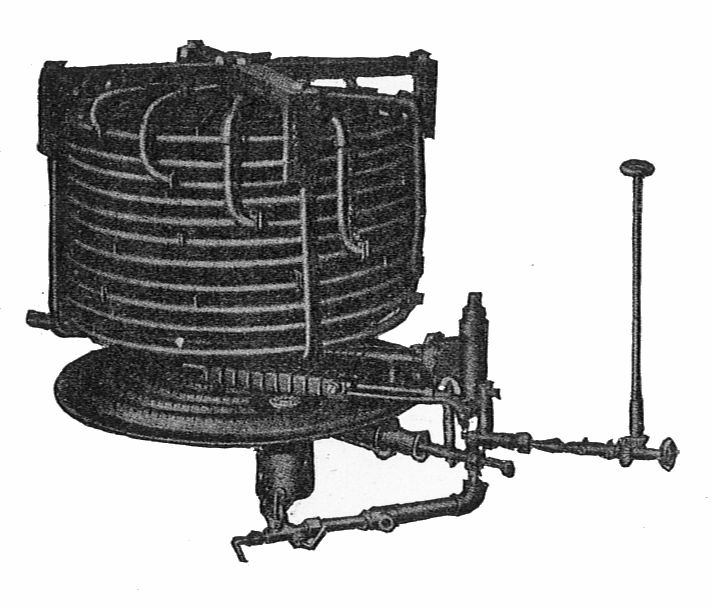
White steam car steam generator

Examples of Monotube steam generators include:

- Industrial steam generators such as the Clayton Steam Generator
- The water-tube boilers of the monotube type used in steam cars, such as:
  - AMC
  - Doble steam car
  - Gardner-Serpollet
  - Locomobile Company of America
  - White Motor Company, US patent 659,837 of 1900

== Industrial use ==
Monotube steam generators are widely used in industrial applications due to their compact design and ability to produce steam rapidly. They are commonly employed in sectors such as food processing, chemical production, oil and gas, and manufacturing where on-demand steam generation is required.

In contrast to traditional fire-tube or water-tube boilers with steam drums, monotube systems typically contain a smaller volume of water which can improve safety and allow for faster response to changing load conditions. Their once-through design also makes them suitable for integration with a waste heat recovery unit where heat from exhaust gases or industrial processes is used to generate steam.

Modern designs may incorporate forced circulation and high heat transfer rates to achieve high efficiency in relatively small footprints, making them suitable for decentralized or modular installations.

== Flash boilers ==
A flash boiler is a particular type of low-water-content monotube boiler. Modern use is confined to model steam boats but, historically, flash boilers were used in Gardner-Serpollet steam cars.

== See also ==
- List of boiler types, by manufacturer
- Steam generator (boiler)
- Steam generator (railroad)
