= Steam car =

Automobile powered by a steam engine

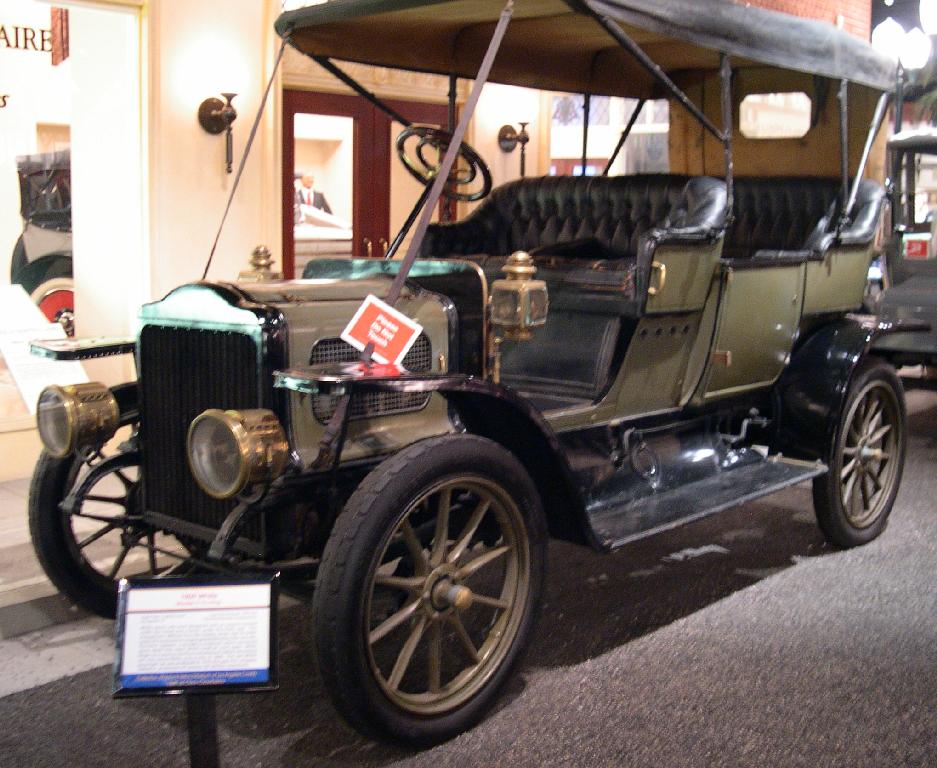
White steam touring car (1909)

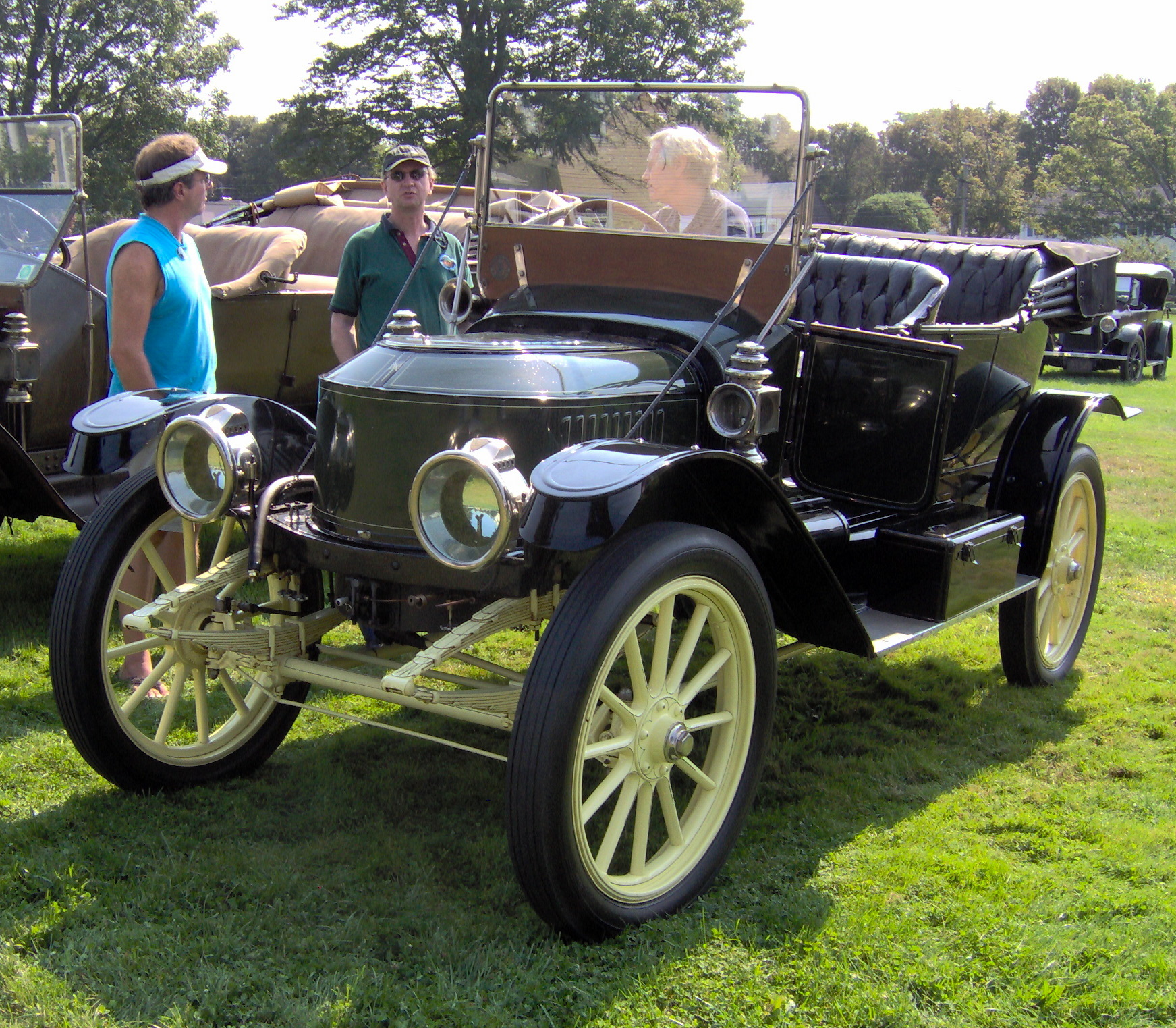
Stanley Steamer (1912)

steam car is a car (automobile) propelled by a steam engine. A steam engine is an external combustion engine (ECE), whereas the gasoline and diesel engines that eventually became standard are internal combustion engines (ICE). ECEs have a lower thermal efficiency, but carbon monoxide production is more readily regulated.

The first experimental steam-powered cars were built in the 18th and 19th centuries, but it was not until after Richard Trevithick developed the use of high-pressure steam around 1800 that mobile steam engines became a practical proposition. By the 1850s there was a flurry of new steam car manufacturers.

Development was hampered by adverse legislation (the UK Locomotive Acts from the 1860s) as well as the rapid development of internal combustion engine technology in the 1900s, leading to the commercial demise of steam-powered vehicles. Relatively few remained in use after the Second World War. Many of these vehicles were acquired by enthusiasts for preservation.

The search for renewable energy sources has led to an occasional resurgence of interest in using steam technology to power road vehicles.

== Technology ==
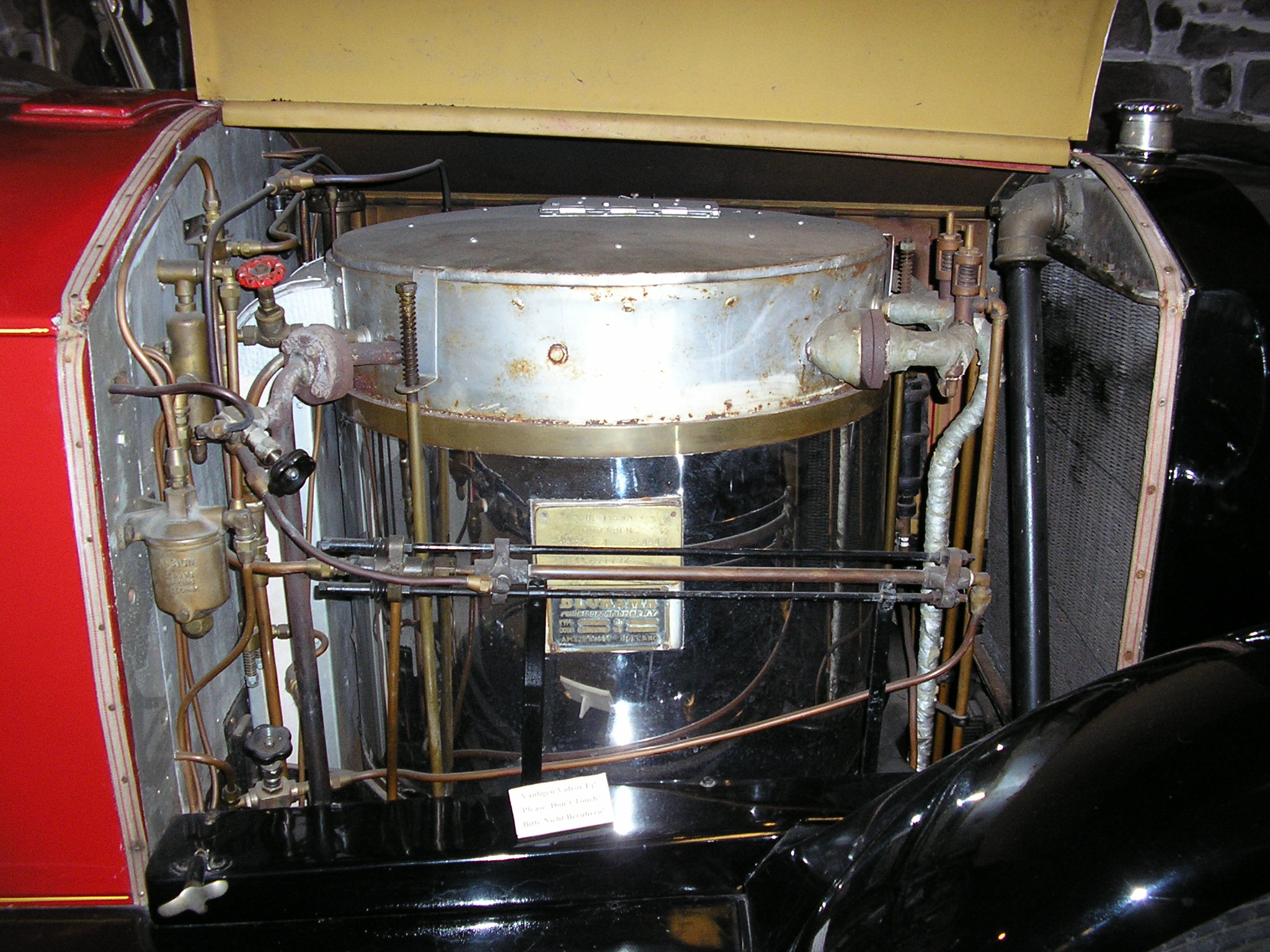
Boiler in a 1924 Stanley Steamer Series 740, to the right is the condenser

While gasoline-powered ICE cars have an operational thermal efficiency of 15% to 30%, early automotive steam units were capable of only about half this efficiency. A significant benefit of the ECE is that the fuel burner can be configured for very low emissions of carbon monoxide, nitrogen oxides and unburned carbon in the exhaust, thus avoiding pollution.

The greatest technical challenges to the steam car have focused on its boiler. This represents much of the total mass of the vehicle, making the car heavy (an internal combustion-engined car requires no boiler), and requires careful attention from the driver, although even the cars of 1900 had considerable automation to manage this. The single largest restriction is the need to supply feedwater to the boiler. This must either be carried and frequently replenished, or the car must also be fitted with a condenser, a further weight and inconvenience.

Steam-powered and electric cars outsold gasoline-powered cars in the United States prior to the invention of the electric starter, since internal combustion cars relied on a hand crank to start the engine, which was difficult and occasionally dangerous to use, as improper cranking could cause a backfire capable of breaking the arm of the operator. Electric cars were popular to some extent, but had a short range, and could not be charged on the road if the batteries ran low.

Once working pressure was attained, early steam cars could be instantly driven off with high acceleration, but they typically take several minutes to start from cold, plus time to get the burner to operating temperature. To overcome this, development has been directed toward flash boilers, which heat a much smaller quantity of water to get the vehicle started, and in the case of Doble cars, spark ignition kerosene burners.

The steam car does have advantages over internal combustion-powered cars, although most of these are now less important than in the early 20th century. The engine (excluding the boiler) is smaller and lighter than an internal combustion engine. It is also better-suited to the speed and torque characteristics of the axle, thus avoiding the need for the heavy and complex transmission required for an internal combustion engine. The steam car is also quieter, even without a silencer.

== History ==
=== Early history ===
Frank Hills' steam carriage, 1840

Amédée Bollée's La Mancelle of 1878 at Rétromobile, Paris, 2016

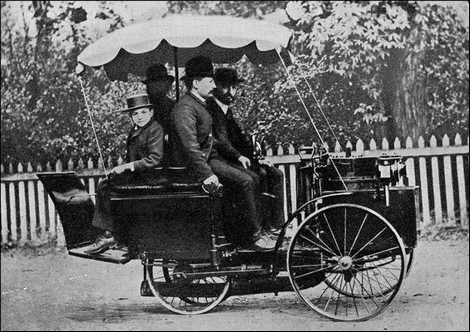
Georges Bouton driving De Dion, Bouton & Trépardoux's La Marquise of 1884

The first steam-powered vehicle was supposedly built in 1679 by Ferdinand Verbiest, a Flemish Jesuit in China. The vehicle was a toy for the Chinese Emperor. While not intended to carry passengers, if it was invented, Verbiest's device might have been the first ever engine powered vehicle. Also it seems that the Belgian vehicle served as an inspiration for the Italian Grimaldi (early 1700) and the French Nolet (1748) steam carriage successor. A French inventor, Nicolas-Joseph Cugnot, built the first working self-propelled land based mechanical vehicle in two versions, one in 1769 and one in 1771 for use by the French Army. William Murdoch built and operated a steam carriage in model form in 1784. In 1791 he built a larger steam carriage which he had to abandon to do other work. Also William Symington built a steam carriage in 1786. There is an unsubstantiated story that a pair of Yorkshiremen, engineer Robert Fourness and his cousin, physician James Ashworth had a steam car running in 1788, after being granted a British patent No.1674 of December 1788. An illustration of it even appeared in Hergé's book Tintin raconte l'histoire de l'automobile (Casterman, 1953). The London Steam Carriage was built by Richard Trevithick in 1803 and ran successfully in London, but the venture failed to attract interest and soon folded up. An amphibious steam car was built by Oliver Evans in 1805. The first substantiated steam car for personal use was that of Josef Božek in 1815. He was followed by Julius Griffith in 1821, Timothy Burstall and John Hill in 1824 and Thomas Blanchard in 1825. Over thirty years passed before there was a flurry of steam cars from 1850s onwards with Dudgeon, Roper and Spencer from the United States, Leonard and Taylor from Canada, Rickett, Austin, Catley and Ayres from England, Bordino and Manzetti from Italy, others followed with Bollée and Lejeune from France, Thury from Switzerland and Kemna from Germany.

This early period also saw the first repossession of an automobile in 1867 and the first getaway car the same year, both by Francis Curtis of Newburyport, Massachusetts.

The 1880s saw the rise of the first larger scale manufacturers, particularly in France, the first being Amédée Bollée (1878) followed by De Dion-Bouton (1883), Whitney (1885), Olds (1886), Serpollet (1887) and Peugeot (1889). Amédée Bollée's La Mancelle of 1878 was the first production car, some 50 examples being manufactured between 1878 and 1881.

=== 1890s Commercial Manufacture ===
Léon Serpollet and his wife in a Gardner-Serpollet, Sainte-Barbe-sur-Gaillon, France, 1900

The 1890s were dominated by the formation of numerous car manufacturing companies. The internal combustion engine was in its infancy, whereas steam power was well established. Léon Serpollet and his brother Henri made a major advance with the development of the flash boiler, reducing the time required to raise sufficient steam to get moving. From 1898 they were supported by Frank Gardner, a wealthy American, and produced cars as Gardner-Serpollet. Electric powered cars were becoming available but their limited range restricted them to being used as town cars.

The majority of steam-powered car manufacturers from this period were from the United States. The more notable of these were Clark from 1895 to 1909, Locomobile from 1899 to 1903 when it switched to gasoline engines, and Stanley from 1897 to 1924. As well as England and France, other countries also made attempts to manufacture steam cars: Cederholm of Sweden (1892), Malevez of Belgium (1898–1905), Schöche of Germany (1895), and Herbert Thomson of Australia (1896–1901).

Of all the new manufacturers from the 1890s, only four continued to make steam cars after 1910. They were Stanley (to 1924) and Waverley (to 1916) of the United States, Buard of France (to 1914), and Miesse of Belgium (to 1926).

=== Volume Production 1900 to 1913 ===
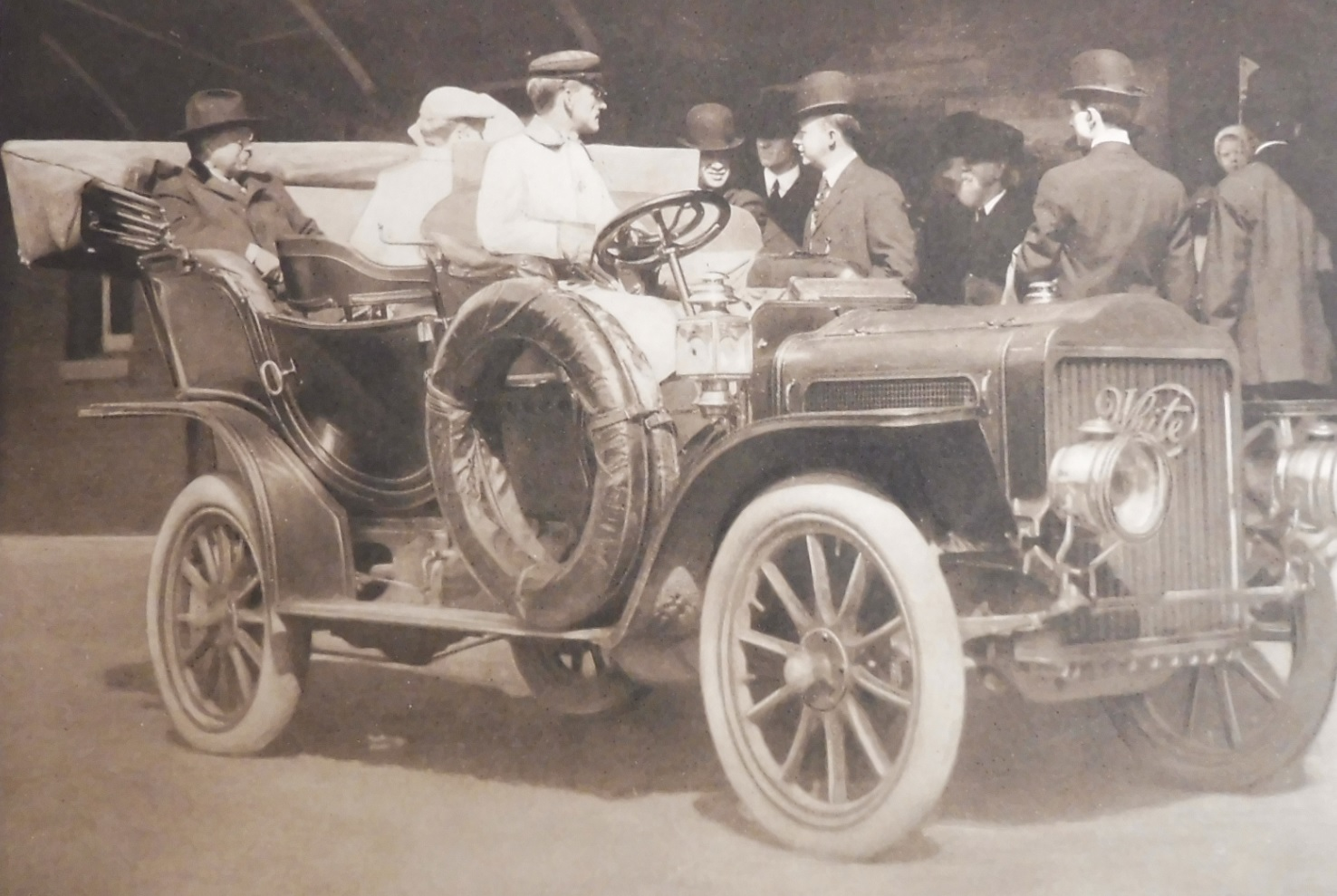
Theodore Roosevelt in a US Government 30 hp White steam car, c.1907

There were a large number of new companies formed in the period from 1898 to 1905. Steam cars outnumbered other forms of propulsion among very early cars. In the U.S. in 1902, 485 of 909 new car registrations were steamers. From 1899, Mobile had ten branches and 58 dealers across the U.S. The center of U.S. steamer production was New England, where 38 of the 84 manufacturers were located. Examples include White (Cleveland), Eclipse (Easton, Massachusetts), Cotta (Lanark, Illinois), Crouch (New Brighton, Pennsylvania), Hood (Danvers, Massachusetts, lasted just one month), Kidder (New Haven, Connecticut), Century (Syracuse, New York) and Skene (Lewiston, Maine, the company built everything but the tires). By 1903, 43 of them were gone and by the end of 1910 of those companies that were started in the decade those left were White which lasted to 1911, Conrad which lasted to 1924, Turner-Miesse of England which lasted to 1913, Morriss to 1912, Doble to 1930, Rutherford to 1912, and Pearson-Cox to 1916.

Assembly line mass production by Henry Ford dramatically reduced the cost of owning a conventional automobile, was also a strong factor in the steam car's demise as the Model T was both cheap and reliable. Additionally, during the 'heyday' of steam cars, the internal combustion engine made steady gains in efficiency, matching and then surpassing the efficiency of a steam engine when the weight of a boiler is factored in.

=== Decline 1914 to 1939 ===
With the introduction of the electric starter, the internal combustion engine became more popular than steam, but the internal combustion engine was not necessarily superior in performance, range, fuel economy and emissions. Some steam enthusiasts feel steam has not received its share of attention in the field of automobile efficiency.

Apart from Brooks of Canada, all the steam car manufacturers that commenced between 1916 and 1926 were in the United States. Endurance (1924–1925) was the last steam car manufacturer to commence operations. American/Derr continued retrofitting production cars of various makes with steam engines, and Doble was the last steam car manufacturer. It ceased business in 1930.

=== Air Pollution, Fuel Crises, Resurgence and Enthusiasts ===
From the 1940s onward, various steam cars were constructed, usually by enthusiasts. Among those mentioned were Charles Keen, Cal Williams' 1950 Ford Conversion, Forrest R Detrick's 1957 Detrick S-101 prototype, and Harry Peterson's Stanley powered Peterson. The Detrick was constructed by Detrick, William H Mehrling, and Lee Gaeke who designed the engine based on a Stanley.

Charles Keen began constructing a steam car in 1940 with the intention of restarting steam car manufacturing. Keen's family had a long history of involvement with steam propulsion going back to his great-great-grandfather in the 1830s, who helped build early steam locomotives. His first car, a Plymouth Coupe, used a Stanley engine. In 1948 and 1949, Keen employed Abner Doble to create a more powerful steam engine, a V4. He used this in La Dawri Victress S4 bodied sports car. Both these cars are still in existence. Keen died in 1969 before completing a further car. His papers and patterns were destroyed at that time.

In the 1950s, the only manufacturer to investigate steam cars was Paxton. Abner Doble developed the Doble Ultimax engine for the Paxton Phoenix steam car, built by the Paxton Engineering Division of McCulloch Motors Corporation, Los Angeles. The engine's sustained maximum power was 120 bhp (89 kW). A Ford Coupe was used as a test-bed for the engine. The project was eventually dropped in 1954.

In 1957, Williams Engine Company Incorporated of Ambler began offering steam engine conversions for existing production cars. When air pollution became a significant issue for California in the mid-1960s the state encouraged investigation into the use of steam-powered cars. The fuel crises of the early 1970s prompted further work. None of this resulted in renewed steam car manufacturing.

Steam cars remain the domain of enthusiasts, occasional experimentation by manufacturers, and those wishing to establish steam-powered land speed records.

==== Impact of Californian legislation ====
In 1967, California established the California Air Resources Board and began to implement legislation to dramatically reduce exhaust emissions. This prompted renewed interest in alternative fuels for motor vehicles and a resurgence of interest in steam-powered cars in the state.

The idea for having patrol cars fitted with steam engines stemmed from an informal meeting in March 1968 of members of the California Assembly Transportation Committee. In the discussion, Karsten Vieg, a lawyer attached to the committee, suggested that six cars be fitted with steam engines for testing by California District Police Chiefs. A bill was passed by the legislature to fund the trial.

In 1969, the California Highway Patrol initiated the project under Inspector David S. Luethje to investigate the feasibility of using steam engined cars. Initially General Motors had agreed to pay a selected vendor $20,000 ($193,114 in 2025 dollars) toward the cost of developing a Rankine cycle engine, and up to $100,000 ($965,569 in 2025 dollars) for outfitting six Oldsmobile Delmont 88s as operational patrol vehicles. This deal fell through because the engine manufacturers rejected GM's offer.

The plan was revised and two 1969 Dodge Polaras were to be retrofitted with steam engines for testing. One car was to be modified by Don Johnson of Thermodynamic Systems Inc. and the other by industrialist William P. Lear's Lear Motors Incorporated. At the time, the California State Legislature was introducing strict pollution control regulations for automobiles and the Chair of the Assembly Transportation Committee, John Francis Foran, was supportive of the idea. The committee also was proposing to test four steam-powered buses in the San Francisco Bay Area that year.

Instead of a Polara, Thermodynamic Systems (later called General Steam Corp), was given a late-model Oldsmobile Delmont 88. Lear was given a Polara but it does not appear to have been built. Both firms were given 6 months to complete their projects with Lear's being due for completion on August 1, 1969. Neither car had been completed by the due date and in November 1969, Lear was reported as saying the car would be ready in 3 months. Lear's only known retrofit was a Chevrolet Monte Carlo unrelated to the project. As for the project, it seems to have never been completed, with Lear pulling out by December.

In 1969, the National Air Pollution Control Administration announced a competition for a contract to design a practical passenger-car steam engine. Five firms entered. They were the consortium of Planning Research Corporation and STP Corporation, Battelle Memorial Institute, Columbus, Ohio, Continental Motors Corporation, Detroit, Vought Aeronautical Division of Ling-Temco-Vought, Dallas and Thermo Electron Corporation, Waltham, Massachusetts.

General Motors introduced two experimental steam-powered cars in 1969. One was the SE 124 based on a converted Chevrolet Chevelle and the other was designated SE 101 based on the Pontiac Grand Prix. The SE 124 had its standard gasoline engine replaced with a 50 hp Besler steam engine V4, using the 1920 Doble patents, the SE 101 was fitted with a 160 hp steam engine developed by GM Engineering. Power was transferred via a Toric automatic gearbox. The results was disappointing. The steam engine was heavy and weighted 300 kg more than a standard V8 and gave about half the power.

In October 1969, the Massachusetts Institute of Technology and the California Institute of Technology put out a challenge for a race August 1970 from Cambridge, Massachusetts to Pasadena, California for any college that wanted to participate in. The race was open for electric, steam, turbine power, and internal combustion engines: liquid-fueled, gaseous-fueled engines, and hybrids. Two steam-powered cars entered the race. University of California, San Diego's modified AMC Javelin and Worcester Polytechnic Institute's converted 1970 Chevrolet Chevelle called the tea kettle. Both dropped out on the second day of the race.

The California Assembly passed legislation in 1972 to contract two companies to develop steam-powered cars. They were Aerojet Liquid Rocket Company of Sacramento and Steam Power Systems of San Diego. Aerojet installed a steam turbine into a Chevrolet Vega, while Steam Power Systems built the Dutcher, a car named after the company's founder, Cornelius Dutcher. Both cars were tested by 1974 but neither car went into production. The Dutcher is on display at the Petersen Automotive Museum in Los Angeles.

==== Indy Cars ====
Both Johnson and Lear had contemplated constructing steam-powered cars for the Indianapolis 500, Johnson first in the early 1960s when with Controlled Steam Dynamics and in 1968 with Thermodynamic Systems and Lear in 1969. A third steam racing car was contemplated by a consortium of Planning Research Corporation and Andy Granatelli of STP Corporation. Lear proceeded with the idea and constructed a car, but ran out of funds while trying to develop the engine. The car is thought to be at the National Automobile and Truck Museum of the United States in Auburn, Indiana. Johnson was also noted as working on a steam-powered helicopter.

William D Thompson, 69-year-old retired San Diego automotive engineer, also announced he planned to enter a steam-powered race car. Thompson was working on a $35,000 ($307,282 in 2025 dollars) steam-powered luxury car and he intended to use the car's engine in the race car. He had claimed that he had almost 250 orders for his cars. By comparison, Rolls-Royces cost about $17,000 ($149,251 in 2025 dollars) at that time.

==== Donald Healey Steam Car ====
With Lear pulling out of attempting to make a steam car, Donald Healey decided to make a basic steam car technology more in line with Stanley or Doble and aimed at enthusiasts. He planned to have the car in production by 1971.

==== Ted Pritchard's Falcon Steam Car ====
Edward Pritchard created a steam-powered 1963 model Ford Falcon in 1972. It was evaluated by the Australian Federal Government and was also taken to the United States for promotional purposes.

==== Saab Steam Car and Ranotor ====
As a result of the 1973 oil crisis, SAAB started a project in 1974 codenamed ULF (short for utan luftföroreningar, Swedish for Without Air Pollution) headed by Dr. Ove Platell which made a prototype steam-powered car. The engine used an electronically controlled 28-pound multi-parallel-circuit steam generator with 1-millimeter-bore tubing and 16 gallons per hour (61 L/h) firing rate which was intended to produce 160 hp (119 kW) of continuous power, and was about the same size as a standard car battery. Lengthy start-up times were avoided by using air compressed and stored when the car was running to power the car upon starting until adequate steam pressure was built up. The engine used a conical rotary valve made from pure boron nitride. To conserve water, a hermetically sealed water system was used.

The project was cancelled and the project engineer, Ove Platell, started a company named Ranotor, with his son Peter Platell to continue its development. Ranotor is developing a steam hybrid that uses the exhaust heat from an ordinary petrol engine to power a small steam engine, with the aim of reducing fuel consumption by 20%. In 2008, truck manufacturers Scania and Volvo were said to be interested in the project.

==== Pelland Steamer ====
In 1974, the British designer Peter Pellandine produced the first Pelland Steamer for a contract with the South Australian Government. It had a fibreglass monocoque chassis (based on the internal combustion-engined Pelland Sports) and used a parallel twin cylinder double acting compound engine. It has been preserved at the National Motor Museum at Birdwood, South Australia.

In 1979, the Pelland Mk II Steam Car was built, this time by Pelland Engineering in the UK. It had a three-cylinder double-acting engine in a 'broad-arrow' configuration, mounted in a tubular steel chassis with a Kevlar body, giving a gross weight of just 1,050 lb (476 kg). Uncomplicated and robust, the steam engine was claimed to give trouble-free, efficient performance. It had huge torque (1,100 ft⋅lbf or 1,500 N⋅m) at zero engine revs, and could accelerate from 0 to 60 mph (0 to 97 km/h) in under 8 seconds.

Pellandine made several attempts to break the land speed record for steam power, but was thwarted by technical issues. Pellandine moved back to Australia in early 1991 where he continued to develop the Steamer in Tasmania. The latest version is the Mark IV.

==== Enginion Steamcell ====
From 1996, a R&D subsidiary of the Volkswagen group called Enginion AG was developing a system called ZEE (Zero Emissions Engine). It produced steam almost instantly without an open flame, and took 30 seconds to reach maximum power from a cold start. Their third prototype, EZEE03, was a three-cylinder unit meant to fit in a Škoda Fabia automobile. The EZEE03 was described as having a "two-stroke" (i.e. single-acting) engine of 1,000 cc (61 cu in) displacement, producing up to 220 hp (164 kW) (500 N⋅m or 369 ft⋅lbf). Exhaust emissions were said to be far below the SULEV standard. It had an oilless engine with ceramic cylinder linings using steam instead of oil as a lubricant. However, Enginion found that the market was not ready for steam cars, so they opted instead to develop the Steamcell power generator/heating system based on similar technology.

== Notable manufacturers ==
=== Cederholm steam car ===
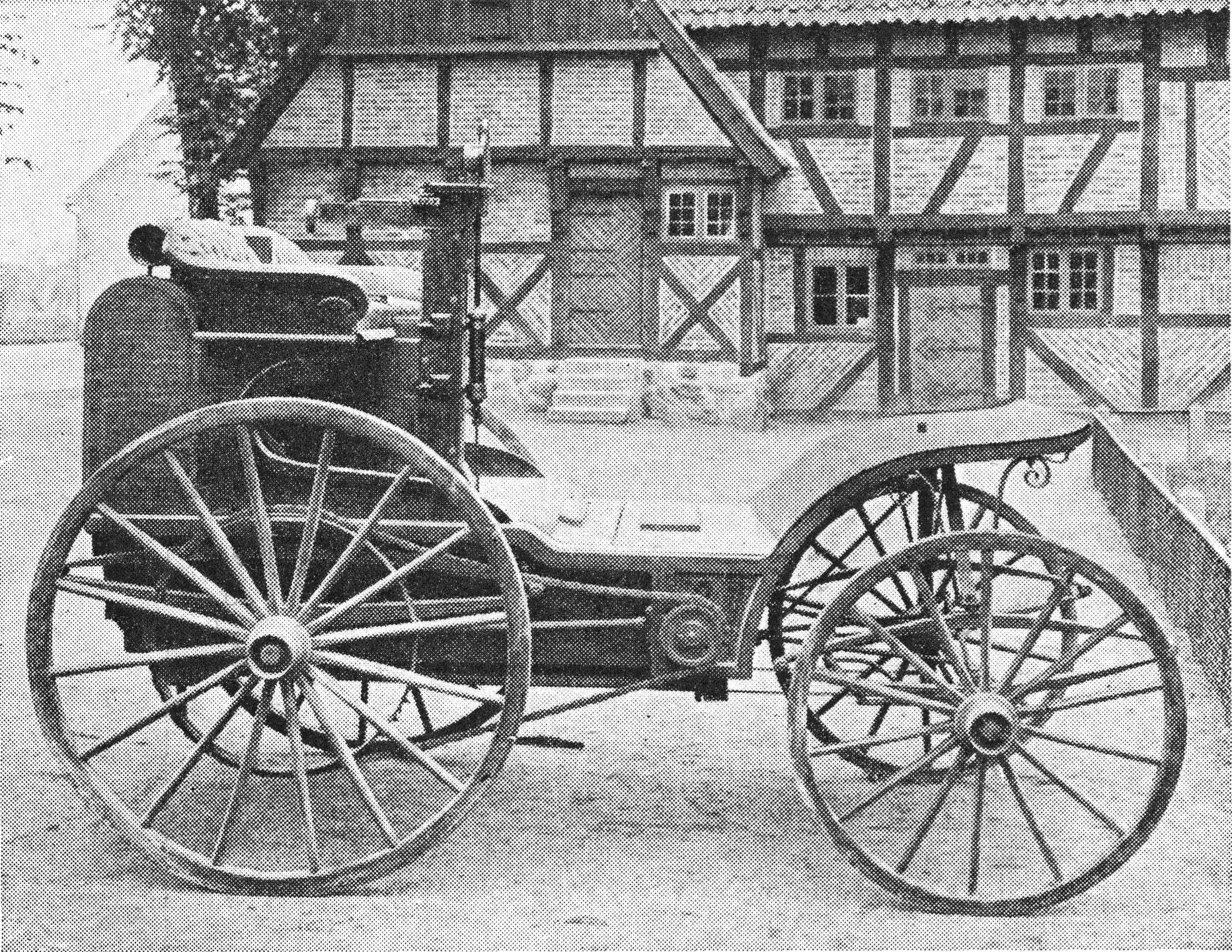
Cederholm #2 built in 1894

In 1892, painter Jöns Cederholm and his brother, André, a blacksmith, designed their first steam car, a two-seater, introducing a condenser in 1894. They planned to use it for transportation between their home in Ystad and their summer house outside town. Unfortunately the automobile was destroyed in Sweden's first automobile accident but the Cederholm brothers soon built a second, improved version of their steam car reusing many parts from the first one. The car is preserved in a museum in Skurup.

=== Locomobile Runabout ===
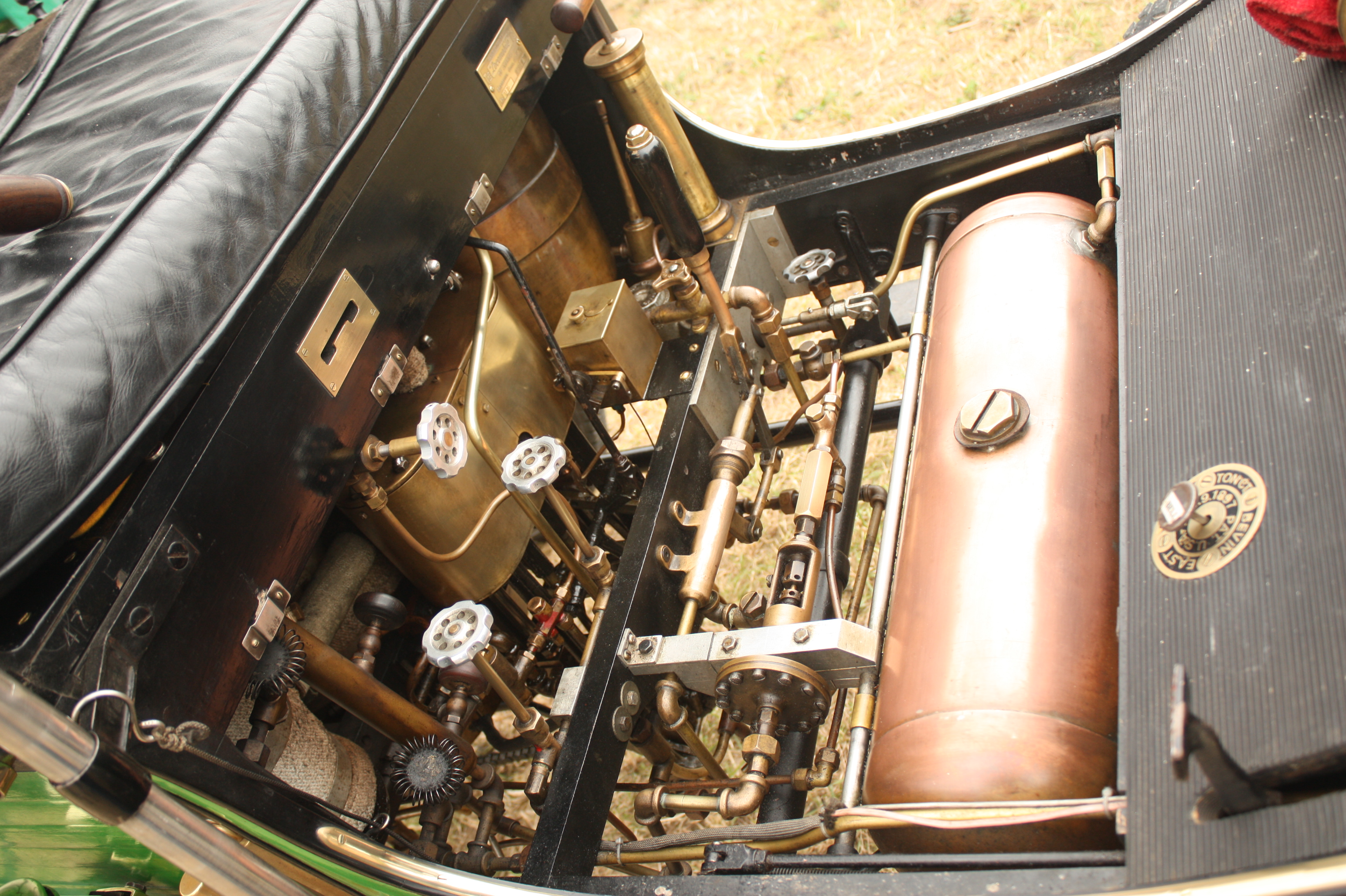
The engine of a Locomobile Steam car

What is considered by many to be the first marketable popular steam car appeared in 1899 from the Locomobile Company of America, located in Watertown, Massachusetts, and from 1900 in Bridgeport, Connecticut. Locomobile manufactured several thousand of its Runabout model in the period 1899–1903, designed around a motor design leased from the Stanley Steamer Company. The company ceased producing steam cars in 1903 and changed to limited-production, internal combustion powered luxury automobiles. In 1922, it was acquired by Durant Motors and discontinued with the failure of the parent company in 1929.

=== Stanley Steamer ===
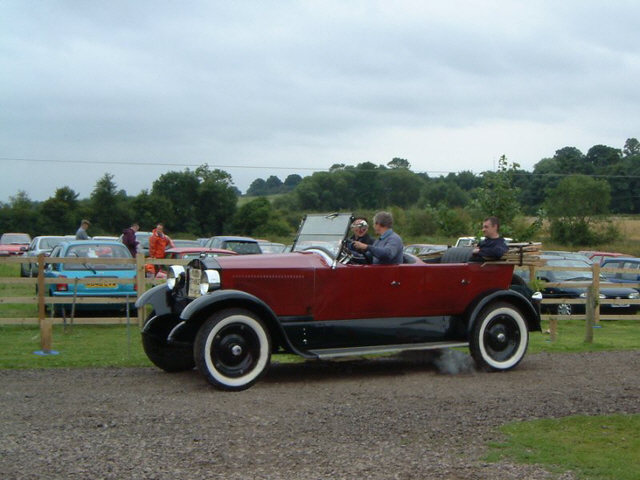
Stanley steam car (1923)

Perhaps the best selling and best known steam car was the Stanley Steamer, produced from 1896 to 1924. Between 1899 and 1905, Stanley outsold all gasoline-powered cars and was second only to the electric cars of the Columbia Automobile Company in the U.S. It used a compact fire-tube boiler to power a simple double acting two cylinder engine. Because of the phenomenal torque available at all engine speeds, the steam car's engine was typically geared directly to the rear axle, with no clutch or variable speed transmission required. Until 1914, Stanley steam cars vented their exhaust steam directly to the atmosphere, necessitating frequent refilling of the water tank; after 1914, all Stanleys were fitted with a condenser, which considerably reduced their water consumption.

In 1906, the Land Speed Record was broken by a Stanley steam car, piloted by Fred Marriott, which achieved 127 mph (204 km/h) at Ormond Beach, Florida. This annual week-long "Speed Week" is still run, headed by the Daytona 500 stock car race This record was not exceeded by any car until 1910.

=== Doble Steam car ===
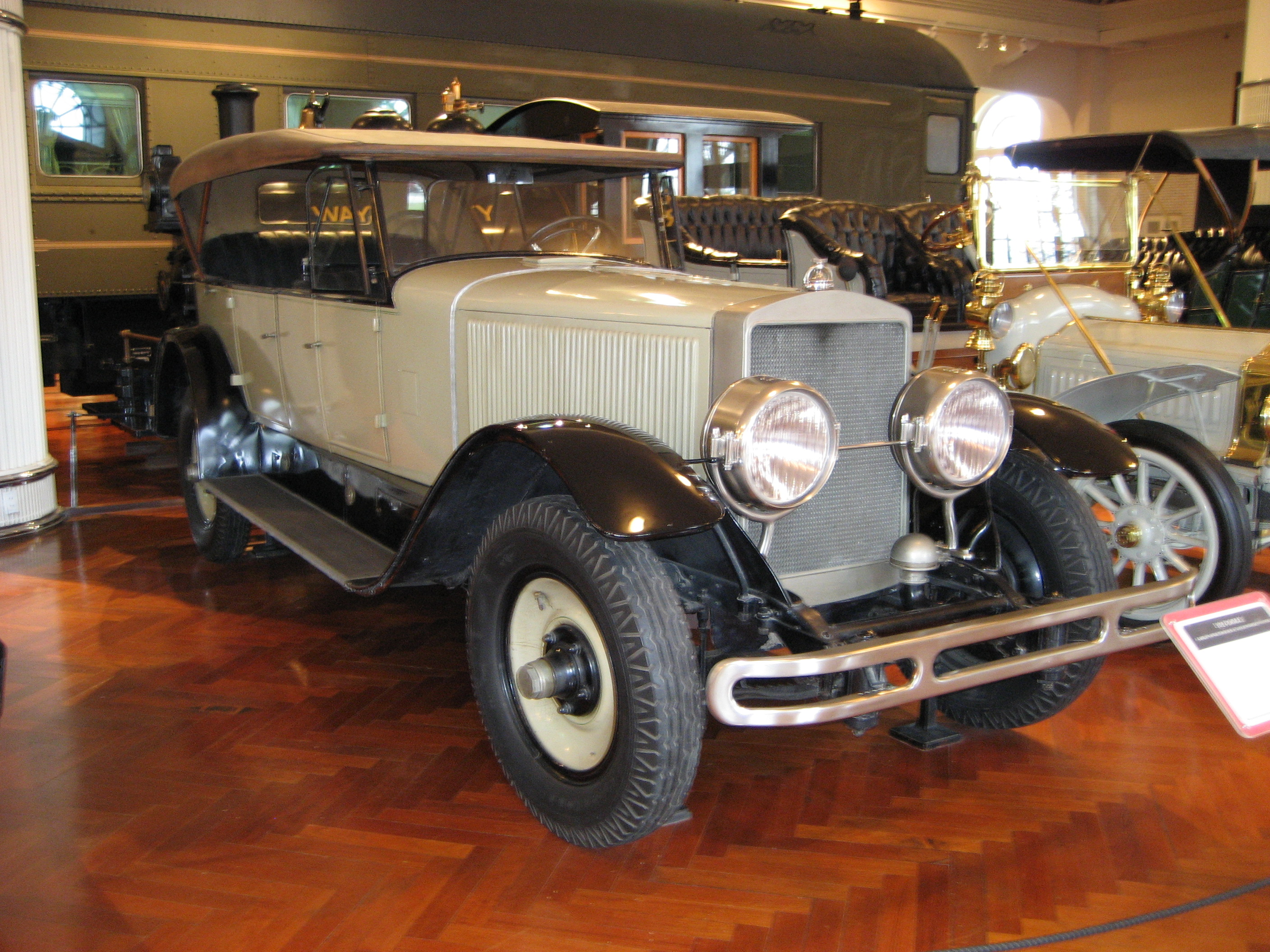
1924 Doble Model E steam car

Attempts were made to bring more advanced steam cars on the market, the most remarkable being the Doble Steam Car which shortened start-up time very noticeably by incorporating a highly efficient monotube steam generator to heat a much smaller quantity of water along with effective automation of burner and water feed control. By 1923, Doble's steam cars could be started from cold with the turn of a key and driven off in 40 seconds or less. When the boiler had achieved maximum working pressure, the burner would cut out until pressure had fallen to a minimum level, whereupon it would reignite; by this means the car could achieve around 15 miles per gallon (18.8 liters/100 km) of kerosene despite its weight in excess of 5,000 lb (2,268 kg). Ultimately, despite their undoubted qualities, Doble cars failed due to poor company organization and high initial cost.

=== Toledo steam car ===
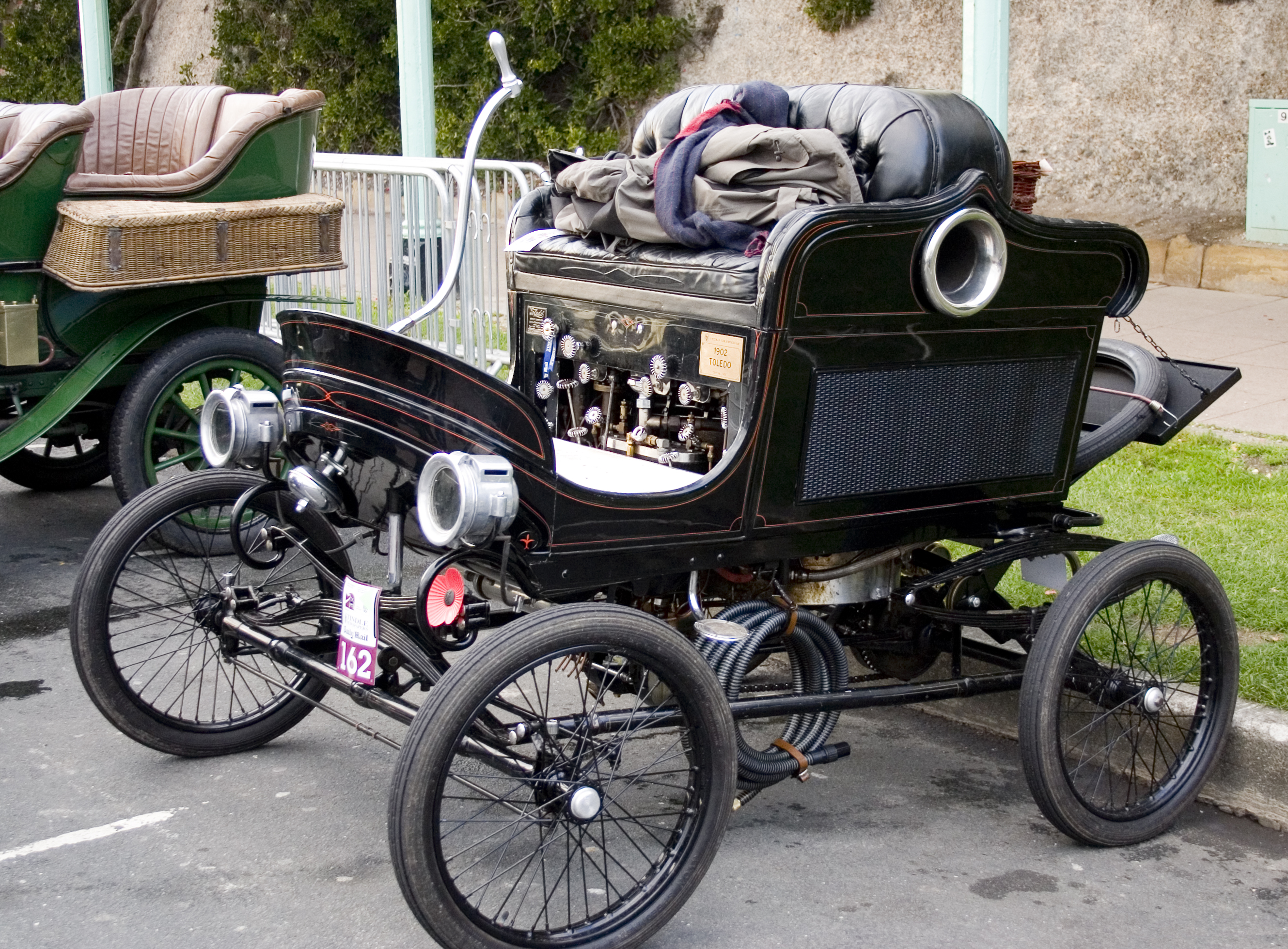
1902 Toledo steam car

In 1900, the American Bicycle Co. of Toledo, Ohio, created a 6.25 hp Toledo steam carriage (a description from the Horseless age, December 1900). The American Bicycle Co was one of the enterprises within Col. Albert Pope's large conglomerate of bicycle and motor vehicles manufacturers. The Toledo Steam carriage was a very well-made, high-quality machine where every component, bar the tires, bell, instruments and lights were made within the dedicated 245,000 sq ft factory in Toledo, Ohio. The Toledo is considered to be one of the best steam cars produced at the time. The engine was particularly robust and the 2, 3" diameter x 4" stroke pistons employed piston style valves instead of 'D' valves thus insuring better balance and reduced leakage of steam. In September 1901 two Toledo steamers, one model B (a model A machine 1,000 to 2,000 pounds or 454 to 907 kilograms but with the foul-weather gear designating it as a model B) and one class E (public delivery vehicle), were entered by the American Bicycle Co. into the New York to Buffalo Endurance Contest of mid-September 1901. There were 36 cars in class B and three in class E, the class B Toledo won the Grosse Point race. On 4 January 1902, a specially built Toledo steam carriage was the first automobile to forge a trail from Flagstaff, Arizona to the South Rim of The Grand Canyon, a distance of 67 miles. As a publicity exercise the trip was to assess the potential of starting a steam bus service but the anticipated afternoon journey took three days due to problems with supplies of the wrong fuel. Though the Toledo towed a trailer filled with additional fuel and water supplies, the four participants omitted to take any food, one, the journalist Winfield Hoggaboon, wrote up an amusing article in the Los Angeles Herald two weeks later. In December 1901, the company changed from the American Bicycle Company to the newly formed International Motor Car Company to concentrate on steam- and gasoline-driven models, with electric vehicles being made by the separate Waverly Electric Co. Both steam and gasoline models were manufactured, but, as the public favored the gasoline models and steam carriage sales were slow, steam carriage production ceased in July 1902 and gasoline-driven models were then made under the name Pope-Toledo. Total production of the steamers was between 285 and 325 units, as confirmed by a letter from the International Motor Car Co bookkeeper to the firms' accountant in June 1902.

=== White Steamer ===
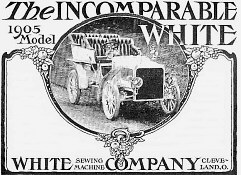
Advertisement for the White Sewing Machine Company's 1905 model

The White Steamer was manufactured in Cleveland, Ohio, from 1900 until 1910 by the White Motor Company.

=== Endurance Steam car ===
The Endurance Steam car was a steam car manufactured in the United States from 1922 until 1924. The company had its origins in the Coats Steam Car and began production on the East Coast before shifting operations to Los Angeles in 1924. There, one single touring car was made using a 1923 Elcar 6-60 body before the factory moved again, this time to Dayton, Ohio, where one more car was built, a sedan, before the company folded.

== Land speed record attempts ==
=== Autocoast Vaporizer ===
In the fall of 1968, Ernest Kanzler, the owner of Autocoast, approached Ross(Skip) Hedrich with an ambitious project: to install a steam engine in Hedrich's 1964 Indy car in hopes of breaking the steam car speed record set in 1906. Hedrich took the lead on the project, while Richard J. Smith provided expertise on the engine and steam generator system for Autocoast.

The team aimed to debut the car at the 1969 Bonneville Speed Week. However, the vehicle ended up being too heavy and wide for the steam engine's capabilities. As fate would have it, an unexpected rainstorm rendered the salt flats too soggy for racing, providing an unintentional but convenient excuse for the delay.

=== Barber-Nichols Engineering ===
In 1985, Barber-Nicholas Engineering from Denver set out to break the steam-powered land speed record using a steam turbine they had developed for Lear and the Los Angeles city bus program. Over several years at Bonneville Speed Week, they managed to achieve a measured speed of 145.607 mph during one run on the Bonneville Salt Flats . Unfortunately, a fire prevented them from making the required return run. As a result, the Fédération Internationale de l'Automobile (FIA) did not recognize the speed, as FIA regulations require an average of two runs in opposite directions within an hour of each other, a standard that differs from the original record set by Stanley.

=== British Steam Car Challenge ===
On August 25, 2009, Team Inspiration of the British Steam Car Challenge set a new record for steam vehicles, surpassing the long-held record established by a Stanley Steamer in 1906. The team achieved a speed of 139.843 mph (225.055 km/h) at Edwards Air Force Base in California's Mojave Desert. Charles Burnett III drove the car, reaching a maximum speed of 136.103 mph(219.037 km/h) on his first run, followed by an impressive 151.085 mph(243.148 km/h) on the second run, surpassing all previous single-run records. The following day, August 26, the same vehicle, driven by Don Wales-grandson of Sir Malcolm Campbell-averaged 148.308 mph(238.679 km/h) over two consecutive runs over a kilometer. Although Wales surpassed the mile record, he deferred that achievement to Burnett. This performance was officially recorded and later rectified by the FIA.

=== Steam Speed America ===
On September 6, 2014, Chuk Williams of Steam Speed America made an attempt to break the world record with their steam-powered streamliner. During the first run, the car reached a speed of 147 mph(236.57 km/h). However, the attempt ended in disaster when the braking chutes failed to deploy, causing the vehicle to flip and crash. Williams sustained injuries in the accident, and the car was left severely damaged.

== See also ==
- Brooks Steam Motors
- Gardner-Serpollet
- History of the automobile
- Timeline of motor vehicle brands
- Traction engine
- Steam bus
- Steam wagon
- Lifu (Steam car, 1899–1902)
