= Steam generator (auxiliary boiler) =

A steam generator on a ship is an auxiliary boiler which draws high-pressure superheated steam from the vessel's propulsion system to generate low pressure saturated steam. This secondary steam is then used to power auxiliary shipboard engines driving winches or pumps, or to meet any steam requirement that does not require superheating, such as boiler feedwater and freshwater evaporators.

== Types ==
=== Low-pressure steam generators ===
A typical generator uses inlet steam supplied at 600 psi to produce around 10,000 lb/hour at around 120 psi. It is constructed as a cylindrical steel pressure vessel, either horizontal or vertical, containing a series of heating coils. The design bears a strong resemblance to a marine evaporator, though simpler, as it uses treated feedwater, rather than scale-producing raw seawater.
