= Gardner-Serpollet =

French automobile manufacturer

Léon Serpollet and his wife in a Gardner-Serpollet, Sainte-Barbe-sur-Gaillon, France, 1900

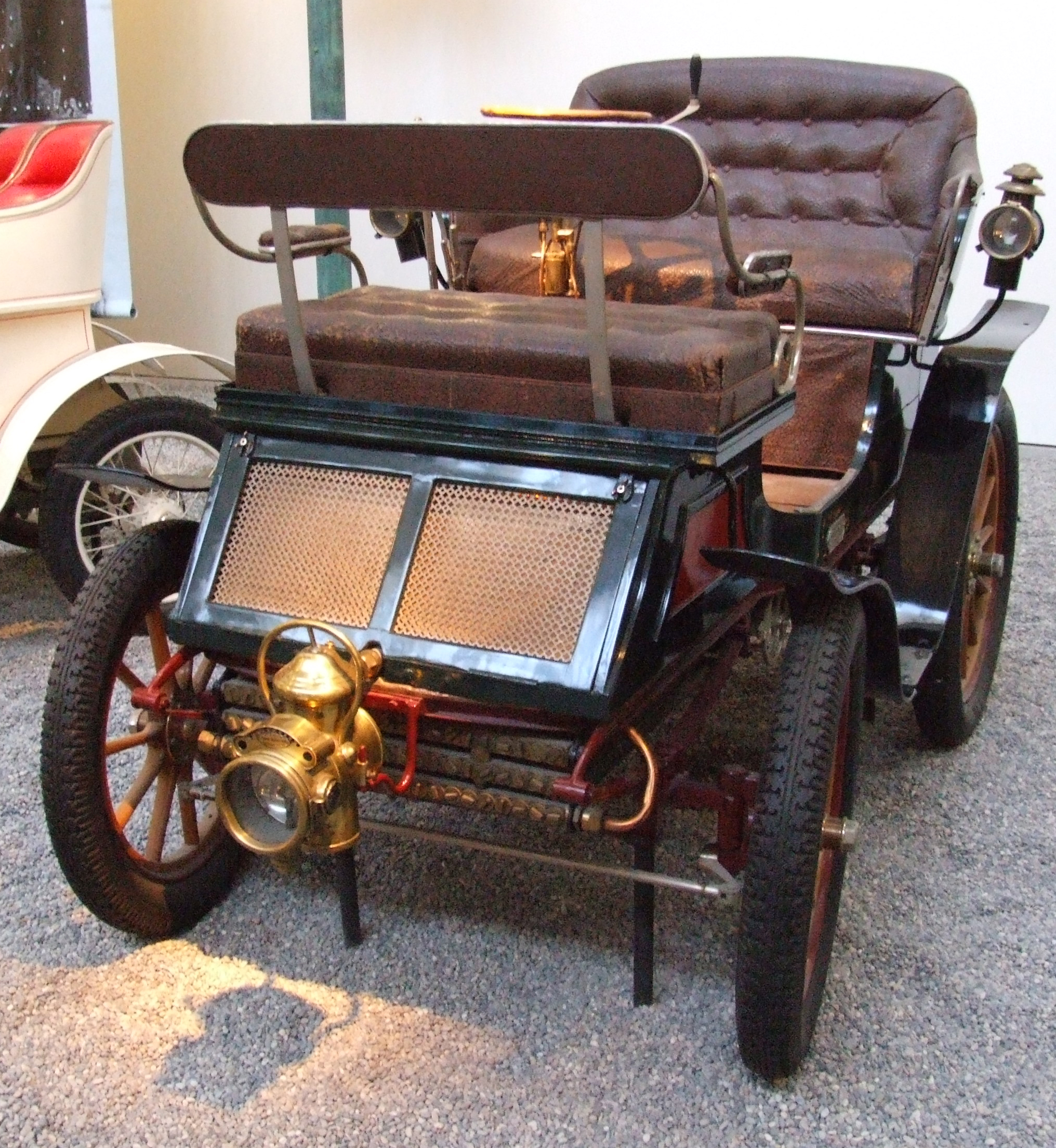
1901 Serpollet Vis-a-Vis Typ_D, 1901, Collection Schlumpf, Mulhouse, France

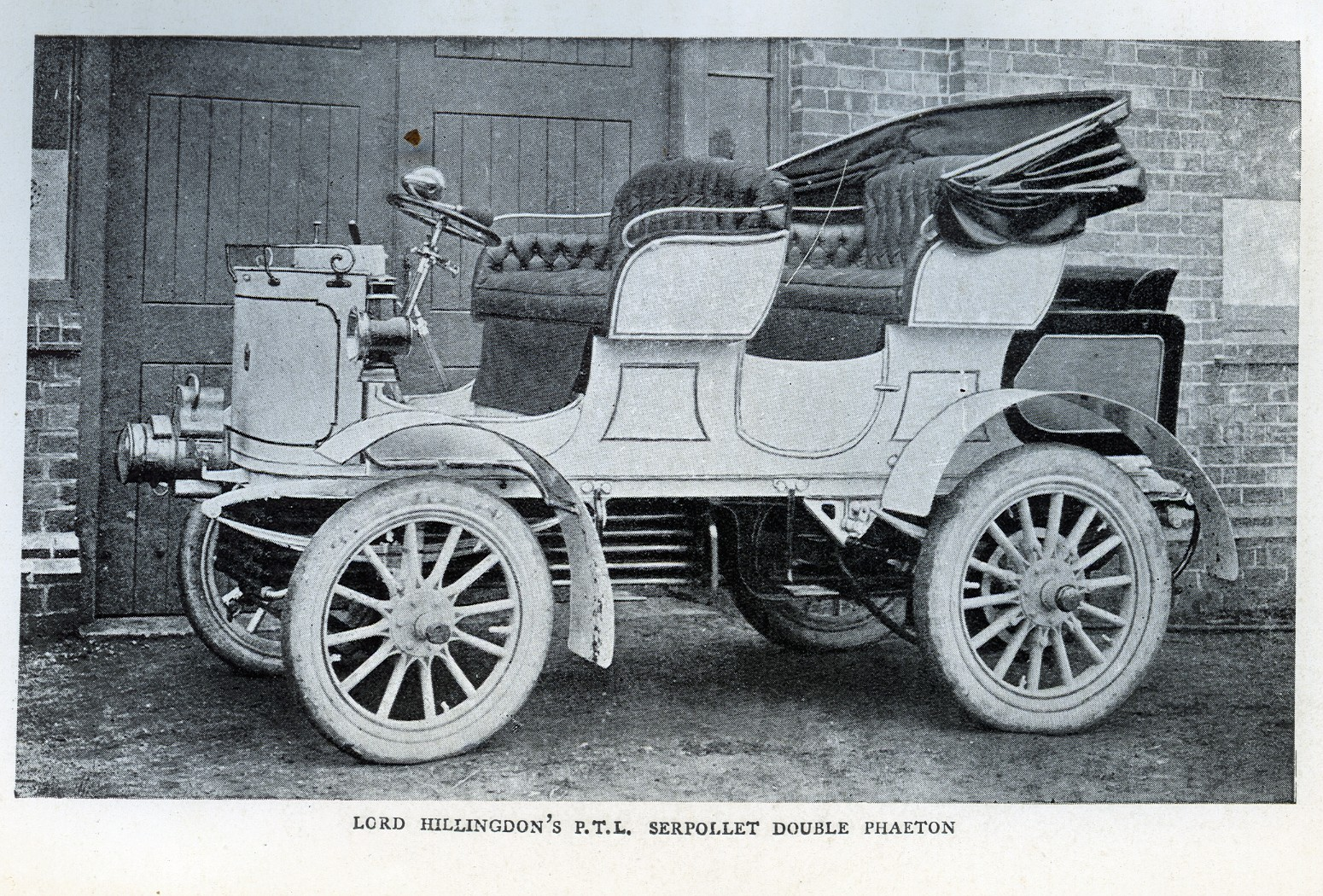
PTL Serpollet double phaeton c. 1902

Racing two-seater 1902

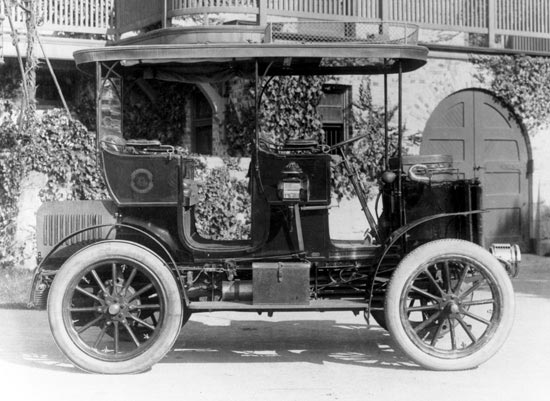
1903 Gardner-Serpollet now at Larz Anderson Auto Museum

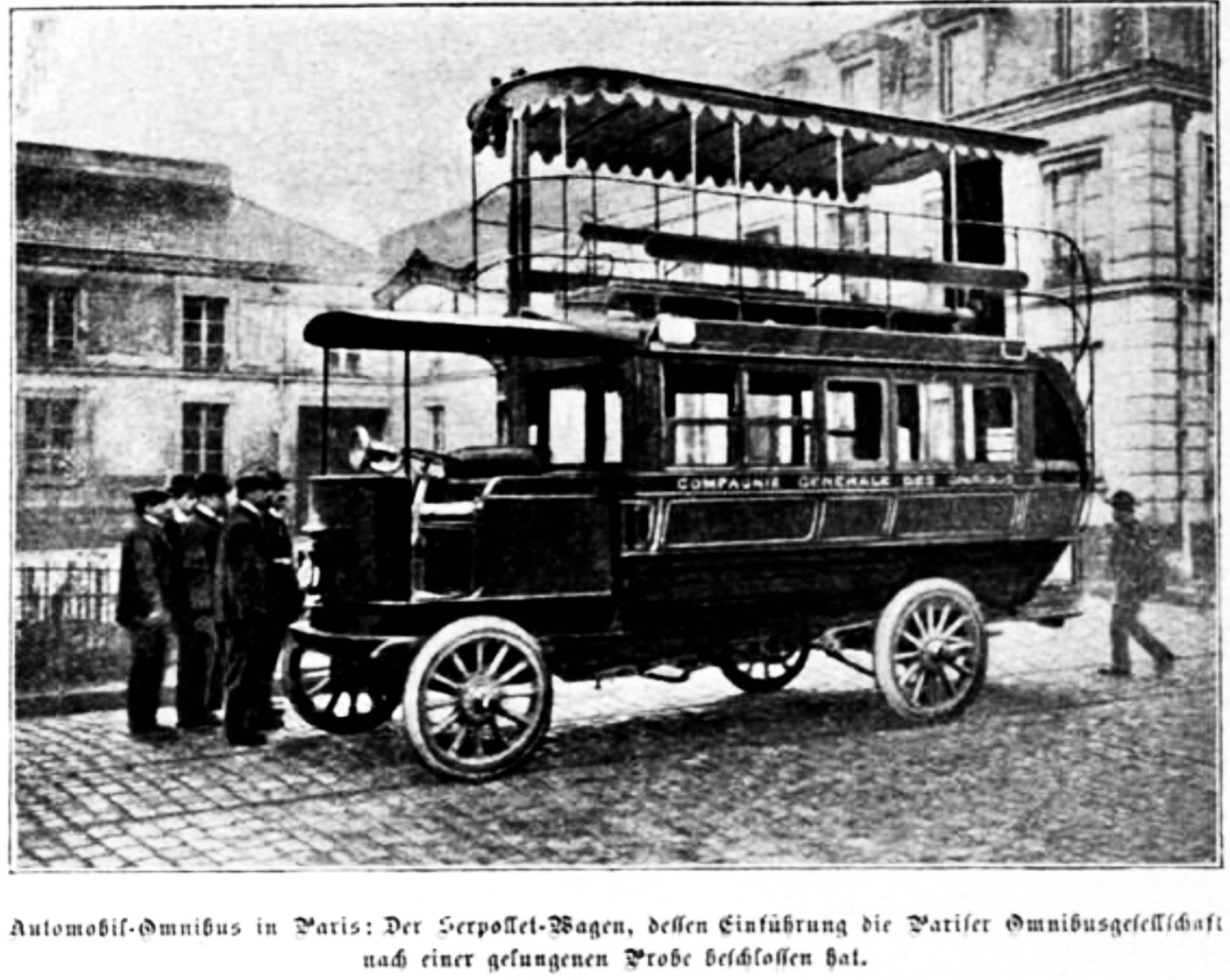
Serpollet 40 HP (1905).

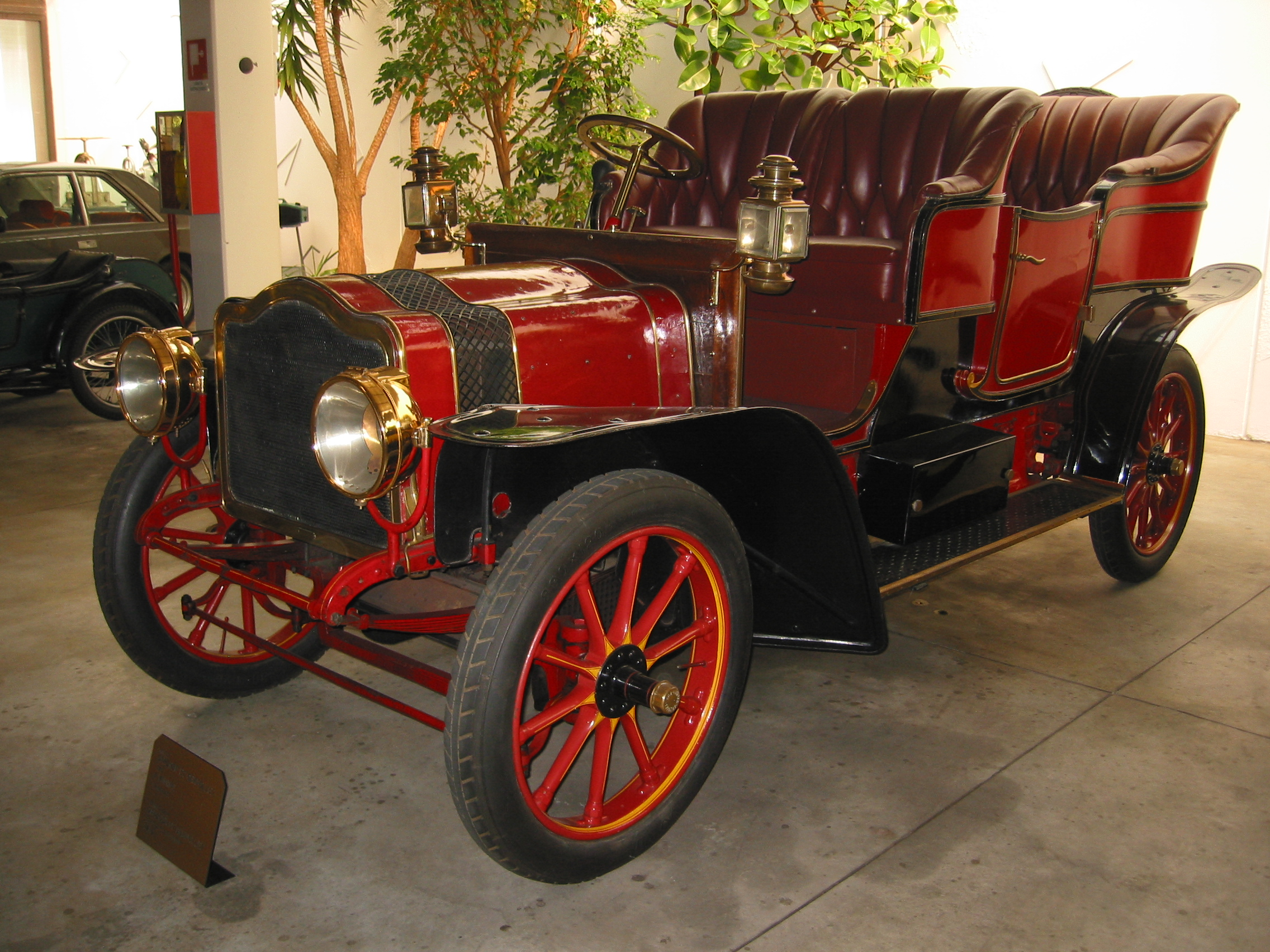
Phaeton 1906

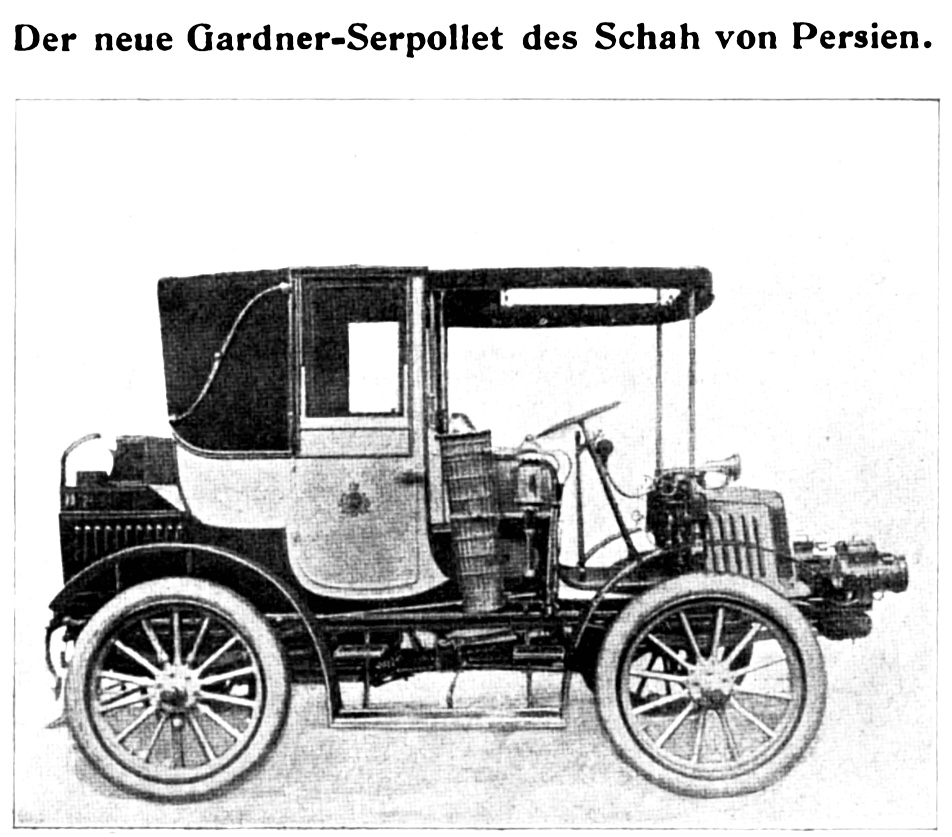
Gardner-Serpollet 50 hp (1902) in the possession of the Shah of Persia Mozaffar ad-Din Shah Qajar

Gardner-Serpollet was a French manufacturer of steam-powered cars in the early 20th century. Léon Serpollet is credited with inventing and perfecting the flash boiler in the late 1800s.

Serpollet produced his own automobiles under the name Serpollet and Gardner-Serpollet until his death in 1907.

== Origins ==
Léon Serpollet was born in the Ain department of France, and went on to establish his factory with his brother Henri on the rue des Cloÿs in the 18th arrondissement of Paris, a location that has become the Parc Léon Serpollet today. In 1886, the brothers formed La Société des Moteurs Serpollet Frères in Montmartre.

== Flash boiler ==
Leon Serpollet and his brother Henri, early French steam car pioneers, worked together to perfect the flash tube boiler that introduced an efficient and new way to produce steam. The exact date that their innovative system was first built appears to be unknown, but after further development it went on to make steam power in an automobile more practical because of its advanced design and quick steam output. They made a steam tricycle in the late eighteen-eighties to test the steam engines and it soon convinced others of the merit of the design.

In 1896, Léon Serpollet patented the flash boiler, which made steam a much more practical source of power for an automobile. The oil-fired flash boiler fed steam to a very advanced four-cylinder enclosed engine similar to the contemporary petrol engine design including poppet valves and an enclosed crankcase.

== 1894 Paris-Rouen ==
On July 22, 1894 four Serpollet vehicles competed in the Le Petit Journal Contest for Horseless Carriages from Paris to Rouen. Maurice Le Blant finished 14th and Ernest Archdeacon finished 16th, but 'De Prandiéres' and Étienne le Blant stopped en route.

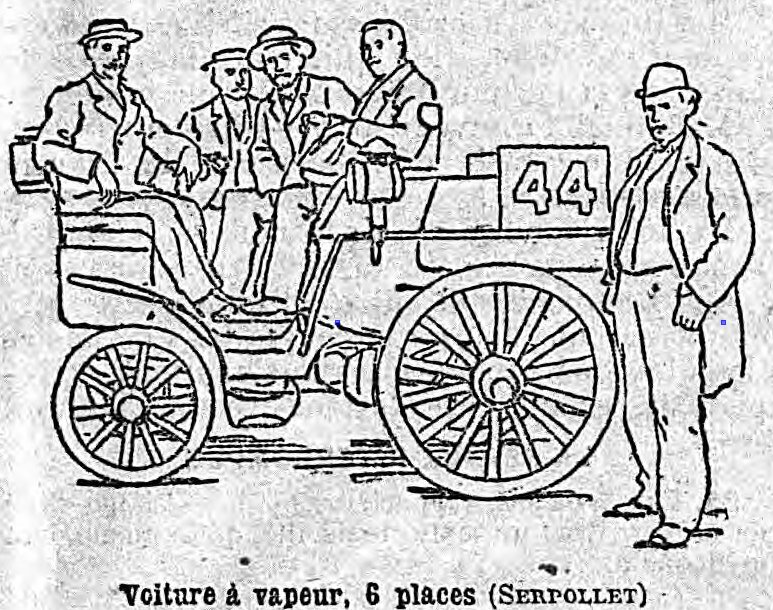
Serpollet
steam car
De Prandiéres did not finish
Le Petit Journal - Contest for Horseless Carriages, Paris-Rouen.
Le Petit Journal
Sunday July 22, 1894

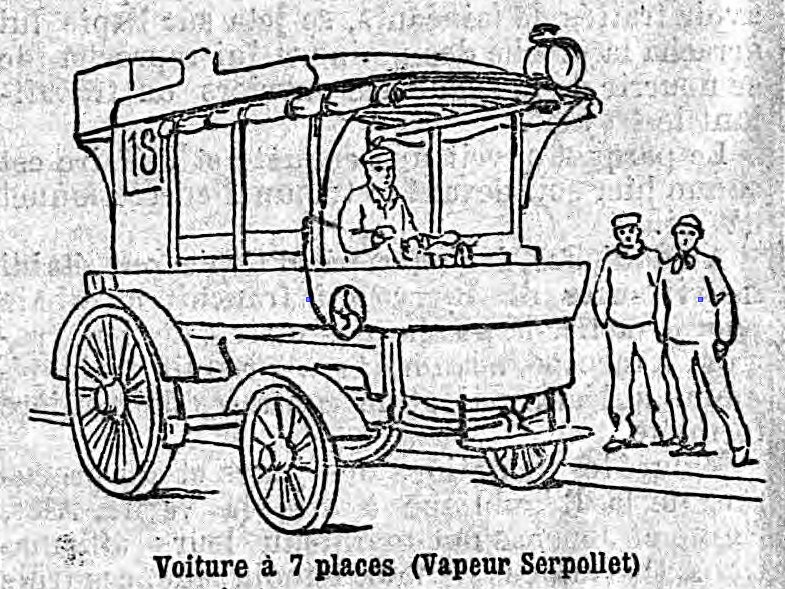
Serpollet
steam car with 7 seats
Ernest Archdeacon finished 16th
Le Petit Journal - Contest for Horseless Carriages, Paris-Rouen.
Le Petit Journal
Sunday July 22, 1894

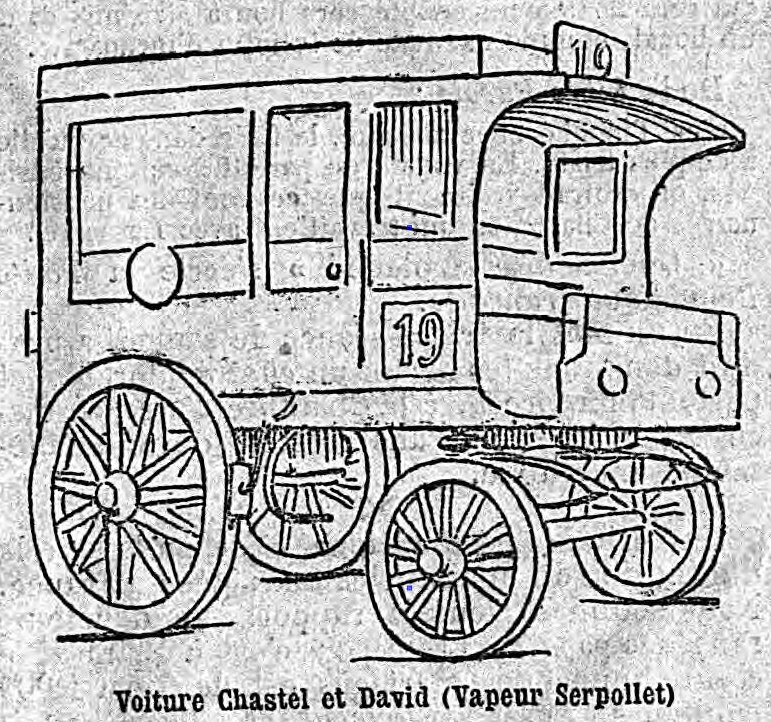
Chastel et David Serpollet
steam
Étienne le Blant did not finish
Le Petit Journal - Contest for Horseless Carriages, Paris-Rouen.
Le Petit Journal
Sunday July 22, 1894

== Gardner-Serpollet formed ==
In 1898, the brothers met Frank Gardner, a wealthy American. They formed the Gardner-Serpollet Company which began producing cars in 1900.

A 1903 Gardner-Serpollet is on display at Larz Anderson Auto Museum in Brookline, Massachusetts.

== The Easter Egg ==
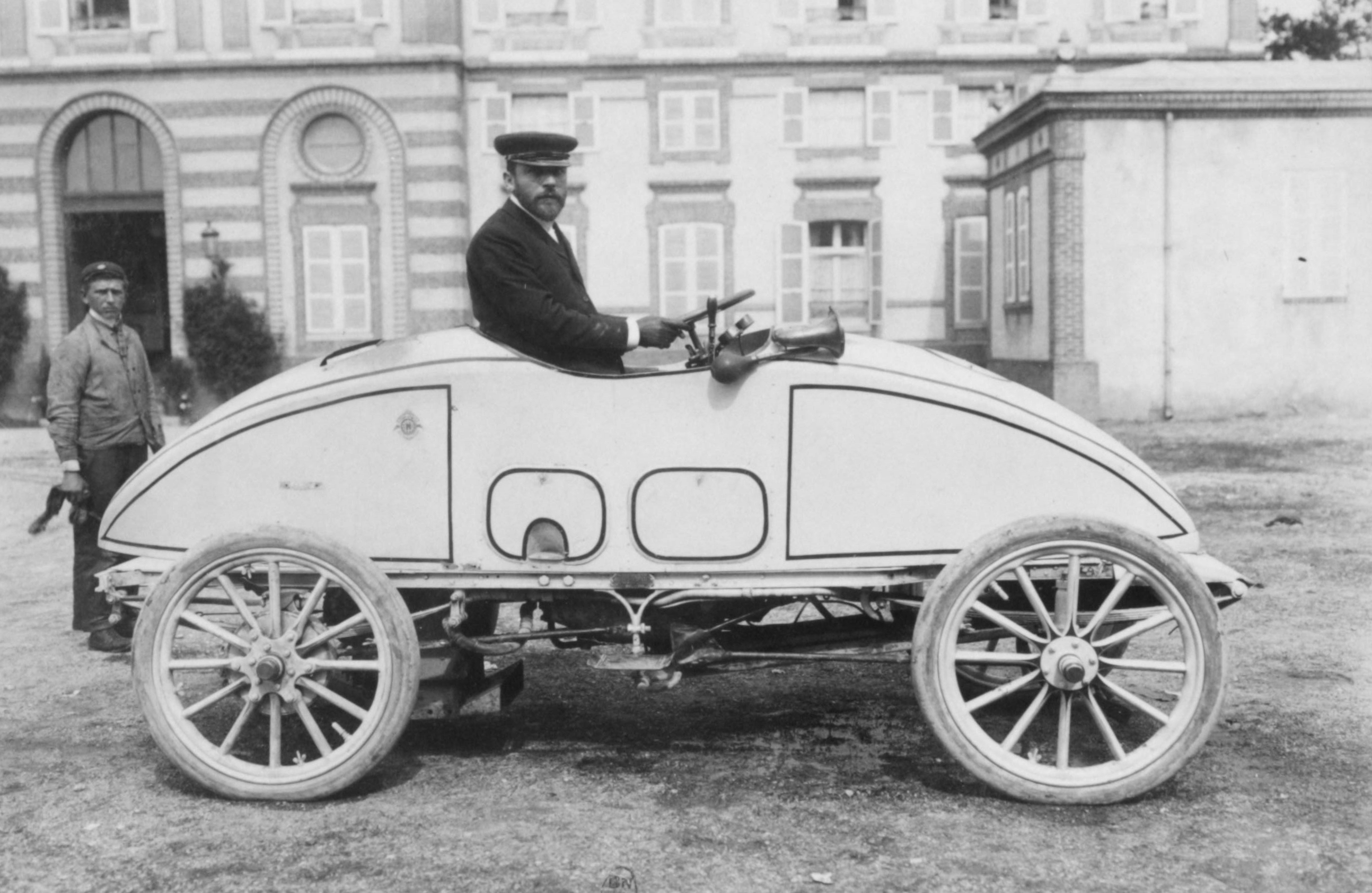
Léon Serpollet in his Œuf de Pâques at Deauville, 26 August 1902

Besides being an inventor and manufacturer, Leon Serpollet became the first driver of a non-electrically powered car to hold the Land Speed Record. His ovoid steam car Œuf de Pâques (Easter Egg) reached a speed of 120 km/h (75 mph) over the flying kilometre on the Promenade des Anglais at Nice, France on April 13, 1902, exceeding the 1899 record of Camille Jenatzy's La Jamais Contente.

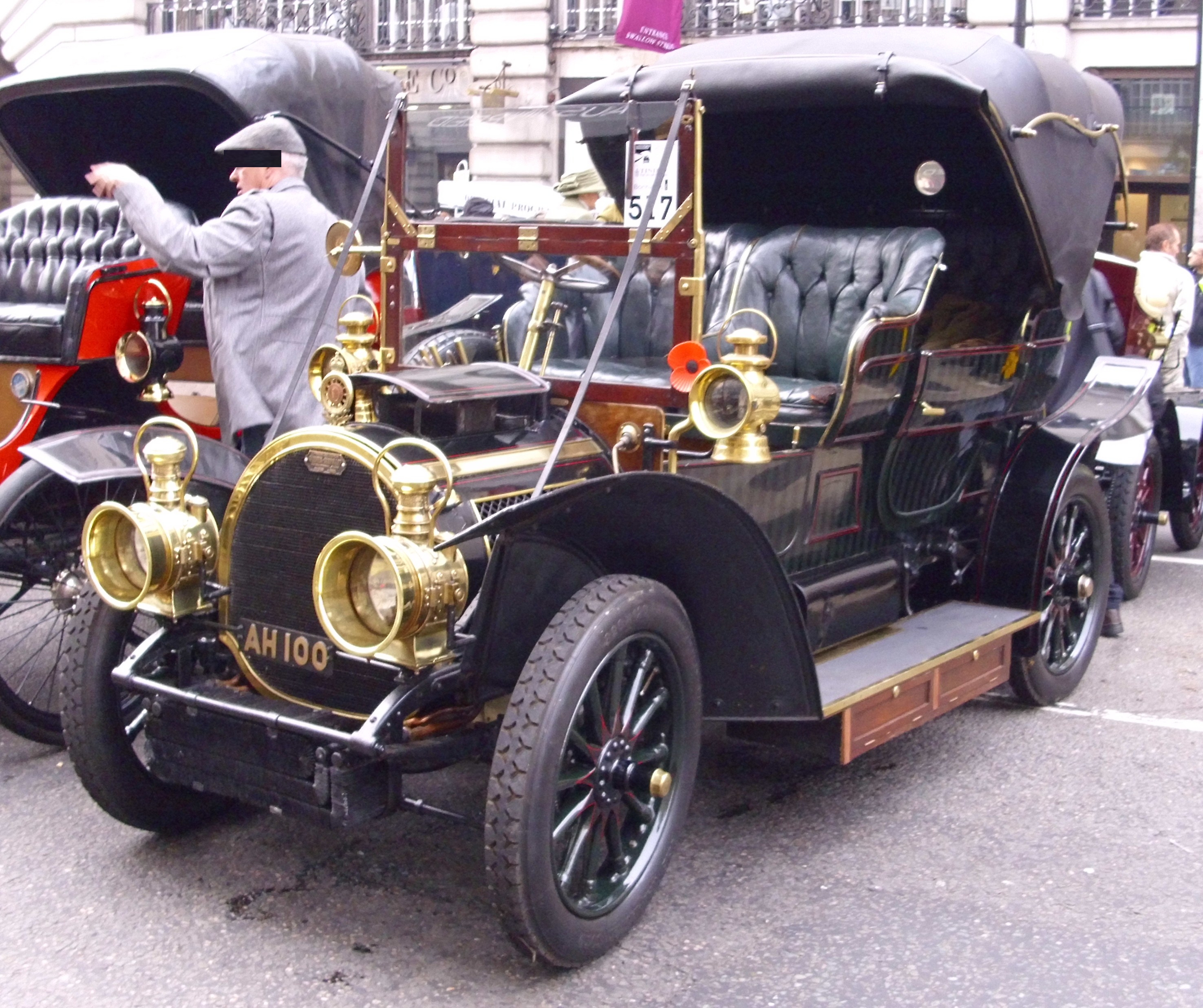
phaéton tulipée 1905

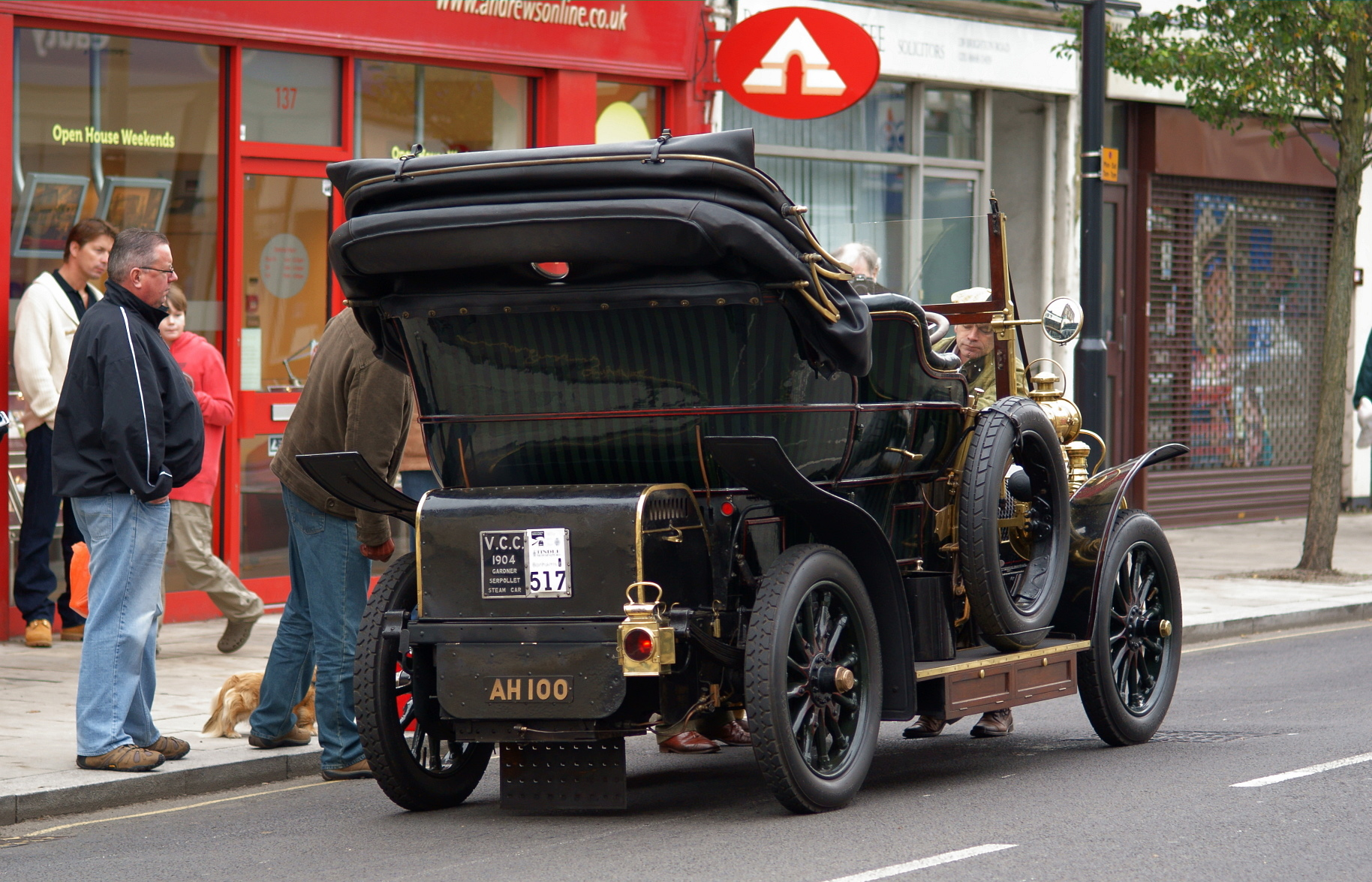
1905 phaéton tulipée on the road

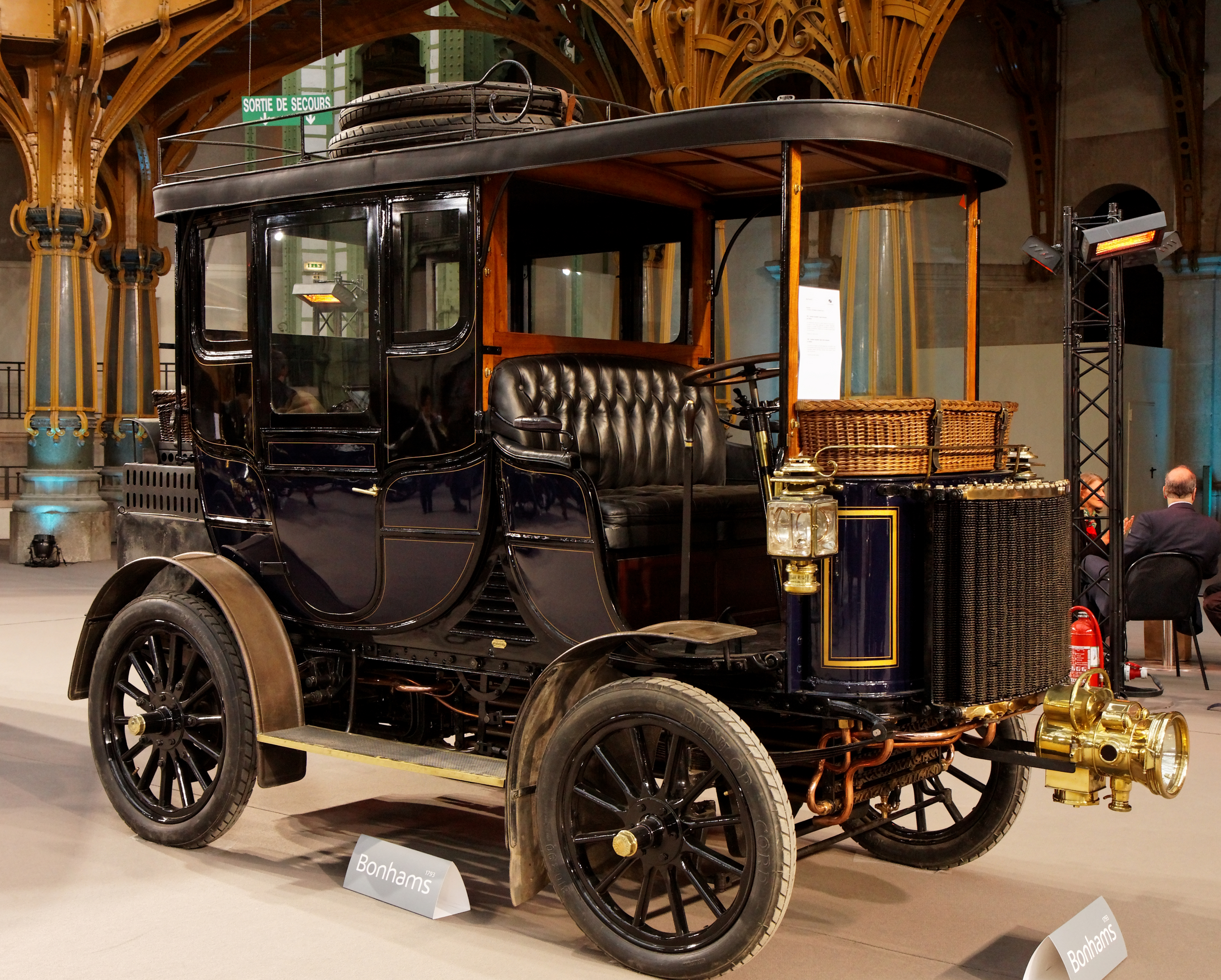
coupé-limousine 1905 body by Kellner
