= Steam generator (boiler) =

Low water-content boiler

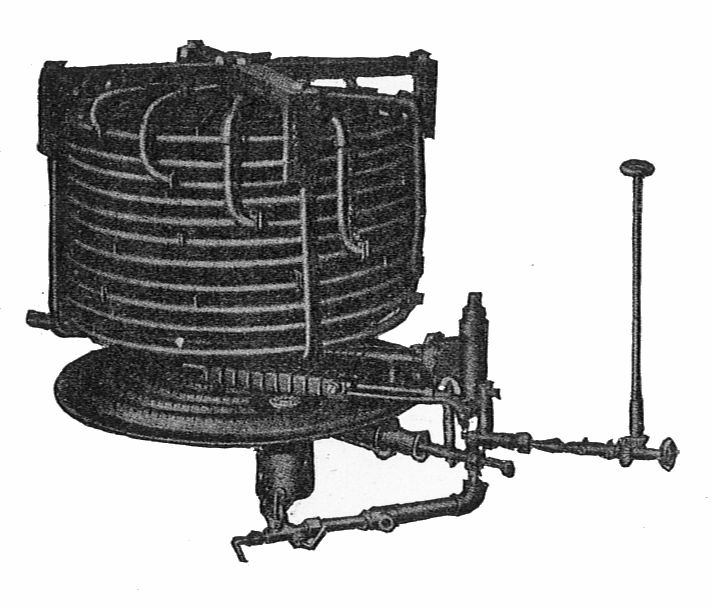
A monotube boiler, a type of steam generator (early 1900s White Motor Company)

A steam generator is a form of low water-content boiler, similar to a flash steam boiler. The usual construction is as a spiral coil of water-tube, arranged as a single, or monotube, coil. Circulation is once-through and pumped under pressure, as a forced-circulation boiler. The narrow-tube construction, without any large-diameter drums or tanks, means that they are safe from the effects of explosion, (Note: This safety from explosion is due to two causes. Firstly, small diameter tubes are inherently stronger than large tubes of the same construction, as was first appreciated by William Fairbairn in the mid-19th century. Secondly, the low water-content means that there is relatively little volume of water per area of heating surface (i.e. boiler power). As the destructive energy of a boiler explosion is largely due to the sudden release of this energy, and proportional to water volume, a low water-content boiler has a more favourable ratio of useful power (from its area) to risk (from its volume).) even if worked at high pressures. The pump flowrate is adjustable, according to the quantity of steam required at that time. The burner output is throttled to maintain a constant working temperature. The burner output required varies according to the quantity of water being evaporated: this can be either adjusted by open-loop control according to the pump throughput, or by a closed-loop control to maintain the measured temperature.

They are used as auxiliary boilers on ships.

== Types ==
=== Stone-Vapor ===
One of the best-known designs is the Stone-Vapor. The inner casing of the boiler forms a vertical bell, with an outer airtight cylindrical casing. The oil or gas burner is mounted at the top, above the coils, and facing downwards. The heating element is a single tube, arranged into a number of helical cylinders. The first helices (in the flow direction) are small-diameter tubes, wrapped in large diameter turns. Succeeding turns are coiled inside this and the tube is of progressively increasing diameter, to allow for a constant flow rate as the water evaporates into steam and forms bubbles. The steam outlet is from the final turn at the bottom of the inner helix. The outlet is approximately 90% steam (by mass) and residual water is separated by passing it through a steam-water separator. The exhaust gases turn upwards and flow over the outside of the bell, usually passing additional helices that are used as an initial feedwater heater.

=== Clayton ===
The Clayton Industries steam generator is a type of forced-circulation, monotube, once-through steam generator in which boiler feedwater is pumped through a coiled tube while combustion gases heat the tube externally. Downstream of the coil, a centrifugal separator removes entrained moisture from the steam–water mixture.

Clayton steam generators are described as capable of full-range modulation, meaning that steam output can be adjusted continuously in response to changing load demands.

According to company technical literature, the design has relatively low water content compared with traditional firetube boilers and is intended to support rapid start-up from cold conditions. The heating surface consists of a coil mounted within a cylindrical casing, arranged as stacked flat spiral sections rather than helical cylindrical layers.

Feedwater enters the upper coils and flows downward through successive tube sections of increasing diameter as evaporation occurs. The final turns form a closely spaced cylindrical water-wall around the burner, where radiant heat transfer contributes to steam generation. The steam–water mixture is then routed through a centrifugal separator to produce dry steam output. The manufacturer states that steam quality after separation may reach approximately 99.5%.

=== Electric and Hybrid Steam Boilers ===
Electric and hybrid steam boilers are nowadays becoming increasingly common in industry because of the various advantages they offer over traditional natural gas-fired steam boilers. Below is more information on their areas of use, efficiency and pluses.

Electric and hybrid steam boilers are often used in industries where sustainability, energy efficiency and safety play a major role, such as the food, pharmaceutical and chemical industries. An electric steam boiler has no emissions and allows for CO2-neutral steam production.

Electric steam boilers are very efficient because they use electricity as an energy source instead of fossil fuels such as natural gas. They have no combustion process and produce no greenhouse gas emissions or other harmful emissions. In addition, they have lower energy consumption and require less maintenance than traditional steam boilers.

Electric and hybrid steam boilers offer several advantages, including higher reliability, flexibility and safety. They are easier to install and require less space than traditional steam boilers, which is especially useful for smaller spaces. In addition, they are quieter to operate and produce less vibration and noise. Finally, electric and hybrid steam boilers are fully automatic and have advanced control and monitoring systems that ensure optimal operation and safety.

== See also ==
- Steam generator (railroad)
