= Vertical fire-tube boiler =

Steam boiler powered by vertical fire tubes

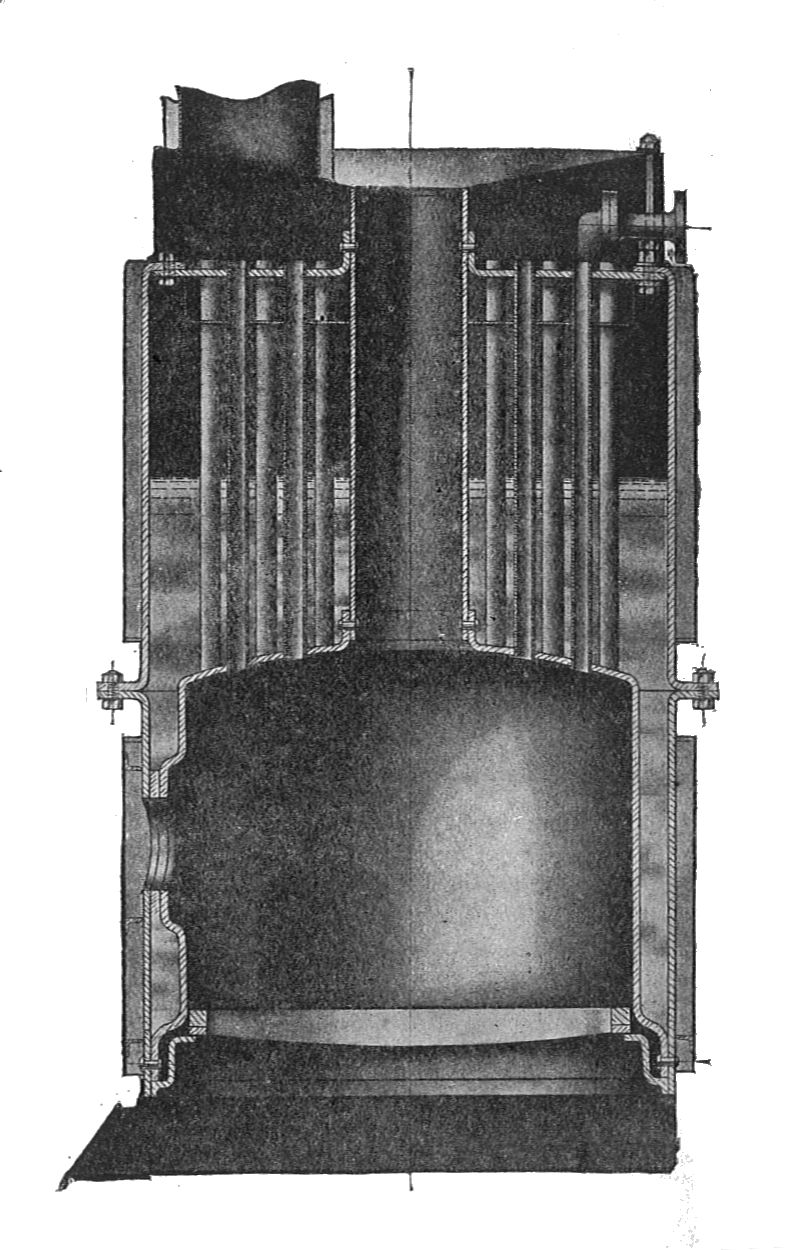
Vertical fire-tube boiler, as used in a Leyland steam wagon

A vertical fire-tube boiler or vertical multitubular boiler is a vertical boiler where the heating surface is composed of multiple small fire-tubes, arranged vertically.

These boilers were not common, owing to drawbacks with excessive wear in service. The more common form of vertical boiler, which was very similar in external appearance, instead used a single flue and water-filled cross-tubes. Another form used horizontal fire-tubes, even where this added complexity, such as the Cochran boiler.

Where a sustained high evaporative capacity (i.e. power) was required, vertical tubes were used, but rarely. These cases were mostly for locomotives, either railway locomotives or road steam wagons.

== Drawbacks ==
In any boiler, one of the most prone locations for tube and plate wastage is around the water level, where agitation and boiling is most active. This is particularly so when this level is also part of the heated surface, where boiling is most intense (water-tube boiler designs also strive to submerge their directly heated surface beneath the water level, for the same reason).

In this design of boiler, the erosion area affected is part-way up the fire-tubes. Although such tubes are usually designed to be easily replaced, (Note: Tube replacement is a common in-service task for locomotive-pattern boilers.) their working life is relatively short.

=== Horizontal tubes ===
Horizontal fire-tubes are otherwise more efficient than vertical. For that reason, and to avoid the problems of tube erosion with exposed vertical tubes, many of the multi-tubular vertical boilers were instead arranged with their tubes horizontal. These could be either a parallel bank, such as the Cochran boiler, or else radial as for the Robertson.

=== Submerged tubes ===
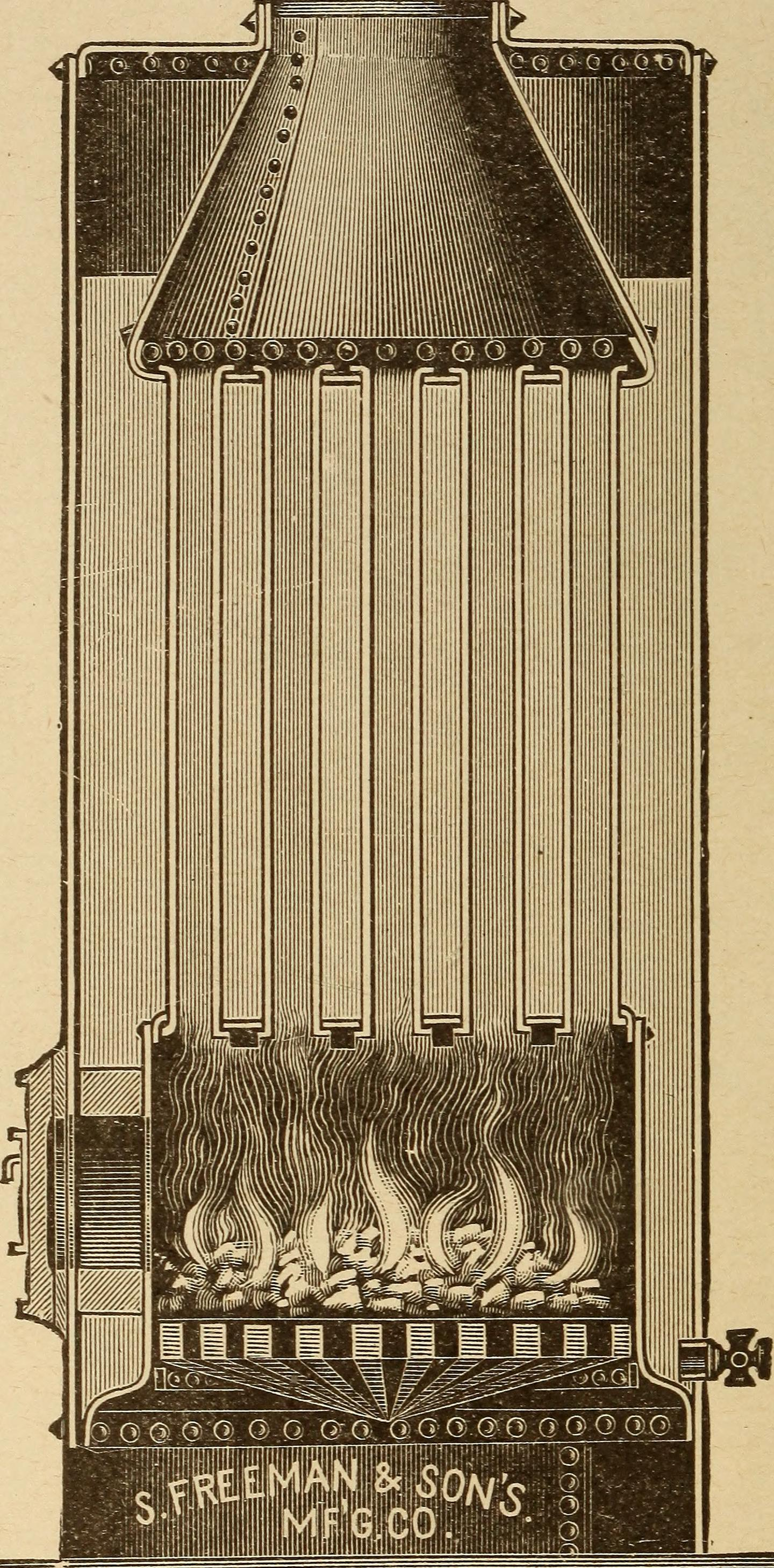
Submerged tube boiler

To avoid the problem of exposed fire-tubes above the water level, the submerged multi-tube boiler may be used. The upper boiler shell is extended upwards in an annular ring, so as to always maintain the whole length of the tubes submerged. Used in steam wagons and similar, where the water-level may be disturbed as the vehicle climbs a hill.

The relatively rare Fowler steam wagons used a boiler of this form. The main barrel of the boiler contained a nest of curved firetubes between the stayless firebox and a large open space that formed a smokebox containing a five-turn spiral tube superheater. Both tubeplates were domed inwards, making them strong enough to not require staying. The firetubes were curved to 'cause eddies in the hot gases as they rise', to allow for free expansion with heat and also to allow a perpendicular joint between tube and tubeplate.

An external belt of a channel plate riveted around the outside of the shell at the level of the upper tubeplate formed an additional steam and water space, linked below the water level by drilled holes through the shell. The boiler's operating water level was always maintained within this belt space, keeping the tubes entirely submerged. Drawbacks to this system were that the area of the water surface was reduced, leading to both an increased risk of priming and also the need to carefully maintain the boiler's water level; the ratio of volume to height becoming smaller in the belt region, a relatively small change in water volume produces a large change in level.

A similar approach may be seen as the upper bulge around the vertical boiler of the reconstructed GWR railmotor.

This design has also been suggested for model engineering use. In this case the belt was formed inside the boiler shell, with a tubeplate of reduced diameter set inside it.

== Stanley steam car ==
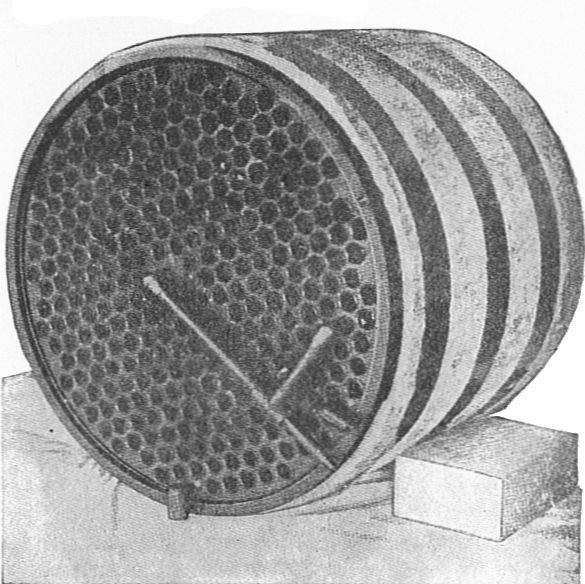
Stanley steam car boiler

Some steam cars, including the Stanley and the Chelmsford, used multi-tube vertical boilers, the Stanley design being particularly well-known.

The Stanley boiler is constructed of a seamless copper tube shell, 13 1/2 inches (340 mm) in diameter and 1/16 inch (1.6 mm) thick. The numerous 1/2 inch (13 mm) tubes are densely packed, leaving a very small water volume between them and a high ratio of heating surface to volume, for rapid steam raising. Construction of the boiler is unusual, as the steel tube plates are merely held in place by friction and the tubes are only lightly expanded into them with a tapered drift. Around the outside of the boiler shell are three heat-shrunk steel rings, the compressive stress of which retains the tubeplate. For additional strength, the boiler shell is further wrapped in a helical layer of piano wire. As the boiler is fired by a flat liquid-fuel burner, no enclosed firebox is required.

== See also ==
- Vertical cross-tube boiler
- Vertical boiler with horizontal fire-tubes
