= East London Harbour 0-4-0VB =

Class of 4 South African 0-4-0VBT locomotives

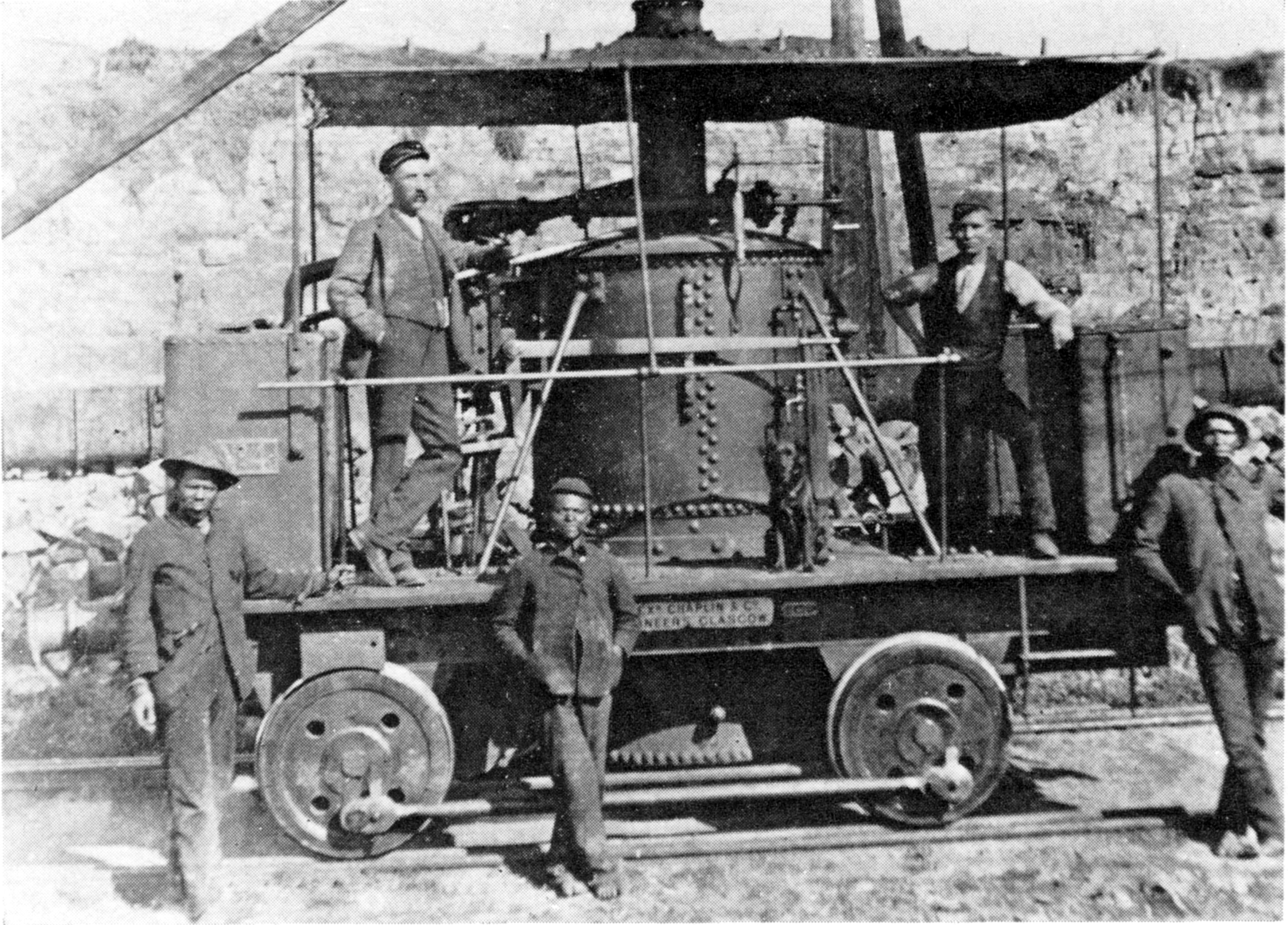
- East London Harbour's vertical boiler type locomotive no. 4, c. 1880, with engine and shunting crew and a dog on the footplate
Type and origin
- Power type: Steam
- Designer: Alexander Chaplin & Co.
- Builder: Alexander Chaplin & Co.
- Serial number: 1584, 1694, 2117, 2129
- Build date: 1873-1879
Specifications
- Configuration
  - Whyte: 0-4-0VB
  - UIC: Bn2t
- Driver: 1st coupled axle
- Gauge: 7 ft 1/4 in (2,140 mm) Brunel
- Fuel type: Wood
- Boiler
  - Type: Vertical
- Cylinders: Two
- Cylinder size: 7 in (178 mm) bore 14 in (356 mm) stroke
- Couplers: Buffers-and-chain
Performance figures
- Power output: 15 hp (11 kW)
Career
- Operators: East London Harbour Board
- Number in class: 4
- Numbers: 1-4
- Delivered: 1873-1880
- First run: 17 August 1874

The East London Harbour 0-4-0VB of 1873 was a South African steam locomotive from the pre-Union era in the Cape of Good Hope.

In 1847, the government of the Cape of Good Hope established harbour boards at its three major ports, Table Bay, Port Elizabeth and East London. While railway lines were laid at all these harbours, trains were for the most part initially hauled by oxen or mules.

The first steam locomotive to see service at East London Harbour was a 7 ft 1/4 in (2,140 mm) Brunel gauge engine which was obtained for work on breakwater construction in 1873 and placed in service in 1874. It was a 0-4-0VB engine, similar in general appearance to the American Grasshopper type. Four of them were acquired between 1873 and 1880.

== The harbour boards ==
When the requirement for improved harbour facilities for the handling of ships and cargoes became apparent, the Cape Government established harbour boards at Table Bay, Port Elizabeth and East London in 1847. Each board initially consisted of five members, later increased to seven. They were responsible for the management, control, improvement, development and maintenance of the facilities at these ports and empowered to levy wharfage dues.

== East London Harbour ==
Railway lines were an early feature at all these harbours. East London Harbour was surveyed by Sir John Coode in 1870 and breakwater construction began in 1872, under the supervision of resident engineer William Lester. The first of four stone quarries to supply rock for the construction of the breakwaters was opened in June 1872 and made use of convict labour and oxen-drawn rail trucks. Construction of the South Breakwater, on the west bank of the Buffalo River, was completed by August 1873.

The wide 7 ft 1/4 in (2,140 mm) Brunel gauge track was used during breakwater construction at both East London and Table Bay harbours to make it easier to drop rock from the wagons between the rails, which were run out to sea on a timber framework. This method of construction was perfected by Sir John Coode.

== Manufacturer ==
The first locomotives at East London Harbour were acquired for breakwater construction and the first of eventually four steam locomotives was delivered in 1873. It was ordered from Alexander Chaplin & Co. in Glasgow and, even though it arrived on 2 July 1873, it was only placed in service on 17 August 1874 when it was used for passenger rides on the first day, before being put to construction work. Three more of these locomotives were acquired from Alexander Chaplin, one more in 1874 and another two in 1879 and early 1880.

The locomotive, with a 0-4-0VB wheel arrangement, a vertical boiler and vertical cylinders, was similar in general appearance to the Grasshopper type locomotive which appeared on the Baltimore and Ohio Railroad in the United States of America in 1832 and whose name seems to have come from the movement of the exposed vertical valve gear. While very little is known about the locomotive, it appears from the existing photograph to have been wood-fired and driven by a marine type of vertical engine.

Alexander Chaplin produced a range of steam-powered industrial products which included steam cranes, hoists, locomotives, pumping and winding engines, ship's deck engines and sea water distilling apparatus. Between 1860 and 1899, it delivered 135 of these locomotives to customers around the world.

== Service ==
All four engines were used during construction and later also worked as shunting locomotives on the West Bank lines of the East London Harbour. At least one of them survived into the 20th century, since the Harbour Board reports still listed one "old 15 HP locomotive" on the books in 1904. The Brunel gauge lines were finally regauged or closed between 1909 and 1912.

In South Africa, the locomotive type was not unique to East London Harbour and several others saw service on industrial lines.

== Works numbers ==
The locomotive works numbers and dates of completion are listed in the table.

East London Harbour Board 0-4-0
Loco no.	Works no.	Ex works date
1	1584	12 Apr 1873
2	1694	30 Jun 1874
3	2117	21 Jun 1879
4	2129	26 Dec 1879
