= Vertical boiler =

Type of boiler used in early steam equipment

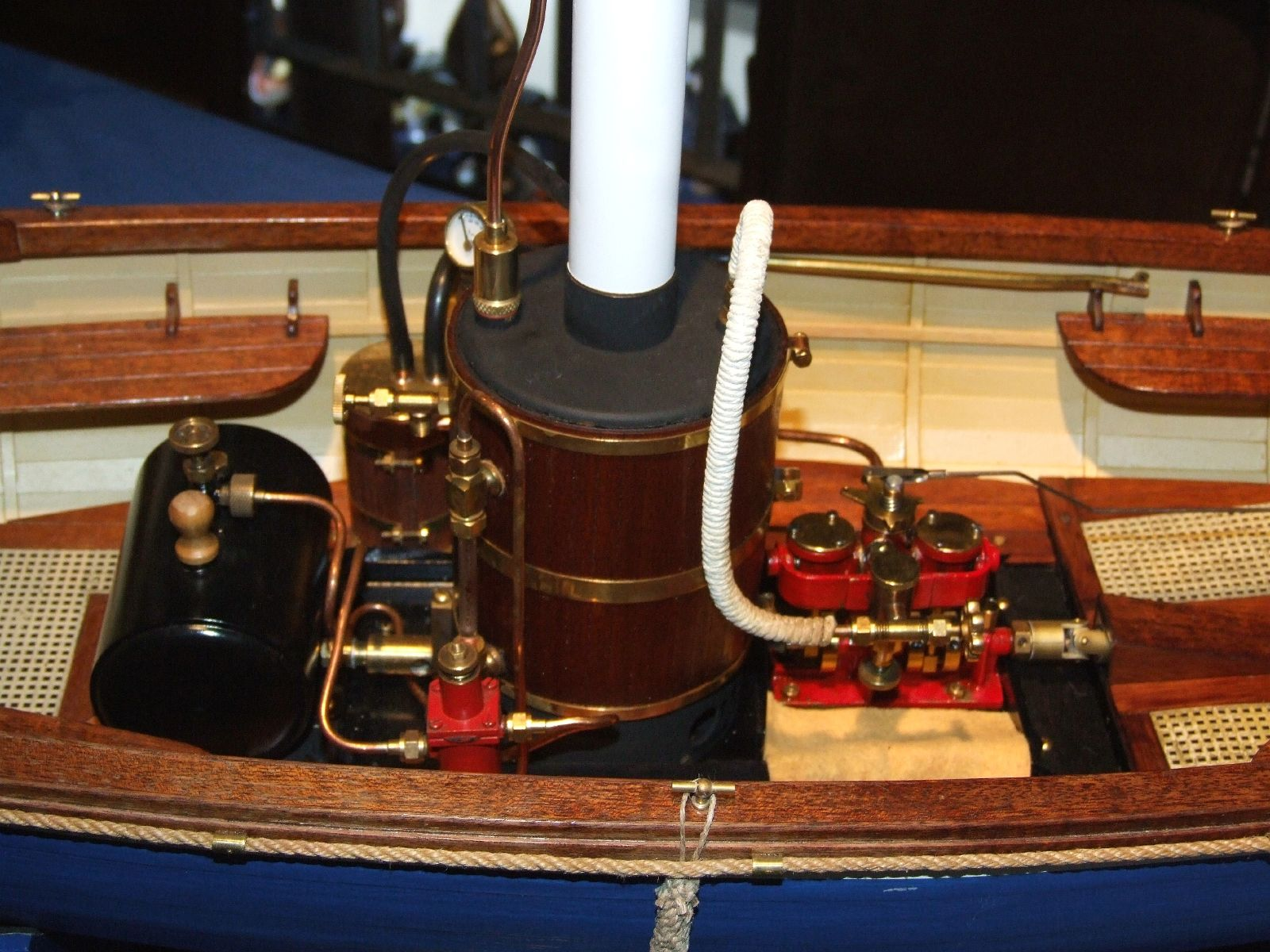
Detail of vertical boiler and associated steam engine in a working model steam launch

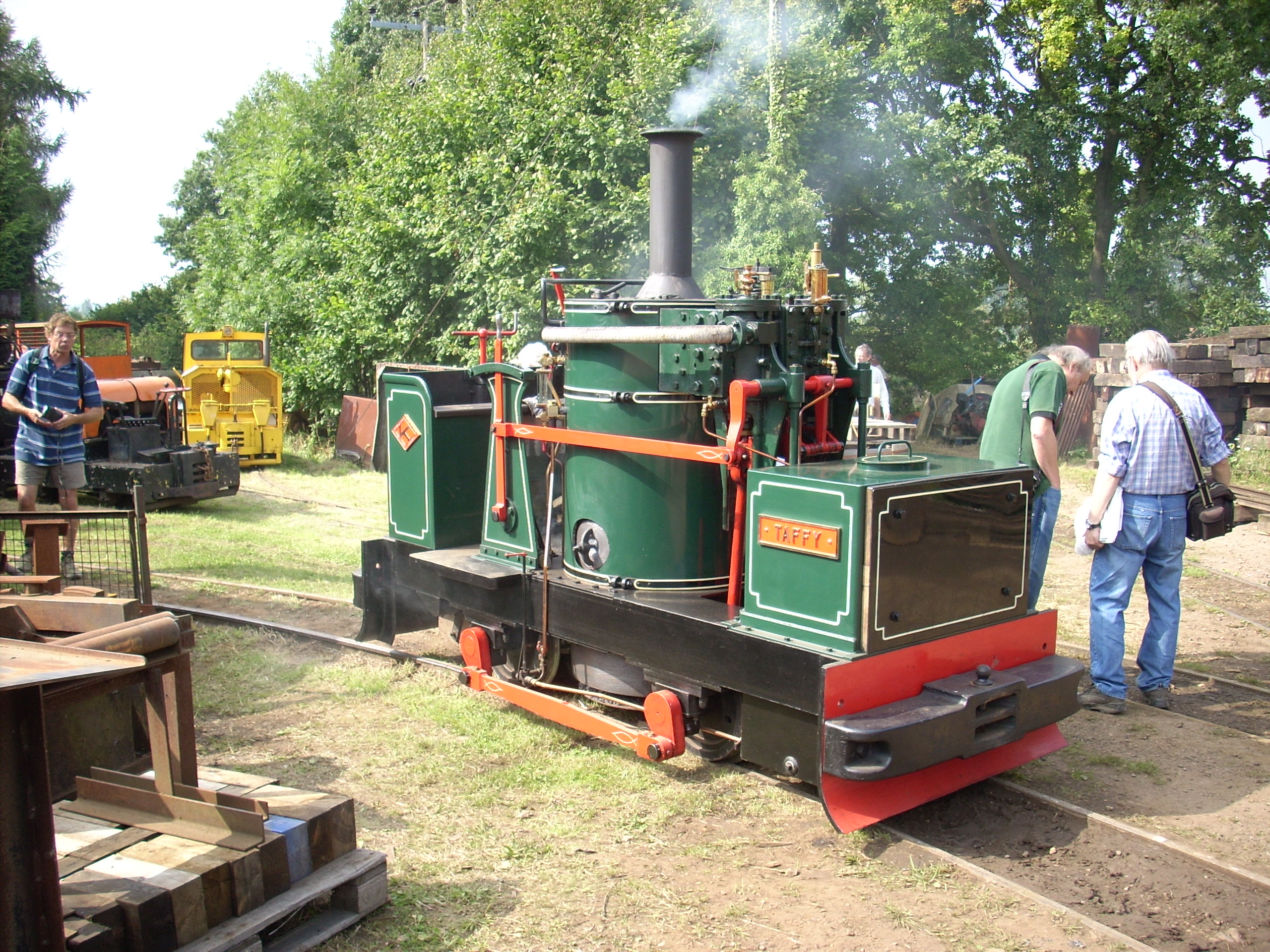
Taffy a replica of Chaloner, a de Winton vertical-boilered narrow gauge railway locomotive

A vertical boiler is a type of fire-tube or water-tube boiler where the boiler barrel is oriented vertically instead of the more common horizontal orientation. Vertical boilers were used for a variety of steam-powered vehicles and other mobile machines, including early steam locomotives.

== Design considerations ==
=== Tube arrangements ===
Many different tube arrangements have been used. Examples include:

Fire tubes

- Vertical fire-tube boiler
- Vertical boiler with horizontal fire-tubes

Water tubes

- Vertical cross-tube boiler
- Field-tube boiler
- Thimble tube boiler
- Spiral watertube boiler

=== Advantages ===
The main advantages of a vertical boiler are:

- Small footprint – where width and length constraints are critical, use of a vertical boiler permits design of a smaller machine.
- Water-level tolerance – The water level in a horizontal boiler must be maintained above the crown (top) of the firebox at all times, or the crownplate could overheat and buckle, causing a boiler explosion. For a vehicle application expected to traverse hills, such as a railway locomotive or steam wagon, maintaining the correct water level when the vehicle itself is not level is a skilled task, and one that occupies much of the fireman's time. In a vertical boiler, the water is all sitting on the top of the firebox, and the boiler would need to be extremely low on water before a gradient could cause a risk by uncovering the firebox top.
- Simpler (major) maintenance – A vertical boiler is usually mounted on a frame on the vehicle, allowing easy replacement. Horizontal boilers, such as those on railway locomotives and traction engines, form an integral part of the vehicle – the vehicle is literally built around the boiler – and hence replacement requires the dismantling of the entire vehicle.

=== Disadvantages ===
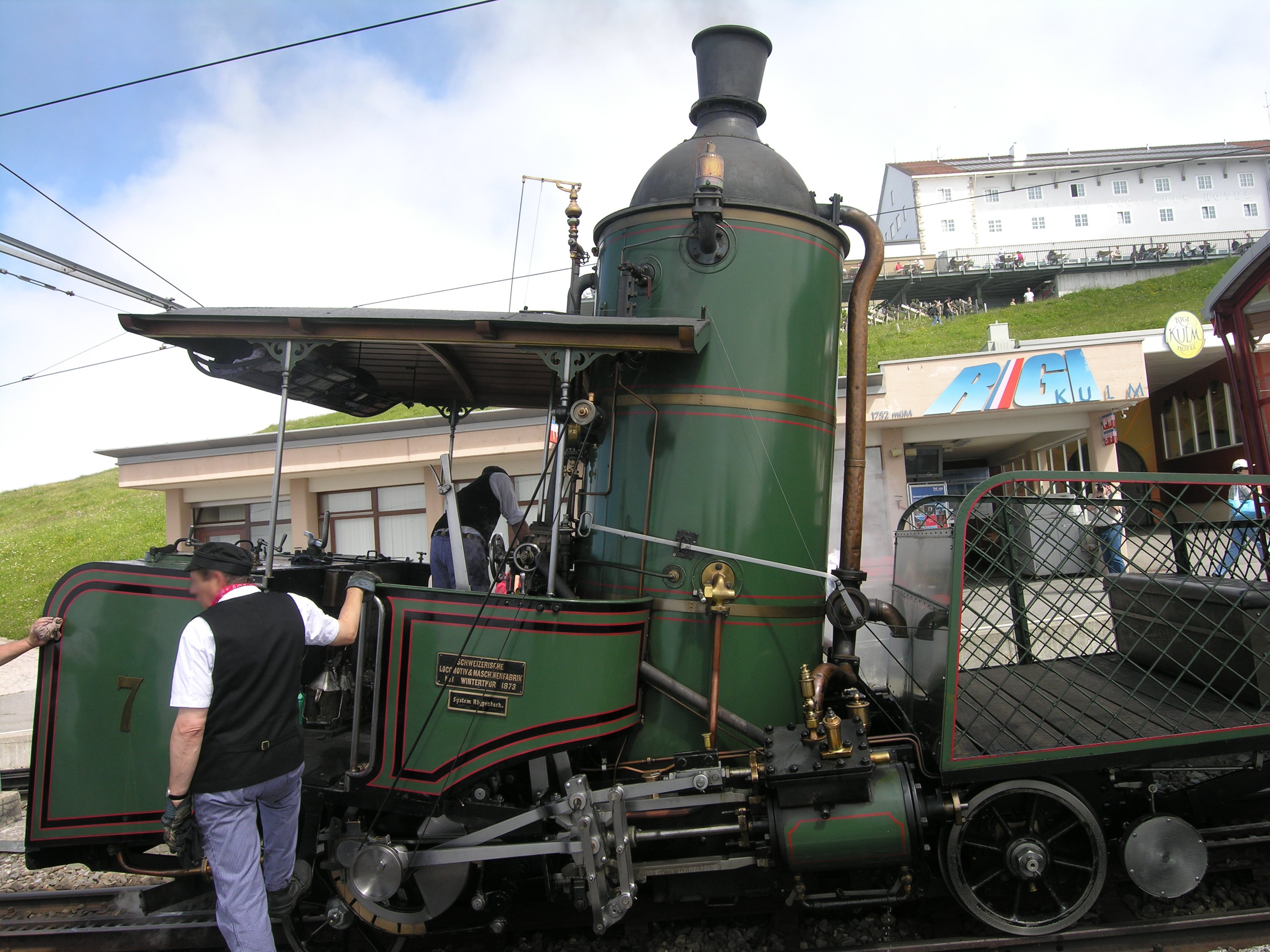
Swiss rack railway locomotive (built 1858) for operating on the steep slopes of Rigi

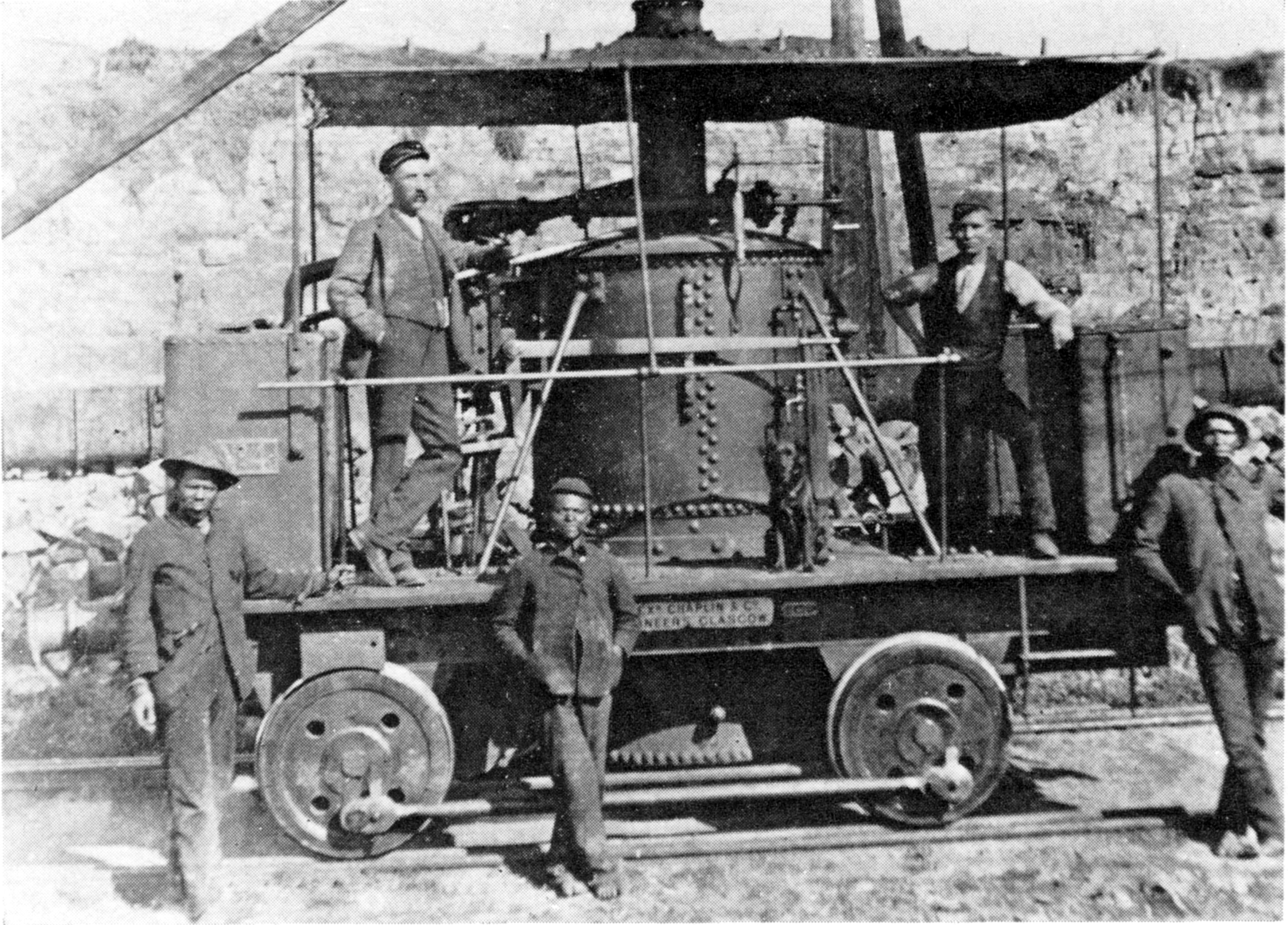
East London Harbour 0-4-0VB by Alexander Chaplin & Co.

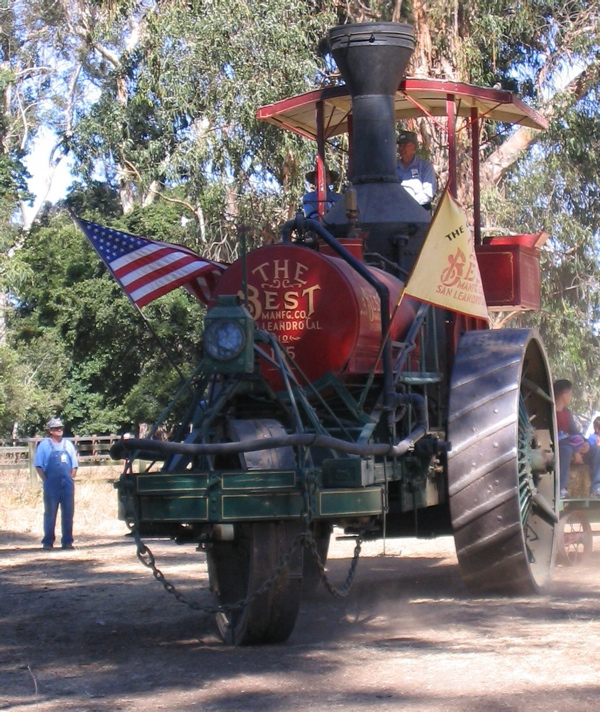
A 1905 "Best" steam tractor with vertical boiler

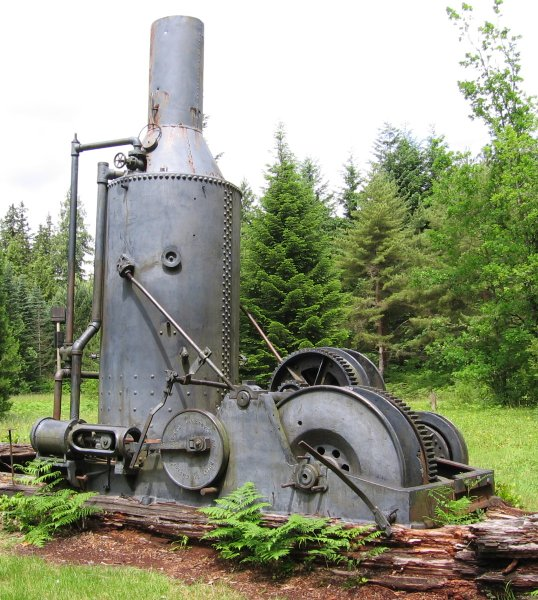
12 x 14 Empire (?) Steam donkey in the UBC Malcolm Knapp Research Forest, Maple Ridge, BC Canada

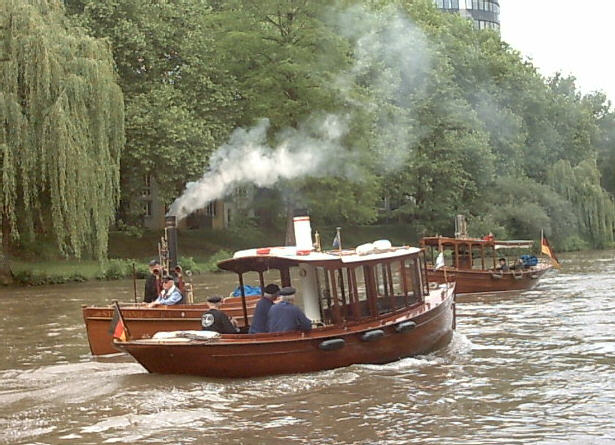
Three river steamboats with vertical boilers

The main disadvantages of a vertical boiler are:

- Size – The benefits of a small footprint are compromised by the much greater height required. The presence of over-bridges limits the height of steam vehicles, and this in turn restricts the size (and hence steam production) of the boiler.
- Grate area – This is limited to the footprint of the boiler, thus restricting the amount of steam that may be produced.
- Short tubes – Boiler tubes must be kept short to minimise height. As a result, much of the available heat is lost through the chimney, as it has too little time to heat the tubes.
- Sediment – Sediment may settle on the bottom tube sheet (the plate above the firebox) insulating the water from the heat and allowing the sheet to burn out.

== Applications ==
=== Railway locomotives ===
Several manufacturers produced a significant number of vertical boiler locomotives. Notable amongst these were:

- Alexander Chaplin & Co. of Glasgow, who produced a range of steam-powered industrial products which included steam cranes, hoists, locomotives, pumping and winding engines, ship's deck engines and sea water distilling apparatus. Between 1860 and 1899, it delivered 135 vertical boiler locomotives similar to the East London Harbour 0-4-0VB to customers around the world.
- De Winton of Caernarfon, who produced at least 34 narrow gauge locomotives, mainly for use in the slate quarries of Wales.
- Sentinel Waggon Works of Shrewsbury, who produced a large number of shunters using their high-pressure vertical boilers. These were mainly used on industrial railways in Britain.
- Société anonyme John Cockerill produced 891 standard gauge shunting locomotives between 1867 and 1942 using a standard design with five sizes.

=== Steam lorries ===
The Sentinel Waggon Works also produced a range of road lorries (steam wagons) based on their high-pressure vertical boilers

=== Steam tractors ===
The Best Manufacturing Company of San Leandro in California produced a range of steam tractors that used vertical boilers.

=== Steam rollers ===
Certain designs of steam roller departed from the conventional traction engine style of a horizontal boiler with an engine mounted above. Vertical-boilered rollers were built around a substantial girder frame chassis, with the boiler being mounted low down between the front and rear rolls. Such designs were not common in the UK.

=== Steam donkeys ===
The traditional form of steam donkey (as a mobile winch used in the logging industry) married a vertical boiler with a steam engine on a rigid base fitted with skids for mobility. Since the ground to be traversed would be rough and rarely level, the water-level -tolerant design of the vertical boiler was an obvious choice.

=== Steam shovels and cranes ===
Construction equipment such as steam cranes and steam shovels used vertical boilers to good effect. On a rotating base, the weight of the boiler would help to counterbalance the load suspended from the shovel bucket or crane jib, mounted on the opposite side of the pivot from the boiler. The compact boiler footprint permitted smaller designs than would have been the case for a horizontal type, thus allowing use on smaller worksites; the extra height of a vertical boiler being less critical for such a generally tall machine.

=== Marine applications ===
Some steam boats, particularly smaller types such as river launches, were designed around a vertical boiler. The small footprint of the boiler permitting smaller, more space-efficient designs, with less of the usable vessel being occupied by the means of propulsion rather than the payload.

=== Stationary applications ===
Vertical types such as the Cochran boiler and the Manning boiler provided useful, small footprint, package solutions for many stationary applications, including process and space heating.
