= SS Xantho =

Steam ship in Western Australia until 1872

Coordinates: 28°11′11″S 114°14′10″E

History
- Owner: Anstruther and Leith Steamship Company (1848–1860); Robert Stewart (1871); Charles Edward Broadhurst (1871–)
- Builder: William Denny & Brothers
- Launched: 1848
- Fate: Sank 1872

General characteristics
- Type: steam ship
- Installed power: Horizontal trunk engine (1871–)
- Propulsion: Paddlewheels (1848–1871); Single screw (1871–)
- Sail plan: Schooner

SS Xantho was a steam ship used in the colony of Western Australia as a pearling transport and mothership, as a tramp steamer, carrying passengers, including Aboriginal convicts and trade goods before she sank at Port Gregory, Western Australia in 1872. She was powered by a horizontal trunk engine, and was the first steamship to operate in north-western Australia.

Although the wrecksite remained marked on charts, it was largely buried and forgotten until 1979 when it was rediscovered and re-dentified. Subsequent investigations by the Department of Maritime Archaeology at the Western Australian Museum, in concert with the Museum's Department of Conservation and Restoration saw the trunk engine recovered in 1985. In the ensuing years it was gradually restored for display at the museum.

== Operational history ==
Xantho was built in 1848 as a paddle steamer by William Denny & Brothers. The vessel was used by the Anstruther and Leith Steamship Company for crossings of the Firth of Forth between Leith and Aberdour. In 1860, she was sold and relocated to Scarborough, North Yorkshire. In July 1864, Xantho was sold again, and her register transferred to Wick, from where she was permitted to take excursions to sea.

In early 1871, Xantho was sold to metal merchant Robert Stewart of Glasgow, who replaced the paddle engines with a second-hand Crimean War-era two-cylinder, non-condensing trunk engine built (or assembled) in 1861 by John Penn. Stewart reshaped the vessel's stern and fitted a propeller to convert it from a paddle-steamer to a screw-steamer. The Crimean War-type gunboat engine and those built to the same design in the ensuing years were the first high-pressure, high-revolution, mass-produced engines made for use at sea. The type also used Whitworth's Standard Thread throughout, allowing for interchangeability of parts. The refurbished, schooner-rigged Xantho was offered for sale in October 1871 and was purchased by Charles Edward Broadhurst, a Manchester-born entrepreneur involved in colonial ventures in northwest Australia.

Xantho was brought to Western Australia via the Suez Canal and the Straits Settlements for use by Broadhurst as a transport and mother vessel for pearling operations. Using the engine to enable her to sail into difficult harbours and against wind and tide Xantho was also effectively operated as a tramp steamer, taking whatever cargoes and passengers she could. In that role she became Western Australia's first locally owned coastal steamship. Xantho subsequently made two round trips between Fremantle, Batavia (now Jakarta), Geraldton and Broadhurst's pearling camps at Port Hedland and Banningarra (on Pardoo Station). Xantho also transported a number of north-west Aboriginal men from the Aboriginal prison at Rottnest Island back to their home near Cossack and Roebourne. In November 1872, whilst travelling down from the pearling grounds to Fremantle Xantho shipped a cargo of lead ore from Port Gregory, an outlet for the Geraldine Mine on the nearby Murchison River. Overloaded, her hull badly corroded and her deck planking opened by the tropical sun, Xantho began to take on water on the way down the coast. After returning to Port Gregory she struck a sandbar and sank.

== Rediscovery and engine restoration ==
After initial salvage of loose material, the wreck lay abandoned until 1979 when, with the aid of local fishermen, it was located by the Maritime Archaeological Association of Western Australia, the volunteer wing of the Department of Maritime Archaeology at the Western Australian Museum. At the time, iron and steam shipwrecks were effectively a new class of maritime archaeological site. These sites required a new approach in both archaeological method and conservation science. A pre-disturbance survey, re-inspection and test excavation was conducted by corrosion specialists, biologists and archaeologists under the overall direction of Dr M. McCarthy.

The study found that the propulsion system and part of the stern were in uniformly good condition, although the rest of the remains were very fragile. The study also found that the engine and other prominent parts of the wreck were unlikely to last another fifty years. Anodes were applied to the engine in order to slow corrosion and commence the treatment process. In April 1985, the engine was removed from the wreck site in the context of an excavation of the stern and then transported to a treatment tank at the Museum in Fremantle. Under the direction of corrosion specialists Neil North and then Ian MacLeod, the engine was initially inundated in a solution of sodium hydroxide to prevent further corrosion, while experiments as to the most effective method of removing the 2.5 to 5 centimetres (0.98 to 1.97 in) layer of concretion from the engine iron work were performed. By March 1993, 2,500 kilograms (5,500 lb) of concretion had been removed, while 48 kilograms (106 lb) of chlorides had been extracted from the engine by electrolysis.

A working model of the engine was produced by Bob Burgess using engineering drawings of the original produced by steam engineer Noel Millar. The model has allowed the Crimean War gunboat engine type, of which the Xantho engine is the only known surviving example, to be studied in operation. The engine was then disassembled under the leadership of conservator R. (Dick) Garcia who had considerable experience in dismantling and restoring arms from WWII. As they were removed, each of the engine's components were individually re-treated before it was gradually reassembled in the Museum's exhibition gallery as a 'work in progress' display.

By 2006, the conservation and reconstruction was complete and the engine could be turned over by hand. A schematic showing the engine in action has also been produced and it can be viewed on the engine reconstruction section of the project website. The boiler relief valve, which collapsed during the treatment process was reconstructed by Alex Kilpa of the Museum's conservation unit, who also partially reconstructed what appears to be a Chaplin's Patent Distilling Apparatus with Steam Pump found on the wrecksite.

== The archaeology of SS Xantho ==
The wreck of Xantho presented many anomalous features requiring explanation, as did the engine when it was excavated from its layers of concretion and then disassembled. Apart from the hull being 23 years old and worn out, the engine was already ten years old when fitted to the former paddle-steamer, and it was found to have been running backwards to drive the ship forward. Its rotation was, as a result, contrary to the maker John Penn's requirement, resulting in increased wear. When it was disassembled by the Museum's team, loose nuts were found lying in one cylinder and repairs to the engine were found to be very rudimentary. It was also found that the pumps could not be disconnected and they ran constantly, resulting in great wear on the valve stems. They were also situated in the stern of the ship, rendering them useless when out of trim forward as Xantho was on her final voyage.

The boiler relief valve was an outdated gravity variety and not the spring type generally used at sea to avoid problems as the vessel pitched and rolled. There was no condenser for recycling the used steam back into the boiler. All this made Broadhurst's decision to purchase Xantho for use in very saline waters, on a coast where fresh water supplies were practically non-existent and where there were no engineering facilities, the nearest workshops being in Surabaya or Melbourne, difficult to understand. This in turn required an understanding of his reasons both for purchasing the vessel and the manner in which he operated the ship. This in turn led to an attempt to understand his entrepreneurial style and, given his remarkable propensity for failure, his staff and his support structures. These included his family, notably his remarkably talented wife Eliza Broadhurst and their son Florance Broadhurst.

One result of this archival research was a reassessment of Broadhurst, who like Xantho, had been roundly dismissed as two of Western Australia's greatest colonial-era failures. In respect of the re-evaluation of the ship itself, the research led to a realisation that its purchase, despite its age and its many deficiencies, was a bold and logical stroke typical of an entrepreneur with great vision, but lacking the necessary access to financial and logistical support. Being mass-produced, for example, spare parts were readily available (a spare connecting-rod was found in the ship's engine room) and being very simple, easily accessible and compact, repairs could be effected with only a rudimentary knowledge of marine engineering. On reflection it became apparent that Broadhurst also used Xantho primarily as a sailing ship and would not have used the ship's engine other than to assist the vessel when proceeding against the wind, especially when entering the often difficult tidal harbours on the north-west coast. Further, with an eye to obtaining the lucrative subsidy for operating a steamer to schedule on the coast, Broadhurst also appears to have made a point by steaming into port and thereby impressing a colonial administration crying out for steam transport on the coast. As a result of these findings, the Museum's Xantho exhibition entitled 'Steamships to Suffragettes' focusses as much on the people involved (including the Broadhurst's suffragette daughter Katharine) as it does on the engine and its conservation.

== Indigenous depictions ==
Xantho was the first steamship to operate in north-western Australia, and in that role she impacted both visually and socially on indigenous groups like the Jaburrara, Martuthunira, and Ngarluma people, who lived in the hinterland of Nickol Bay. Although no European illustrations of the ship exist, there are several examples of Aboriginal rock carvings at Inthanoona Station inland from Cossack that appear to be Xantho. Rock art at Walga Rock showing a two-masted steamship with 19th century mizzen, a tall funnel and what appear to be painted gunports ( a common decoration) or ventilation ports similar to those fitted to one of Xantho's Scottish contemporaries are dated by mid-west historian Stan Gratte to the arrival of Sammy Malay [Sammy Hassan] at Walga Rock and is also believed to depict the vessel.
