= Boiler stay =

A boiler stay is an internal structural element of a boiler. Where the shell of a boiler or other pressure vessel is made of cylindrical or (part) spherical elements, the internal pressure will be contained without distortion. However, flat surfaces of any significant size will distort under pressure, tending to bulge.

== Types ==
Stays of various types are used to support these surfaces by tying them together to resist pressure. Some boiler configurations require a great deal of staying. A large locomotive boiler may require several thousand stays to support the firebox. In water tube boilers, stays were sometimes used between their main chambers, and could themselves be water tubes. A knuckle joint is used for diagonal stays in a boiler.

A cylindrical firebox may be self-supporting without stays because of its shape.

== Gallery ==
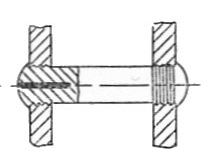
Rod stay

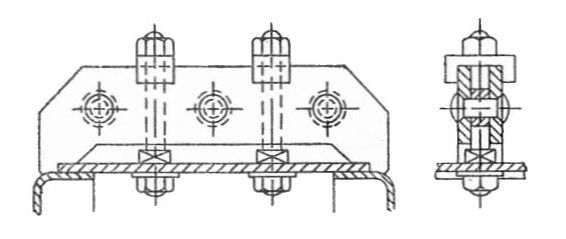
Girder stay

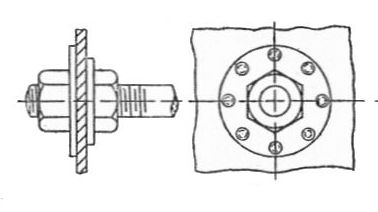
Longitudinal stay

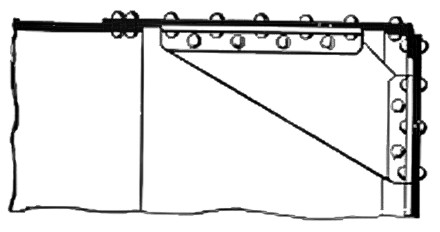
Gusset stay

== See also ==
- Boiler blowdown
