= Chaplin's patent distilling apparatus =

Early evaporator design

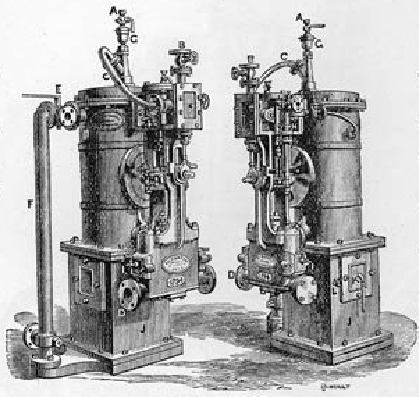
Chaplins' patent sea-water distilling apparatus

The Chaplin's patent distilling apparatus with Steam pump for circulating water attached was an early design of an evaporator, a device for producing fresh water on board ship by distillation of seawater. An example of this apparatus has been recovered from the wreck of SS Xantho (1872), an auxiliary steamship used in Australia to transport passengers and trade goods before ultimately sinking in Port Gregory, Western Australia, in 1872. It is purported that the Alexander Chaplin distiller from the Xantho wreck is the only known surviving example of a Chaplin distilling apparatus on board a vessel of this period.

== Manufacturer ==
Alexander Chaplin & Co. (also known as A.C. and Co., Alex. Chaplin & Co.) was a manufacturing syndicate based in the United Kingdom during the mid-19th century to early 20th century with its manufacturing and engineering plant facilities located at Cranstonhill Engine Works, Glasgow. Of their numerous patented and manufactured products, one of the notable devices developed was the Chaplin's Patent Distilling Apparatus with Steam pump for circulating water attached.

Founded in 1857, the administrative office of Alexander Chaplin & Co. was located at 63 Queen Victoria Street, London, England, before being taken over by Herbert Morris, LTD in 1932. Well known manufacturers, Alex. Chaplin & Co. prided themselves that their products were "always in stock or in progress". Chaplins' produced a range of steam powered industrial products including steam cranes, hoists, locomotives, pumping and winding engines, ship's deck engines and sea water distilling apparatus, used throughout the world during the 19th and 20th century. Chaplin's patent sea water distilling apparatus with steam pump attached for circulating water was a very compact and convenient apparatus, designed for marine use but capable of adaptation for land use as well.

== History ==
The Chaplin Apparatus was adopted by many important British and Continental shipping companies including P&O, Inman Line, North German Lloyd and the Hamburg American Companies. The British Navy used such apparatuses. The Board of Bureau Chiefs of the United States Navy considered supplying the cruisers USS Baltimore (C-3) and USS Philadelphia (C-4) with distilling apparatuses to provide fresh water for the boilers from distillation of sea water, but no reference was made to the Chaplin company in their reported discussions. In addition to merchant and passenger ships, US gunboats used such distillers as well.

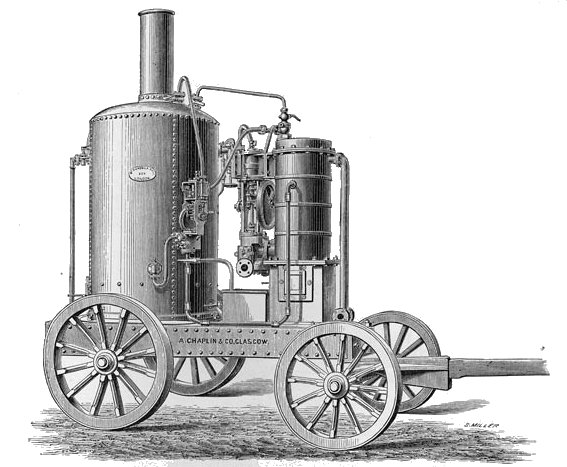
Example of Chaplin Distiller used for Land Purposes

Chaplin distillers were also used in land settings. During the Sudan Campaigns (1881–1885 and 1896–1899), British forces used the distillers to supply their soldiers with fresh drinking water in Suakin and Sudan. This supply of fresh drinking water was of utmost importance in the 1882 Anglo-Egyptian War. Similar distillers, such as Dr. Normandy's, were on a much larger scale, distilling some 12,000 gallons of water per hour, whereas the Chaplin distilling apparatus used onboard vessels produced roughly 23 gallons of fresh water per hour. Essentially, the distilled water produced for Egypt was made in a special apparatus with various forms of condenser employed. The principle for distillation is the same as the apparatus on steamships. On ships, steam is generated in one of the ships boilers then condensed, filtered and aerated in the apparatus. On land, the engines would have to be kept running in order to pump the distilled water out of the condenser.

By the order of H.M. Council on 5 December 1865, Government emigrant, troop and other passenger vessels fitted with this distilling apparatus were permitted to sail with only half the required amount of water under Section 26 of the Passengers Act 1855. This act states "Any passenger ship propelled by sails only, or by steam engines of less power than is sufficient, without the aid of sails, to propel the ship at the rate of five statute miles per hour, may be cleared out and proceed on her voyage, having on board, in tanks or casks, only half the quantity of pure water required by the said Act to be carried for the use of the passengers, provided that…there be on board such ship an efficient apparatus for distilling fresh water from salt water". This, combined with the convenience and compact size of the apparatus made the Alexander Chaplin model very popular.

In direct competition with Alexander Chaplin, Dr. Alphonse Normandy's (1809–1864) apparatus is another successful distiller. It consists of three essential parts, the evaporator, the condenser and the refrigerator. The apparatus passes a mixture of steam and gasses from the evaporator to the tubes of the condenser. Normandy's distiller was very complex in structure, consisting of many numerous working parts. With an elaborate layout and expensive cost, the distiller wasn't economically viable for smaller vessels. In France, the apparatus of Rocher and Nantes and that of Galle and Mazeline of Havre, have been "highly appreciated by French authorities and French seamen".

== Method of operation ==
For successful preparation of potable water from seawater, the following conditions of a distilling apparatus were deemed essential. First, the distilled product must be aerated so it may be immediately available for drinking and storage purposes. Second, the amount of coal used to obtain the maximum volume of drinkable water must be at a minimum expenditure level and third, the apparatus' working parts must be simple enough to prevent from breaking down and to enable unskilled attendants to safely operate. "The Alexander Chaplin distilling apparatus is among the forms of apparatus which have most fully satisfied such conditions".

== Apparatus ==
Chaplin's Distilling Apparatus in 1883 catalog

The Alexander Chaplin & Co. distilling apparatus was designed initially for use on board steam vessels where it could be supplied with steam from either the main boiler or a donkey boiler with cooling water circulation from a pump driven from the main engine or an auxiliary. The subsequent addition of a steam powered circulating pump integral with the apparatus meant it could then also be used as a standalone apparatus on any vessel equipped with an existing donkey (auxiliary) boiler, such as a sailing ship equipped with steam winches. The apparatus consisted of a coiled condensing pipe approximately 60 feet (18 m) in length placed inside a cylindrical casing filled with constantly changed cooling water. The casing was cast iron and the coils were made of copper. The coils were supplied with steam either from the exhaust of the engine, or from a feed directly from the boiler. A circulating pump, either driven from the main engine on a steam ship, or integrated with the apparatus on a sailing ship, supplied a constant stream of cooling water flowing through the condenser. A covered brass cup with small adjustable holes around the circumference was fitted at the upper end of the steam coil. In operation, a steam jet drew air in from the circumferential openings in the cup and filled the coils with a mixture of air and steam, both cooling the steam and reducing its pressure. As it passed down the coil, the air/steam mixture was further cooled by the surrounding water, and condensed as water droplets on the walls of the coil. The aerated water would collect as a clear, bright and odourless liquid at a temperature of about 13 °C (55 °F) at the bottom of the coil, to be drawn off for use. The machine could supply approximately 23 US gallons (87 L; 19 imp gal) of water per hour. "The samples of water subjected to analysis were collected at different times directly from the Patent Apparatus on board ship... and the results of my experiments with the water distilled in Alexander Chaplin & Co.'s are conclusive in showing that is of excellent quality in every particular."

The integrated circulating pump of the later arrangement could also be used as a fire engine in the event of an emergency. The outlet pipe from the cooling water chamber could be fitted with a cock, by which way the water could be directed to a fitted union to which a fire-hose could be attached.

The optimum arrangement would place the apparatus in the stokehold or anywhere below deck where a reliable steam and cooling water supply could be efficiently provided. It could also be placed on the main deck or any other convenient part of the vessel, subject to adequate water and steam supplies being maintained. As long as fuel was available to make steam, the Chaplin distiller offered a potential economic benefit in that the space and weight previously set aside for larger water tanks could be used more productively to carry additional cargo.

According to the manufacturer's specifications and a report generated by Dr. Frederick Penny PhD, F.R.S.E Professor of Chemistry, Andersonian University, Glasgow, the distiller filtered out noxious chemicals such as lead, copper, tin and iron through the use of a series of iron plates with perforated holes and matting. These plates were located in the large box-like structure at the bottom of the apparatus.

== Apparatus aboard SS Xantho ==
Precisely when the Chaplin Distiller was installed on Xantho is open to conjecture. It is known that from 1864 to 1870, Xantho operated out of Wick, West Sussex and was permitted to take excursions to sea. It is possible that this apparatus was installed during this period of time. It is more feasible however that this device was installed at a later date as part of the major refurbishing programme implemented by the metal merchant Robert Stewart, who, in 1871, completely and radically re-engineered the ship, replacing the original side paddlewheel steam propulsion with a new marine fire tube boiler and screw propulsion, utilising a secondhand Horizontal Trunk Engine designed by John Penn and Son.

=== Excavation and confirmation of identity ===
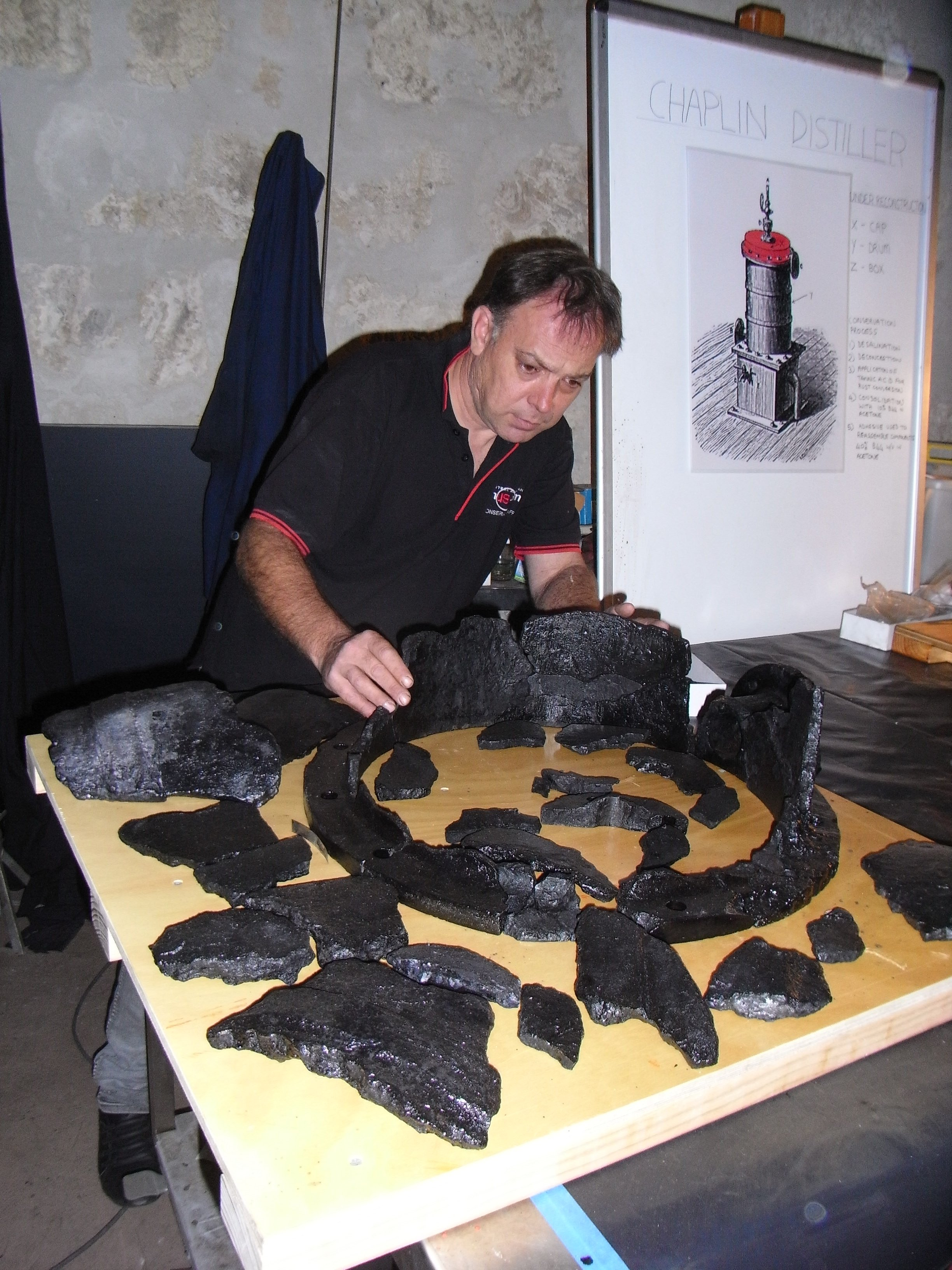
Distiller canister of SS Xantho

The Chaplin distiller was excavated from the steamship Xantho wreck site in 1994. It was found outside the hull on the port side of the vessel. It is likely that this apparatus was installed in the ship's engine space and as a result of the wreck site's natural transformation, had been displaced by the strong transverse current as the surrounding hull framing and plating gave way, falling out onto the seabed.

Initial speculation was that this may be a condenser or a heat exchanger or perhaps a circle condenser [?] but the discovery of a brass manufacturer's nameplate found whilst de-concreting the object and subsequent archival documentation has confirmed its identity to be a Chaplin distilling apparatus.

On recovery, the artefact was found to be in very fragile condition with the cast iron shell badly corroded and incomplete. Additionally there is evidence to suggest that the artefact is missing many of its mountings such as the aerator, connecting pipes and donkey engine. It is inconclusive whether these materials were removed by agents operating under the direction of the owner Charles Edward Broadhurst (1826 – 26 April 1905) in the initial salvaging of the wreck in 1872 or by treasure hunters in more recent times.

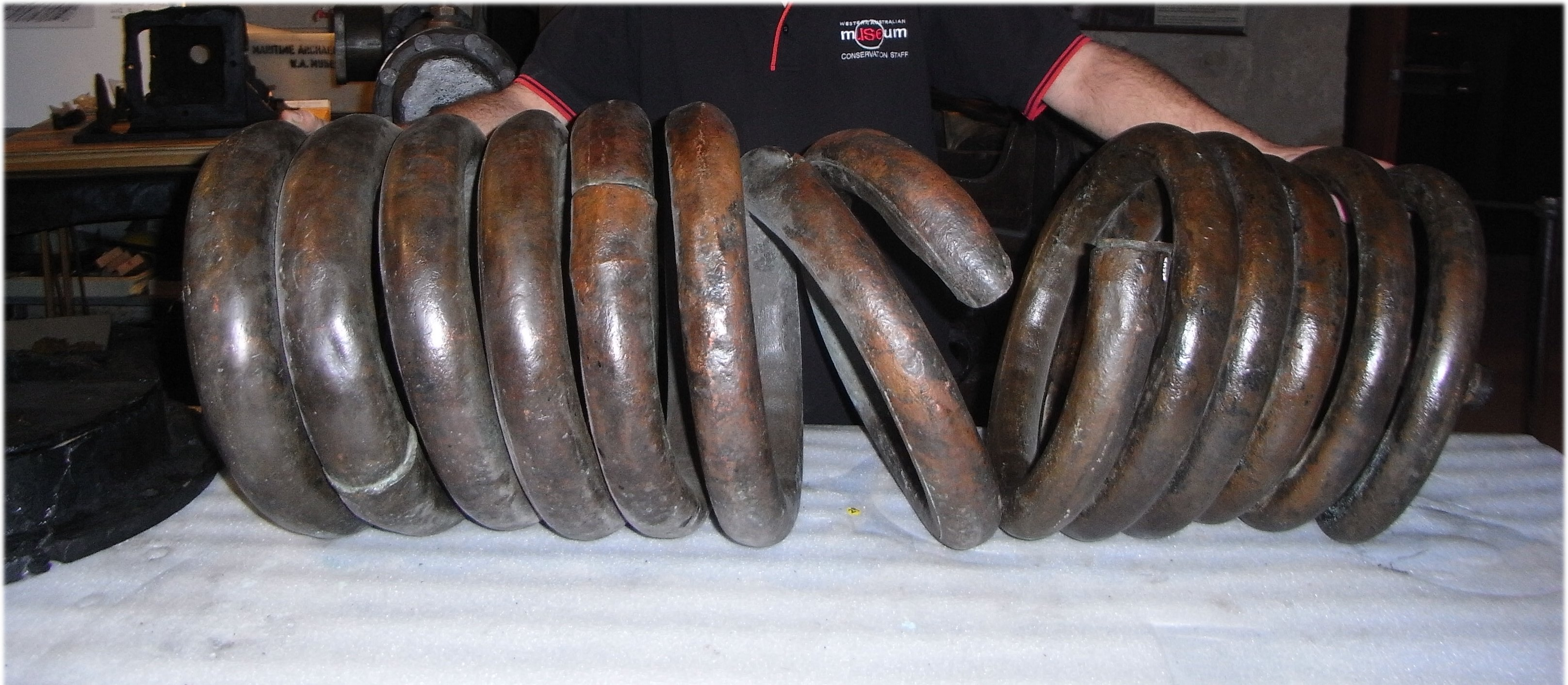
Distiller coil from SS Xantho

This Chaplin Distiller, which was damaged during the excavation and treatment processes, is currently being reconstructed at the Western Australian Museum by the Department of Maritime Archaeology. It is envisaged that this rebuilding process will be completed by 2014 and that it will be available for public viewing in the 'Steamships to Suffragettes Gallery' shortly thereafter.

Because of its fragmented state and damage to the coil it is not possible at this stage to confirm exact dimensions for this apparatus. A rough estimate would suggest something in the order of 5 ft 3 in (1.60 m) but a definitive answer will be able to be determined once it is reassembled and the coil has been correctly aligned and integrated.

The Chaplin Distilling apparatus excavated from Xantho is believed to be the only known example in existence and therefore can be regarded as a unique piece of maritime history that helps to explain how steamships and sailing vessels fitted with these devices were able to undertake prolonged voyages at sea with a minimal supply of fresh water.
