= Fire-tube boiler =

Type of boiler

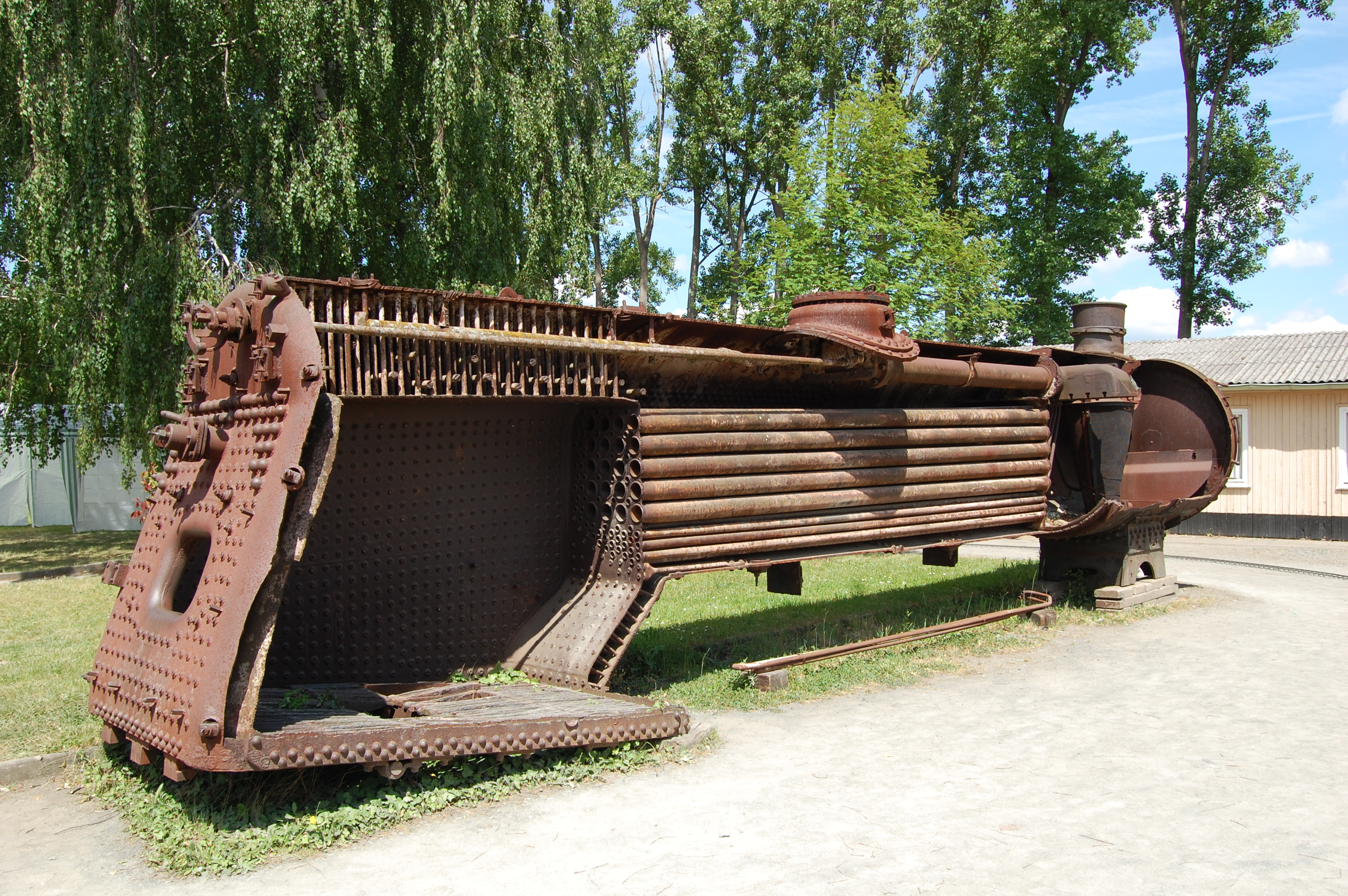
Sectioned fire-tube boiler from a DRB Class 50 locomotive. Hot flue gases created in the firebox (on the left) pass through the tubes in the centre cylindrical section, which is filled with water, to the smokebox and out of the chimney (stack) at far right. The steam collects along the top of the boiler and in the steam dome roughly halfway along the top, where it then flows into the large pipe seen running forward. It is then divided into each side and runs downward in the steam chest (at the rear of the smoke box), where it is then admitted into the cylinders by means of valves.

A fire-tube boiler is a type of boiler invented in 1828 by Marc Seguin, in which hot gases pass from a fire through one or more tubes running through a sealed container of water. The heat of the gases is transferred through the walls of the tubes by thermal conduction, heating the water and ultimately creating steam.

The fire-tube boiler developed as the third of the four major historical types of boilers: low-pressure tank or "haystack" boilers, flued boilers with one or two large flues, fire-tube boilers with many small tubes, and high-pressure water-tube boilers. Their advantage over flued boilers with a single large flue is that the many small tubes offer far greater heating surface area for the same overall boiler volume. The general construction is as a tank of water penetrated by tubes that carry the hot flue gases from the fire. The tank is usually cylindrical for the most part—being the strongest practical shape for a pressurized container—and this cylindrical tank may be either horizontal or vertical.

This type of boiler was used on virtually all steam locomotives in the horizontal "locomotive" form. This has a cylindrical barrel containing the fire tubes, but also has an extension at one end to house the "firebox". This firebox has an open base to provide a large grate area and often extends beyond the cylindrical barrel to form a rectangular or tapered enclosure. The horizontal fire-tube boiler is also typical of marine applications, using the Scotch boiler; thus, these boilers are commonly referred to as "scotch-marine" or "marine" type boilers. Vertical boilers have also been built of the multiple fire-tube type, although these are comparatively rare; most vertical boilers were either flued, or with cross water-tubes.

== Operation ==
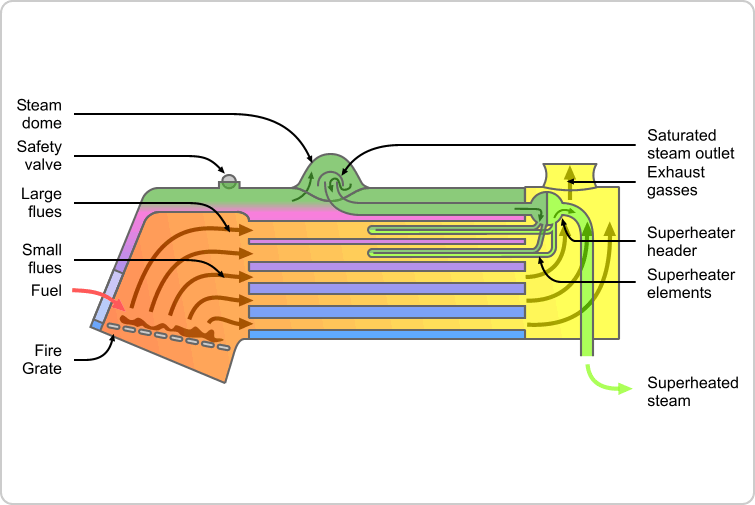
Schematic diagram of a "locomotive" type fire-tube boiler

In the locomotive-type boiler, fuel is burnt in a firebox to produce hot combustion gases. The firebox is surrounded by a cooling jacket of water connected to the long, cylindrical boiler shell. The hot gases are directed along a series of fire tubes, or flues, that penetrate the boiler and heat the water thereby generating saturated ("wet") steam. The steam rises to the highest point of the boiler, the steam dome, where it is collected. The dome is the site of the regulator that controls the exit of steam from the boiler.

In the locomotive boiler, the saturated steam is very often passed into a superheater, back through the larger flues at the top of the boiler, to dry the steam and heat it to superheated steam. The superheated steam is directed to the steam engine's cylinders or very rarely to a turbine to produce mechanical work. Exhaust gases are fed out through a chimney, and may be used to pre-heat the feed water to increase the efficiency of the boiler.

Draught for firetube boilers, particularly in marine applications, is usually provided by a tall smokestack. In all steam locomotives since Stephenson's Rocket, additional draught is supplied by directing exhaust steam from the cylinders into the smokestack through a blastpipe, to provide a partial vacuum. Modern industrial boilers use fans to provide forced or induced draughting of the boiler.

Another major advance in the Rocket was large numbers of small-diameter firetubes (a multi-tubular boiler) instead of a single large flue. This greatly increased the surface area for heat transfer, allowing steam to be produced at a much higher rate. Without this, steam locomotives could never have developed effectively as powerful prime movers.

== Types ==
For more details on the related ancestor type, see Flued boilers.

=== Cornish boiler ===
The earliest form of fire-tube boiler was Richard Trevithick's "high-pressure" Cornish boiler. This is a long horizontal cylinder with a single large flue containing the fire. The fire itself was on an iron grating placed across this flue, with a shallow ashpan beneath to collect the non-combustible residue. Although considered as low-pressure (perhaps 25 pounds per square inch (170 kPa)) today, the use of a cylindrical boiler shell permitted a higher pressure than the earlier "haystack" boilers of Newcomen's day. As the furnace relied on natural draught (air flow), a tall chimney was required at the far end of the flue to encourage a good supply of air (oxygen) to the fire.

For efficiency, the boiler was commonly encased beneath by a brick-built chamber. Flue gases were routed through this, outside the iron boiler shell, after passing through the fire-tube and so to a chimney that was now placed at the front face of the boiler.

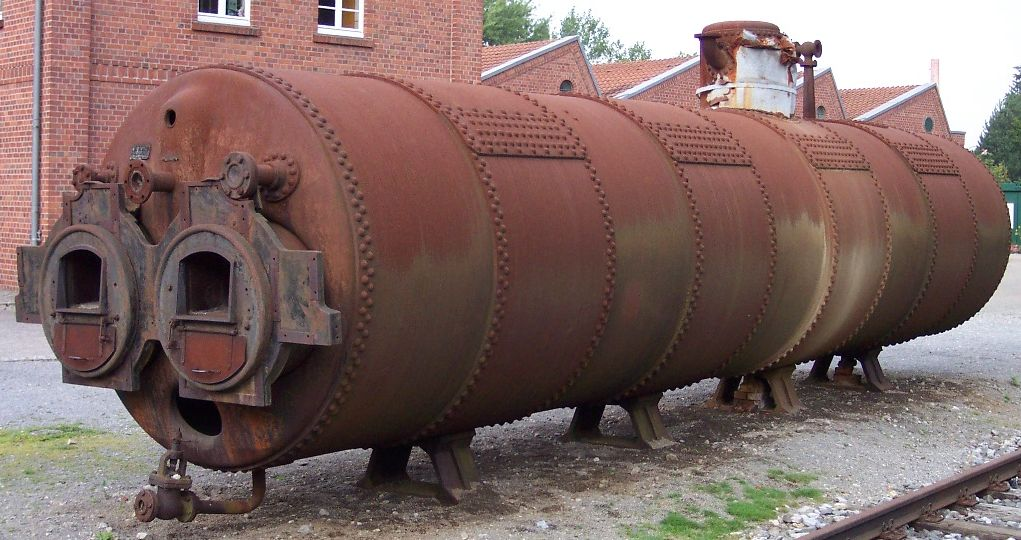
Lancashire boiler in Germany

=== Lancashire boiler ===
The Lancashire boiler is similar to the Cornish, but has two large flues containing the fires. It was the invention of William Fairbairn in 1844, from a theoretical consideration of the thermodynamics of more efficient boilers that led him to increase the furnace grate area relative to the volume of water.

Later developments added Galloway tubes (after their inventor, patented in 1848), crosswise water tubes across the flue, thus increasing the heated surface area. As these are short tubes of large diameter and the boiler continues to use a relatively low pressure, this is still not considered to be a water-tube boiler. The tubes are tapered, simply to make their installation through the flue easier.

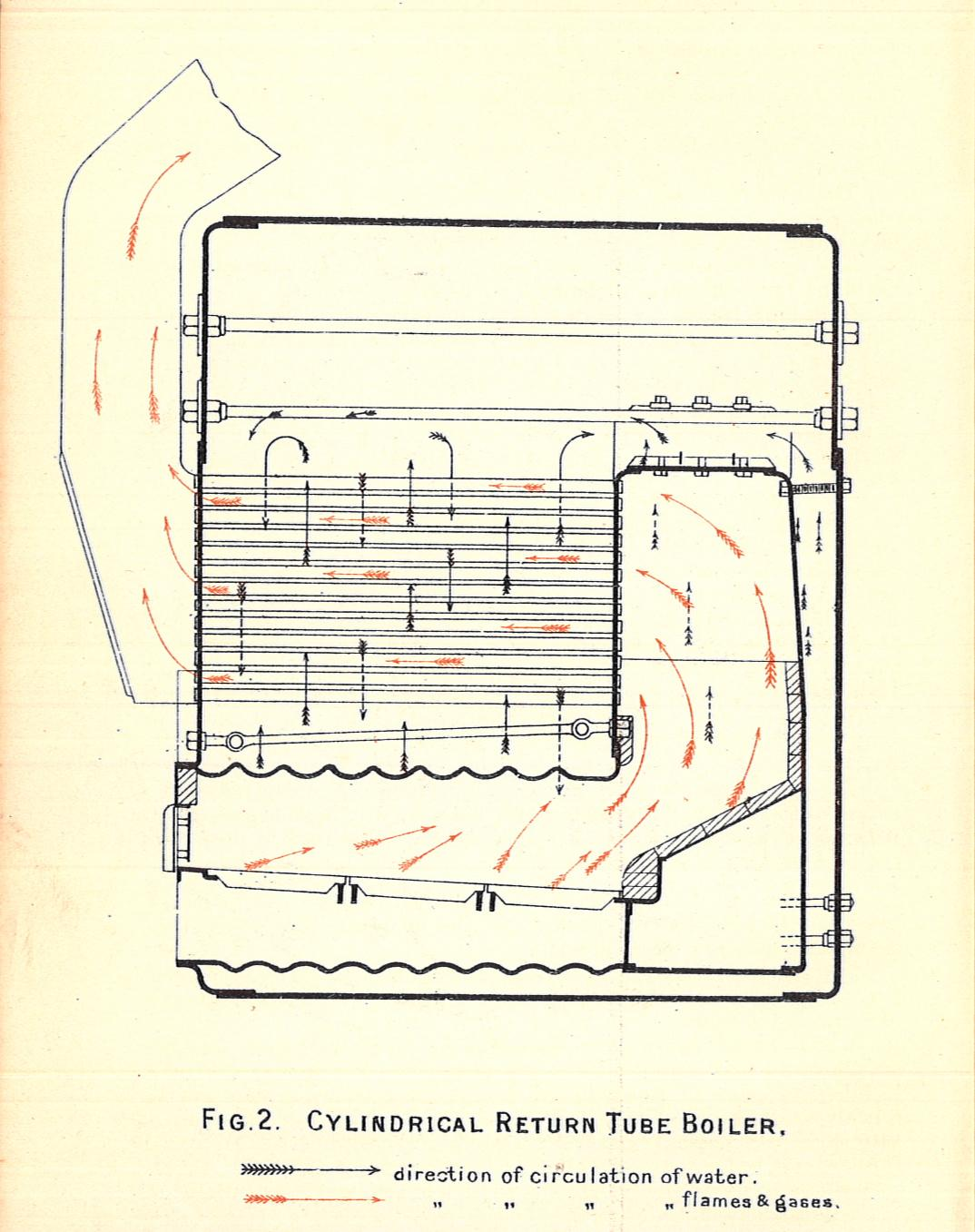
Side-section of a Scotch marine boiler: the arrows show direction of flue gas flow; the combustion chamber is on the right, the smokebox on the left.

=== Scotch marine boiler ===
The Scotch marine boiler differs dramatically from its predecessors in using a large number of small-diameter tubes. This gives a far greater heating surface area for the volume and weight. The furnace remains a single large-diameter tube with the many small tubes arranged above it. They are connected together through a combustion chamber – an enclosed volume contained entirely within the boiler shell – so that the flow of flue gas through the firetubes is from back to front. An enclosed smokebox covering the front of these tubes leads upwards to the chimney or funnel. Typical Scotch boilers had a pair of furnaces, larger ones had three. Above this size, such as for large steam ships, it was more usual to install multiple boilers.

=== Locomotive boiler ===
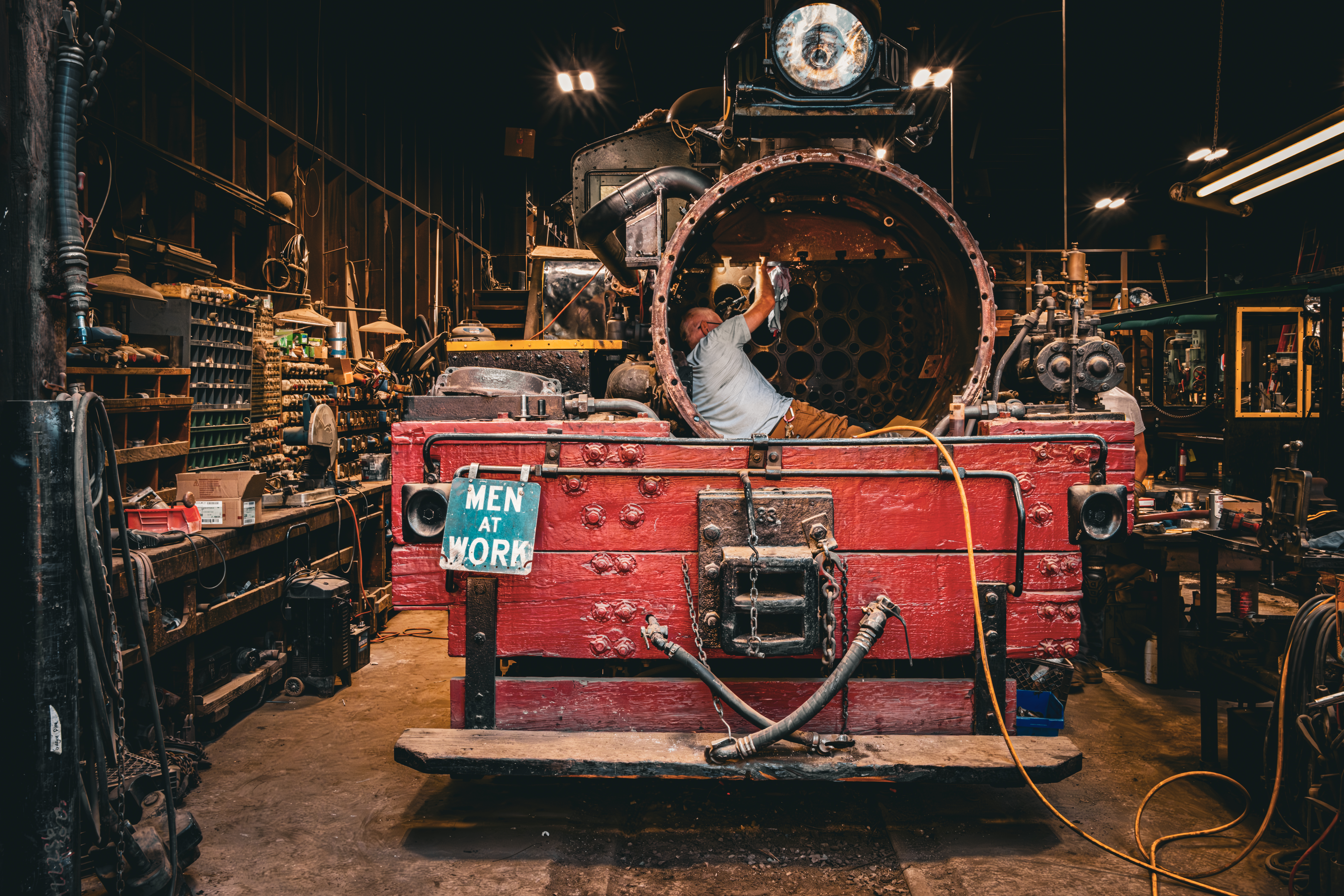
Worker tending to a Shay locomotive boiler.

A locomotive boiler has three main components: a double-walled firebox; a horizontal, cylindrical "boiler barrel" containing a large number of small flue-tubes; and a smokebox with chimney, for the exhaust gases. The boiler barrel contains larger flue-tubes to carry the superheater elements, where present. Forced draught is provided in the locomotive boiler by injecting exhausted steam back into the exhaust via a blast pipe in the smokebox.

Locomotive-type boilers are also used in traction engines, steam rollers, portable engines and some other steam road vehicles. The inherent strength of the boiler means it is used as the basis for the vehicle: all the other components, including the wheels, are mounted on brackets attached to the boiler. It is rare to find superheaters designed into this type of boiler, and they are generally much smaller (and simpler) than railway locomotive types.

The locomotive-type boiler is also a characteristic of the overtype steam wagon, the steam-powered fore-runner of the truck. In this case, however, heavy girder frames make up the load-bearing chassis of the vehicle, and the boiler is attached to this.

Taper boiler

Certain railway locomotive boilers are tapered from a larger diameter at the firebox end to a smaller diameter at the smokebox end. This reduces weight and improves water circulation. Many later Great Western Railway and London, Midland and Scottish Railway locomotives were designed or modified to take taper boilers.

=== Vertical fire-tube boiler ===
A vertical fire-tube boiler (VFT), colloquially known as the "vertical boiler", has a vertical cylindrical shell, containing several vertical flue tubes.

=== Horizontal return tubular boiler ===
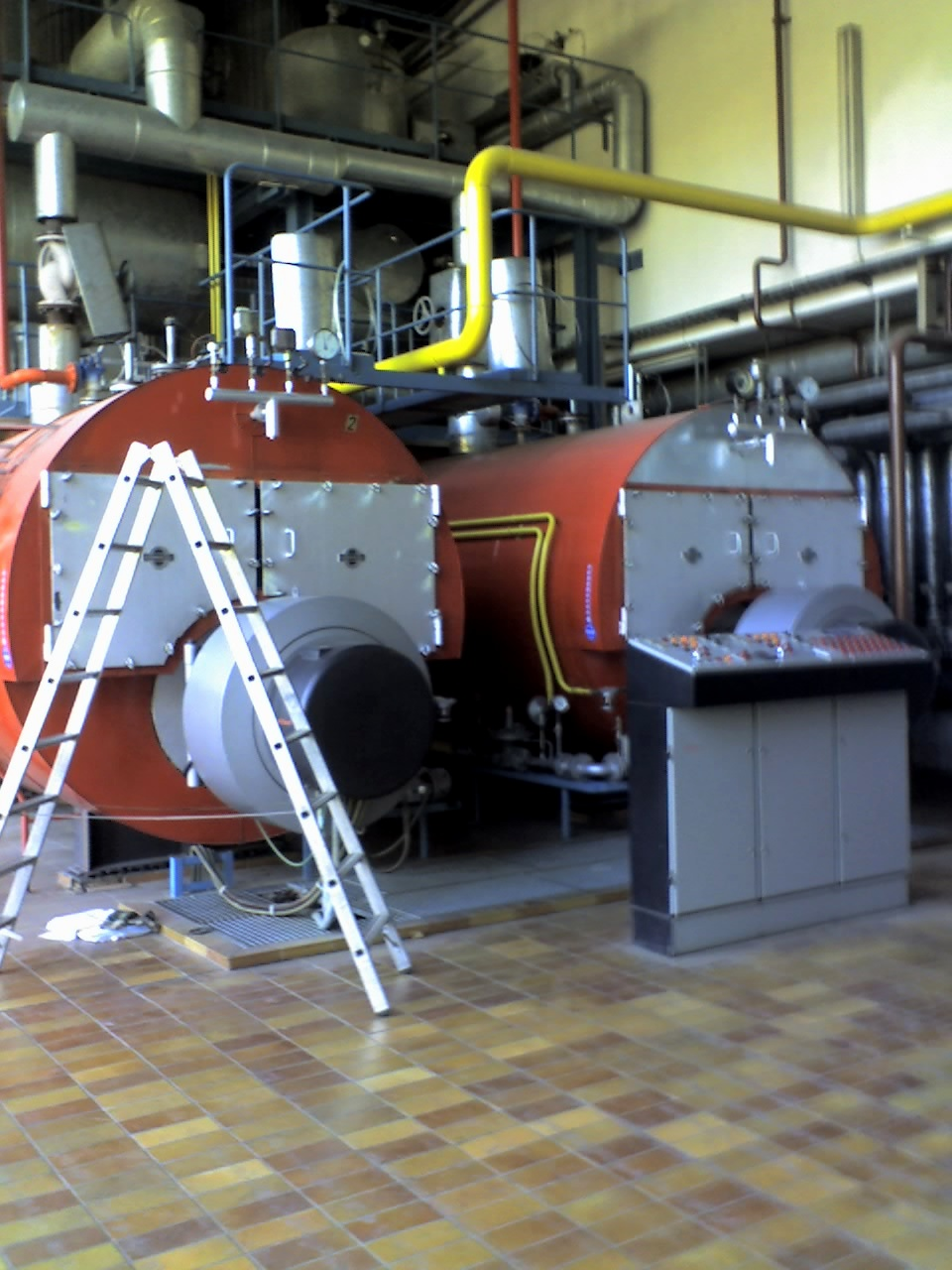
Horizontal return tubular boilers from the Staatsbad Bad Steben GmbH

Horizontal return tubular boiler (HRT) has a horizontal cylindrical shell, containing several horizontal flue tubes, with the fire located directly below the boiler's shell, usually within a brickwork setting

=== Admiralty-type direct tube boiler ===
Extensively used by Britain, before and in the early days of ironclads, the only protected place was below the waterline, sometimes under an armoured deck, so to fit below short decks, the tubes were not led back above the furnace but continued straight from it with keeping the combustion chamber in between the two. Hence the name, and considerably reduced diameter, compared to the ubiquitous Scotch or return tube boiler. It was not a great success and its use was being abandoned after the introduction of stronger side armouring – “the furnace crowns, being very near the water-level, are much more liable to over-heating. Further, on account of the length of the boiler, for an equal angle of inclination, the effect on the water-level is much greater. Finally, the unequal expansion of the various parts of the boiler is more pronounced, especially at the top and bottom, due to the increased ratio between the length and the diameter of the boiler; the local strains are also more severe on account of the comparatively feeble circulation in long and low boilers.” All these also resulted in a shorter life. Also, the same length of a combustion chamber was much less effective on a direct tube than on a return tube boiler, at least without baffling.

=== Immersion fired boiler ===
The immersion fired boiler is a single-pass fire-tube boiler that was developed by Sellers Engineering in the 1940s. It has only firetubes, functioning as a furnace and combustion chamber also, with multiple burner nozzles injecting premixed air and natural gas under pressure. It claims reduced thermal stresses, and lacks refractory brickwork completely due to its construction.

== Variations ==
=== Water tubes ===
Fire-tube boilers sometimes have water-tubes as well, to increase the heating surface. A Cornish boiler may have several water-tubes across the diameter of the flue (this is common in steam launches). A locomotive boiler with a wide firebox may have arch tubes or thermic syphons. As firebox technology developed, it was found that placing a baffle of firebricks (heat-resistant bricks) inside the firebox to direct the flow of hot flue gasses up into the top of the firebox before it flowed into the fire tubes increased efficiency by equalizing the heat between upper and lower fire tubes. To hold these in place, a metal bracket was used, but to prevent these brackets from burning and eroding away they were built as water tubes, with cool water from the bottom of the boiler moving upwards by convection as it heated, and carrying the heat away before the metal reached its failure temperature.

Another technique for increasing the heating surface is to include internal rifling inside the boiler tubes (also known as Serve tubes).

Not all shell boilers raise steam; some are designed specifically for heating pressurized water.

=== Reverse flame ===
In homage to the Lancashire design, modern shell boilers can come with a twin furnace design. A more recent development has been the reverse flame design where the burner fires into a blind furnace and the combustion gasses double back on themselves. This results in a more compact design and less pipework.

=== Package boiler ===
The term "package" boiler evolved in the early- to mid-20th century; it is used to describe residential heating boilers delivered to the installation site with all insulation, electrical panels, valves, gauges, and fuel burners already assembled by the manufacturer. Other delivery methods more closely resemble prior practice from the coal burning era, when other components were added on-site to either a pre-assembled pressure vessel, or to a "knock-down" boiler, where the pressure vessel is delivered as a set of castings to be assembled on-site. As a general rule, factory assembly is much more cost-effective and the packaged boiler is the preferred option for domestic use. Part-assembled deliveries are only used when necessary because of access limitations - e.g. when the only access to a basement installation site is down a narrow flight of stairs.

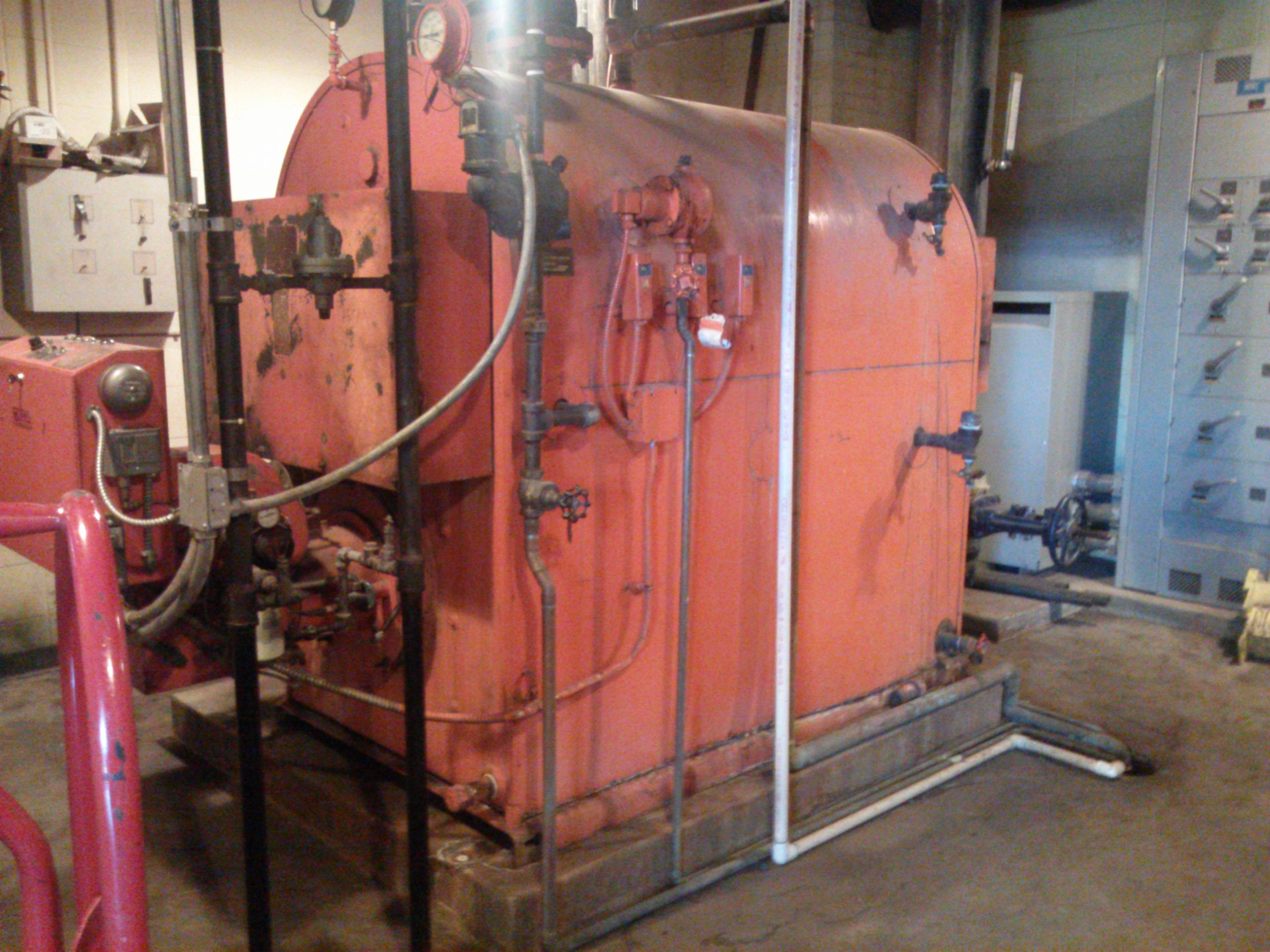
Kewanee Gas-Fired Packaged Fire-Tube Boiler from 1974 rated at 25 horsepower

== Safety considerations ==
Because the fire-flume boiler itself is the pressure vessel, it requires a number of safety features to prevent mechanical failure. Boiler steam explosions, which are a type of BLEVE (Boiling Liquid Expanding Vapor Explosion), can be devastating.

- Safety valves release steam before a dangerous pressure can be built up
- Fusible plugs over the firebox melt at a temperature lower than that of the firebox plates, thereby warning the operators by the noisy escape of steam if the water level is too low to cool the firebox crown safely.
- Stays, or ties, physically link the firebox and boiler casing, preventing them from warping. Since any corrosion is hidden, the stays may have longitudinal holes, called tell-tales, drilled in them which leak before they become unsafe.

The fire-tube type boiler that was used in the Stanley Steamer automobile had several hundred tubes which were weaker than the outer shell of the boiler, making an explosion virtually impossible as the tubes would fail and leak long before the boiler exploded. In nearly 100 years since Stanley boilers were first produced, not one has ever exploded.

== Economics and efficiencies ==
=== Excessive cycling ===
Each time a boiler cycles off and on, it can lose efficiency. When the fire starts combustion efficiency is usually lower until steady state conditions prevail. When the fire stops the warm chimney continues to draw additional air from the interior space until it cools.

Excessive cycling can be minimized

- Modulating boilers can run longer (at firing rates that match the loads) than the non-modulating boilers (which operate at the full firing rate).
  - By using condensing modulating boilers.
  - By using non-condensing modulating boiler.
  - By setting the controls (thermostats or controller with temperature sensors) with greater temperature differentials between STOP and START.
- At Non-Condensing Boilers make provisions so that minimum return water temperature of 130 °F (54 °C) to 150 °F (66 °C) to the boiler to avoid fireside corrosion.
  - By setting the MINIMUM OFF times at 8 to 15 minutes. For comfort heating loads, short time intervals do not usually trigger occupant complaints.

Common provisions are to provide a primary piping loop with pump(s) and a secondary piping loop with pump(s); and either a variable speed controlled pump to transfer water from the primary loop to the secondary loop, or a 3-way valve to divert water from the secondary loop to the primary loop.

==== Fireside corrosion in non-condensing boilers ====
A minimum return water temperature of 130 °F (54 °C) to 150 °F (66 °C) to the boiler, depending on the specific design, is used to avoid condensing water vapor from the flue gas and dissolving CO_{2} and SO_{2} from the flue gasses forming carbonic and sulfuric acid, a corrosive fluid that damages the heat exchanger.

=== Condensing boilers ===
Condensing boilers can be 2% or more efficient at lower firing rates by extracting the heat of vaporization from the water vapor in the flue gases. The efficiency increase depends on the fuel and the available energy to be recovered as a fraction of the total. Methane flue gas containing more available energy to recover than propane or fuel oil relatively less. The condensed water is corrosive due to dissolved carbon dioxide and sulfur oxides from the flue and must be neutralized before disposal.

Condensing boilers have a higher seasonal efficiency, typically 84% to 92%, than non-condensing boilers typically 70% to 75%. The seasonal efficiency is an overall efficiency of the boiler over the entire heating season as opposed to the combustion efficiency which is the boiler's efficiency when actively fired, which excludes standing losses. The higher seasonal efficiency is partly because the lower boiler temperature used to condense the flue gas reduces standing losses during the off cycle. The lower boiler temperature precludes a condensing steam boiler and requires lower radiator temperatures in water systems.

The higher efficiency of operating in the condensing region isn't always available. To produce satisfactory domestic hot water frequently requires boiler water temperature higher than allows effective condensing on the heat exchanger surface. During cold weather the building's radiator surface area is usually not large enough to deliver enough heat at low boiler temperatures so the boiler's control raises the boiler temperature as required to meet heating demand. These two factors account for most of the variability of the efficiency gains experienced at different installations.

== Maintenance ==
An intensive schedule of maintenance is needed to keep a high pressure railway steam boiler in safe condition.

=== Daily inspection ===
The tube plates, the fusible plug and the heads of the firebox stays should be checked for leaks. The correct operation of the boiler fittings, especially the water gauges and water feed mechanisms, should be confirmed. Steam pressure should be raised to the level at which the safety valves lift and compared with the indication of the pressure gauge.

=== Washout ===
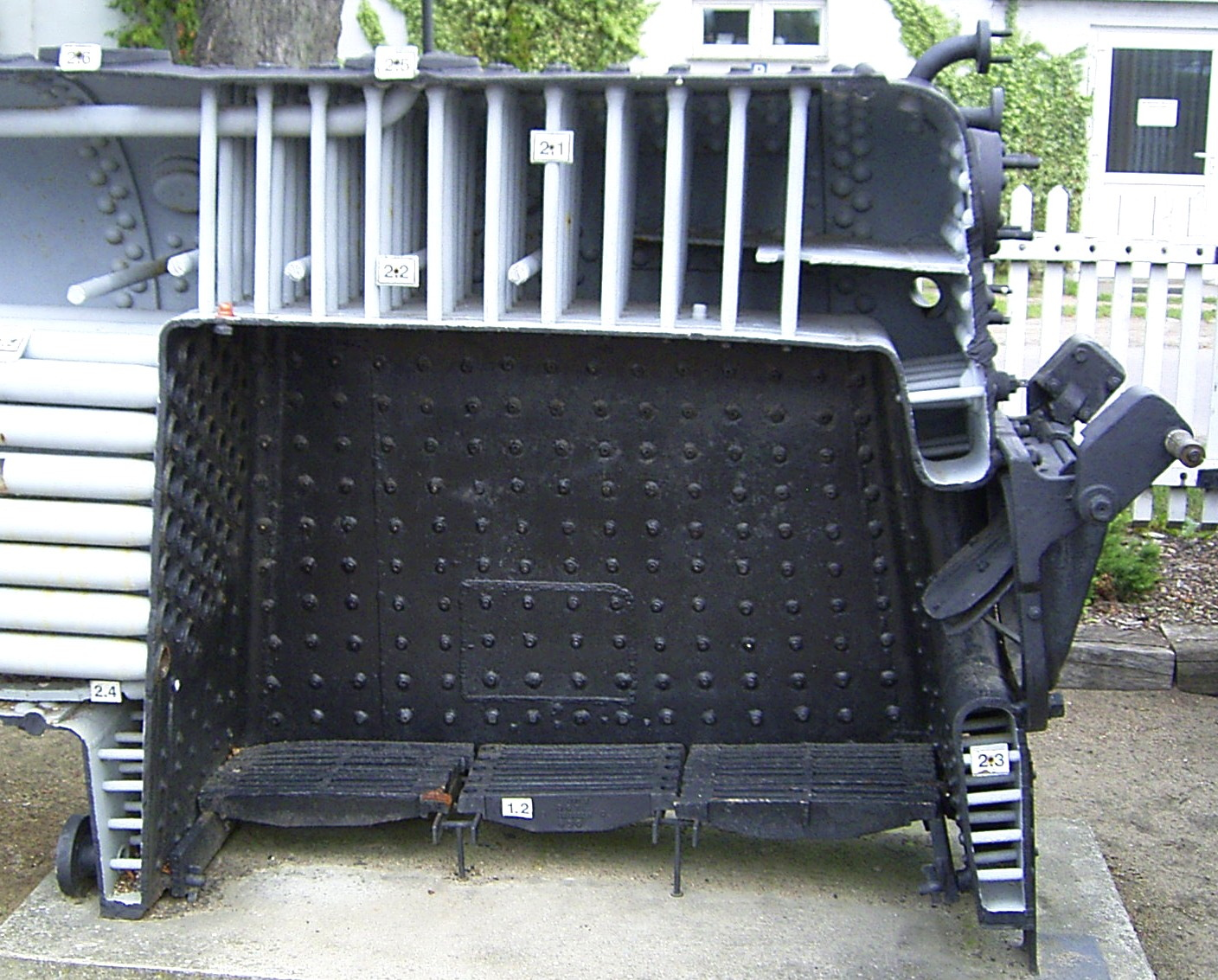
Cutaway of locomotive boiler. Note the narrow water spaces around the firebox and the "mudhole" for access to the crown sheet: these areas require special attention during washout

The working life of a locomotive boiler is considerably extended if it is spared from a constant cycle of cooling and heating. Historically, a locomotive would be kept “in steam” continuously for a period of about eight to ten days, and then allowed to cool sufficiently for a hot-water boiler washout. The schedule for express engines was based on mileage. Today's preserved locomotives are not usually kept continuously in steam and the recommended washout interval is now fifteen to thirty days, but anything up to 180 days is possible.

The process starts with a “blowdown” while some pressure remains in the boiler, then the draining away of all the boiler water through the “mudholes” at the base of the firebox and the removal of all the “washout plugs”. Scale is then jetted or scraped from the interior surfaces using a high-pressure water jet and rods of soft metal, such as copper. Areas particularly susceptible to scale buildup, such as the firebox crown and narrow water spaces around the firebox, are given special attention. The inside of the boiler is inspected by sighting through the plug holes, with a particular check paid to the integrity of the firetubes, firebox crown and stays and absence of pitting or cracking of the boiler plates. The gauge glass cocks and tubes and fusible plug should be cleared of scale; if the core of the fusible plug shows signs of calcination the item should be replaced.

On reassembly care should be taken that the threaded plugs are replaced in their original holes: the tapers can vary as a result of rethreading. The mudhole door gaskets, if of asbestos, should be renewed but those made of lead may be reused; special instructions are in force for the disposal of these harmful materials. Many boilers today make use of high temperature synthetics for the gaskets for both working environments and in preservation service as these materials are safer than the historic options. At large maintenance facilities the boiler would have been both washed and refilled with very hot water from an external supply to bring the locomotive back to service more quickly.

=== Periodic examination ===
Typically an annual inspection, this would require the removal and check of external fittings, such as the injectors, safety valves and pressure gauge. High-pressure copper pipework can suffer from work hardening in use and become dangerously brittle: it may be necessary to treat these by annealing before refitting. A hydraulic pressure test on the boiler and pipework may also be called for.

=== General overhaul ===
In the UK the specified maximum interval between full overhauls is ten years. To enable a full inspection the boiler is lifted from the locomotive frame and the lagging removed. All firetubes are removed for checking or replacement. All fittings are removed for overhaul. Before returning to use a qualified examiner will check the boiler's fitness for service and issue a safety certificate valid for ten years.

In the United States, a 1472 service day or 15 year calendar year (whichever comes first) service limit is imposed on most steam locomotives. After this limit is reached, the locomotive must be disassembled for inspections and any necessary repairs made.
