= Steam–electric locomotive =

Steam–electric locomotive may refer to:

- Heilmann locomotive, an experimental steam locomotives using electric transmission
- Steam turbine locomotive with electric transmission, a locomotive that is powered by steam turbines and can drive a traction motor by turning an electric generator
- Electric–steam locomotive, a locomotive that makes use of electric heating to generate steam
