= Boiler (disambiguation) =

A boiler is a device for heating fluid, such as water.

Boiler may also refer to:

- Boiler (power generation), a device that boils liquid to generate power
- Boiler (water heating), a device for heating water
- "Boiler" (song), a 2000 song by Limp Bizkit
- "The Boiler", a 1982 song by Rhoda Dakar and the Specials

== See also ==
- Electric boiler
- Pot boiler
- Steam generator (disambiguation)
