= Jamshed Jiji Irani =

Indian industrialist (1936–2022)

- Born: 2 June 1936
- Died: 31 October 2022 (aged 86); Jamshedpur, Jharkhand, India
- Education: University of Sheffield; Nagpur University
- Employer(s): Tata Steel; British Iron and Steel Research Association
- Awards: Padma Bhushan; Knight Commander of the Order of the British Empire

Jamshed Jiji Irani (2 June 1936 – 31 October 2022) was an Indian industrialist. Educated in Metallurgy, he joined British Iron and Steel Research Association. Later he joined Tata Steel from which he retired in 2007 as the Director. Later he served on the boards of various Tata group companies and others. He received the Padma Bhushan in 2007.

== Biography ==
Irani was born on 2 June 1936. He completed a Bachelor of Science degree from Science College, Nagpur in 1956 and Master of Science degree in Geology from the Nagpur University in 1958. He completed Masters in Metallurgy in 1960 and PhD in Metallurgy in 1963 from University of Sheffield, UK. He joined British Iron and Steel Research Association as a senior scientific officer in Sheffield in 1963. He was elevated as the head of Physical Metallurgy Division there. Later he returned to India and joined The Tata Iron and Steel Company (TISCO, now Tata Steel) in 1968 as an assistant to the Director in-charge of Research and Development. He was promoted as the general superintendent in 1978, general manager in 1979, president in 1985, Managing Director in 1992 and the Director in 1998. He retired from the Tata Steel in 2001.

Irani joined the board of Tata Motors in June 1993 and also served as the director with Tata Sons. In 2004, the government appointed him as the Chairman of the Expert Committee for formation of the new Companies Act of India. He retired from all the posts of Tata companies in 2011. He was the Chairman of Board of Governors at Indian Institute of Management, Lucknow. He and his sister Diana Hormusjee have instituted Jiji Irani Challenge Cup; a cricket tournament organised by Zorostrian Club of Secunderabad; in memory of their father.

== Awards ==
Irani was conferred an honorary knighthood (KBE) by Queen Elizabeth II in 1997. He received the Padma Bhushan in 2007 from Government of India. He was appointed an International Fellow of the Royal Academy of Engineering in 1996.
