= Industrial furnace =

Device used for providing heat in industrial applications

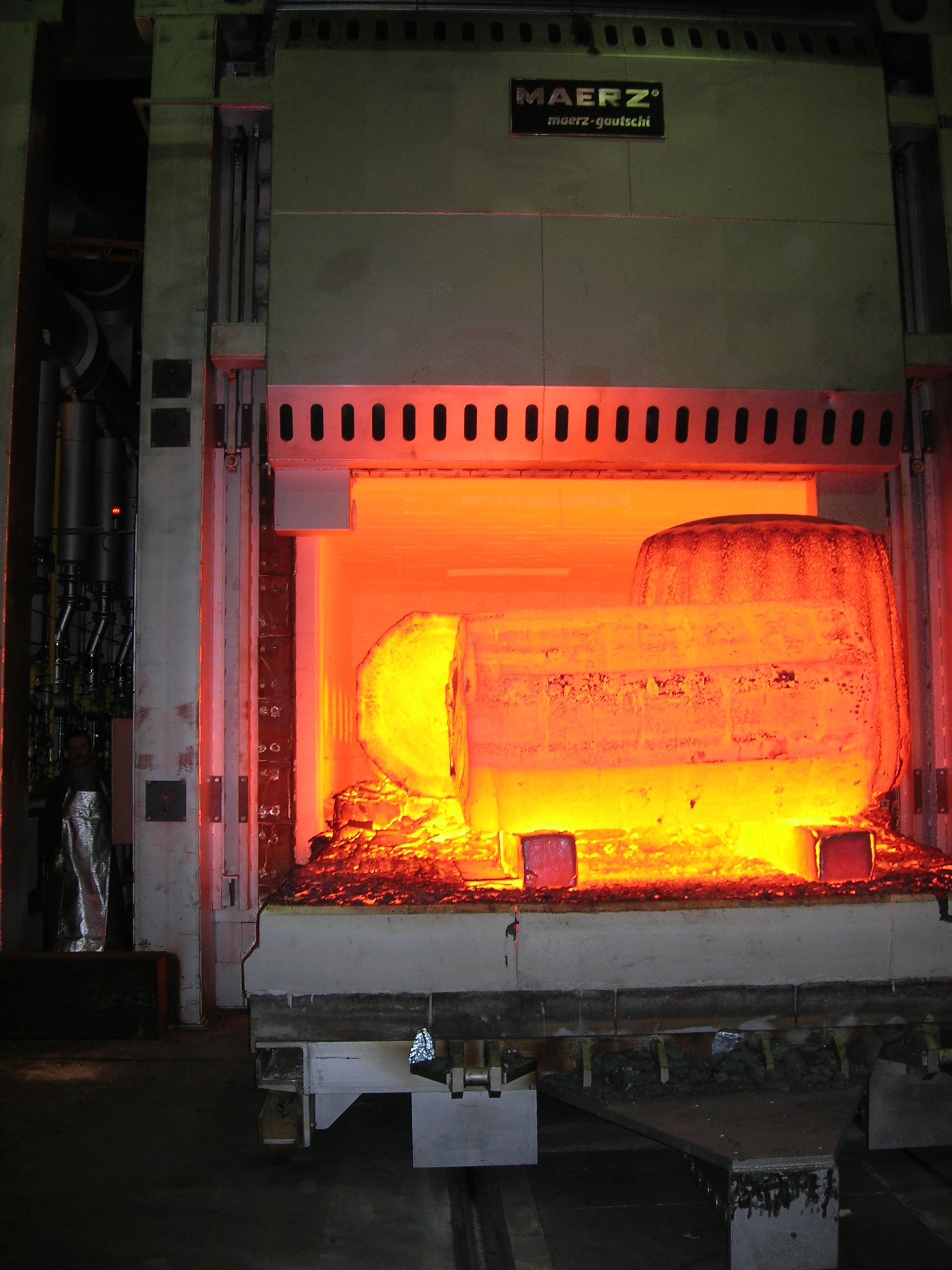
An industrial chamber furnace, used to heat steel billets for open-die forging

An industrial furnace is a device used to provide heat for an industrial process, typically operating at temperatures above 400 degrees Celsius. These furnaces generate heat by combusting fuel with air or oxygen, or through electrical energy, and are used across various industries for applications such as chemical reactions, cremation, oil refining, glasswork, and metallurgy. The residual heat is expelled as flue gas.

While the term industrial furnace encompasses a wide range of high-temperature equipment, one specific type is the direct fired heater, also known as a direct fired furnace or process furnace. Direct fired heaters are primarily used in refinery and petrochemical applications to efficiently transfer heat to process fluids by means of combustion. Unlike other industrial furnaces used in metallurgy, direct fired heaters are optimized for precise temperature control and high thermal efficiency in hydrocarbon processing.

Industrial furnaces are designed according to international standards, with some of the most common being ISO 13705 (Petroleum and natural gas industries — Fired heaters for general refinery service) and American Petroleum Institute (API) Standard 560 (Fired Heater for General Refinery Service).

== Overview ==
Schematic diagram of an industrial process furnace

Fuel flows into the burner and is burnt with air provided from an air blower. There can be more than one burner in a particular furnace which can be arranged in cells which heat a particular set of tubes. Burners can also be floor mounted, wall mounted or roof mounted depending on design. The flames heat up the tubes, which in turn heat the fluid inside in the first part of the furnace known as the radiant section or firebox. In this chamber where combustion takes place, the heat is transferred mainly by radiation to tubes around the fire in the chamber.

The fluid to be heated passes through the tubes and is thus heated to the desired temperature. The gases from the combustion are known as flue gas. After the flue gas leaves the firebox, most furnace designs include a convection section where more heat is recovered before venting to the atmosphere through the flue gas stack. (HTF=Heat Transfer Fluid. Industries also use their furnaces to heat a secondary fluid with special additives like anti-rust and high heat transfer efficiency. This heated fluid is then circulated round the whole plant to heat exchangers to be used wherever heat is needed instead of directly heating the product line as the product or material may be volatile or prone to cracking at the furnace temperature.)

== Components ==
=== Radiant section ===
Middle of radiant section

The radiant section is where the tubes receive almost all its heat by radiation from the flame. In a vertical, cylindrical furnace, the tubes are vertical. Tubes can be vertical or horizontal, placed along the refractory wall, in the middle, etc., or arranged in cells. Studs are used to hold the insulation together and on the wall of the furnace. They are placed about 1 ft (300 mm) apart in this picture of the inside of a furnace.

The tubes, shown below, which are reddish brown from corrosion, are carbon steel tubes and run the height of the radiant section. The tubes are a distance away from the insulation so radiation can be reflected to the back of the tubes to maintain a uniform tube wall temperature. Tube guides at the top, middle and bottom hold the tubes in place.

=== Convection section ===
Convection section

The convection section is located above the radiant section where it is cooler to recover additional heat. Heat transfer takes place by convection here, and the tubes are finned to increase heat transfer. The first three tube rows in the bottom of the convection section and at the top of the radiant section is an area of bare tubes (without fins) and are known as the shield section ("shock tubes"), so named because they are still exposed to plenty of radiation from the firebox and they also act to shield the convection section tubes, which are normally of less resistant material from the high temperatures in the firebox.

The area of the radiant section just before flue gas enters the shield section and into the convection section called the bridgezone. A crossover is the tube that connects from the convection section outlet to the radiant section inlet. The crossover piping is normally located outside so that the temperature can be monitored and the efficiency of the convection section can be calculated. The sightglass at the top allows personnel to see the flame shape and pattern from above and visually inspect if flame impingement is occurring. Flame impingement happens when the flame touches the tubes and causes small isolated spots of very high temperature.

=== Radiant coil ===
This is a series of tubes horizontal/ vertical hairpin type connected at ends (with 180° bends) or helical in construction. The radiant coil absorbs heat through radiation. They can be single pass or multi pass depending upon the process-side pressure drop allowed. The radiant coils and bends are housed in the radiant box. Radiant coil materials vary from carbon steel for low temperature services to high alloy steels for high temperature services. These are supported from the radiant side walls or hanging from the radiant roof. Material of these supports is generally high alloy steel. While designing the radiant coil, care is taken so that provision for expansion (in hot conditions) is kept.

=== Burner ===
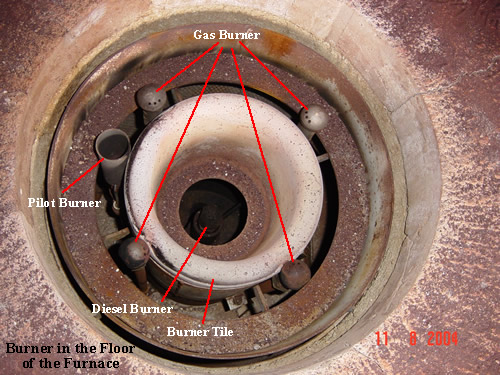
Furnace burner

The burner in the vertical, cylindrical furnace as above, is located in the floor and fires upward. Some furnaces have side fired burners, such as in train locomotives. The burner tile is made of high temperature refractory and is where the flame is contained. Air registers located below the burner and at the outlet of the air blower are devices with movable flaps or vanes that control the shape and pattern of the flame, whether it spreads out or even swirls around. Flames should not spread out too much, as this will cause flame impingement. Air registers can be classified as primary, secondary and if applicable, tertiary, depending on when their air is introduced.

The primary air register is responsible for supplying the primary air to the burner, which is the first to be introduced into the combustion process. This air is essential for the initial ignition and fuel combustion. Secondary air is added after the primary air to supplement the combustion, helping to achieve more complete burning and improve efficiency by ensuring that all the fuel is burned thoroughly. Burners may also include a pre-mixer, which combines the air and fuel before they enter the burner. This mixing is crucial for ensuring a uniform mixture, which enhances combustion efficiency and reduces emissions. Some advanced burners even use steam as a premix to preheat the air and create better mixing of the fuel and heated air. The steam not only aids in mixing but also contributes to maintaining stable flame conditions, especially in high-capacity combustion systems.

In furnace design, the floor is typically made from a different material than the furnace walls. The floor is usually constructed from hard castable refractory material, which is designed to withstand the high temperatures of the furnace while providing durability. This type of refractory material is not only heat-resistant but also allows technicians to safely walk on it during maintenance activities without causing damage to the surface. Furthermore, refractory materials are often chosen for their ability to maintain structural integrity over time, even under the intense thermal cycling and chemical stresses typical in industrial combustion processes.

A furnace can be lit by a small pilot flame or in some older models, by hand. Most pilot flames nowadays are lit by an ignition transformer (much like a car's spark plugs). The pilot flame in turn lights up the main flame. The pilot flame uses natural gas while the main flame can use both diesel and natural gas. When using liquid fuels, an atomizer is used, otherwise, the liquid fuel will simply pour onto the furnace floor and become a hazard. Using a pilot flame for lighting the furnace increases safety and ease compared to using a manual ignition method (like a match).

=== Sootblower ===
Sootblowers are found in the convection section. As this section is above the radiant section and air movement is slower because of the fins, soot tends to accumulate here. Sootblowing is normally done when the efficiency of the convection section is decreased. This can be calculated by looking at the temperature change from the crossover piping and at the convection section exit.

Sootblowers utilize flowing media such as water, air or steam to remove deposits from the tubes. This is typically done during maintenance with the air blower turned on. There are several different types of sootblowers used. Wall blowers of the rotary type are mounted on furnace walls protruding between the convection tubes. The lances are connected to a steam source with holes drilled into it at intervals along its length. When it is turned on, it rotates and blows the soot off the tubes and out through the stack.

=== Stack ===
Stack damper

The flue gas stack is a cylindrical structure at the top of all the heat transfer chambers. The breeching directly below it collects the flue gas and brings it up high into the atmosphere where it will not endanger personnel.

The stack damper contained within works like a butterfly valve and regulates draft (pressure difference between air intake and air exit) in the furnace, which is what pulls the flue gas through the convection section. The stack damper also regulates the heat lost through the stack. As the damper closes, the amount of heat escaping the furnace through the stack decreases, but the pressure or draft in the furnace increases which poses risks to those working around it if there are air leakages in the furnace, the flames can then escape out of the firebox or even explode if the pressure is too great.

=== Insulation ===
Insulation is an important part of the furnace because it improves efficiency by minimizing heat escape from the heated chamber. Refractory materials such as firebrick, castable refractories and ceramic fibre, are used for insulation. The floor of the furnace are normally castable type refractories while those on the walls are nailed or glued in place. Ceramic fibre is commonly used for the roof and wall of the furnace and is graded by its density and then its maximum temperature rating. For example, 8# 2,300 °F means 8 lb/ft^{3} density with a maximum temperature rating of 2,300 °F. The actual service temperature rating for ceramic fiber is a bit lower than the maximum rated temperature. (i.e. 2300 °F is only good to 2145 °F before permanent linear shrinkage).

=== Foundations ===
Concrete pillars are foundation on which the heater is mounted. They can be four nos. for smaller heaters and may be up to 24 nos. for large size heaters. Design of pillars and entire foundation is done based on the load bearing capacity of soil and seismic conditions prevailing in the area. Foundation bolts are grouted in foundation after installation of the heater.

=== Access doors ===
The heater body is provided with access doors at various locations. Access doors are to be used only during shutdown of heater. The normal size of the access door is 600x400 mm, which is sufficient for movement of people/ material into and out of the heater. During operation the access doors are properly bolted using leak proof high temperature gaskets.

== See also ==
- Electric arc furnace
- Fire test furnaces
- Flued boiler
- Industrial oven
- European Conference on Industrial Furnaces and Boilers
- International Flame Research Foundation
