= Electric boiler =

Device that boils water with electricity

An electric boiler is a device that uses electrical energy to boil water instead of fossil fuels used in traditional gas or oil boilers.

== Types ==
There are different types of electric boilers. These three classifications are: classic, ionic, or induction. These classifications are determined based on the boiler's power output, energy performance, model type, energy consumption, and energy efficiency.

In a residential setting, an electric boiler is often used as a backup to a house's heating system. During the colder months, heating and hot water is used more frequently. This type of boiler will provide additional heating and hot water to a home.

Electric and hybrid steam boilers are often used in industries where sustainability, energy efficiency and safety play a major role, such as the food, pharmaceutical and chemical industries. An electric steam boiler has no emissions and allows for CO2-neutral steam production.

Some types of boilers aren't used for heating, but for other purposes. A boiler could be used as a household appliance or to produce steam for an industry.

An electric steam boiler is intended to produce steam for process industry or other uses, such as drying, heat treating, and others. These are generally permanently installed systems with connections to a water supply and piping to transport product steam to the point of use. In places where electric power is relatively low cost compared to fossil fuels, it may be economically practical to use an electric boiler for steam central heating. For example, in Winnipeg, Canada, during the Second World War, large central electric steam boilers were used for a district heating system, using surplus hydroelectric power. The intent was to conserve coal fuel for more critical wartime needs.

Electric boilers may rely on immersion heater resistance heating elements to heat water, or may use electric current passing directly through the water as an electrode boiler.

== Parts ==
A boiler will have five key parts: a burner, combustion chamber, heat exchanger, exhaust stack, and controls. A burner gives off heat that is necessary to heat up the water. A combustion chamber holds the burners and is in charge of the combustion process. A heat exchanger brings the heat from the burner to the water. Its job is to bring heat to the water without having contact with the water, similar to boiling water in a pot. An exhaust stack takes the hot gases and transfers them away from the boiler. Boiler controls are there to make sure the hot water or steam is produced in a safe way.

In addition to these five key parts, a boiler also has a firebox, refractory, and return lines. A firebox contains the flame, created from the fuel and air. A refractory or refractory materials, is used to make sure the fire stays contained by closing any gaps in the firebox. Return lines are used when the water is cooled down. When the water is cooled, the return lines bring the water back to reheat.

== Control and safety ==
Even the tabletop appliance will have a control switch or at least an over temperature cut out to prevent fire if the appliance is started with no water in it. Larger installations have more elaborate controls to ensure that sufficient water supply is available to prevent burn out of the heating elements. These may include interlocks, pressure switches or other measures.

A boiler is a pressure vessel and industrial boilers are constructed, operated and inspected in accordance with local regulations to reduce the risk of explosion. For example, permanently installed pressure relief valves will operate if a control malfunction results in excessive pressure in the boiler.

Normally resistance heating elements are insulated from the water going through the boiler; sensitive ground fault leakage current detection may be installed to alarm or shut off power if an insulation failure is detected. Electrode boilers put the water supply in direct contact with the electrical supply; current collectors or other features may be provided in piping to prevent dangerous electrical hazards on connected piping.

== Advantages ==
Electric and hybrid steam boilers offer several advantages, including higher reliability, flexibility and safety. They are easier to install and require less space than traditional steam boilers, which is especially useful for smaller spaces. In addition, they are quieter to operate and produce less vibration and noise. Finally, electric and hybrid steam boilers are fully automatic and have advanced control and monitoring systems that ensure optimal operation and safety.

== Application issues ==
Any dissolved minerals in the water will be concentrated by the evaporation and will tend to form a scale coating heating surfaces. Even potable water may contain enough minerals to eventually clog or scale a boiler. Household appliances can be cleaned readily, but permanent boiler installations require control of make-up water supply chemistry to reduce scaling.

Electric heating is generally highly efficient; since there is no stream of waste combustion gases emitting from the boiler, nearly all the purchased energy appears in the product hot water or steam in useful form. This high efficiency even in small sizes partly offsets the generally higher cost of electric energy compared to fossil fuels. An electric boiler can be placed in operation quickly, as there is no furnace to reach high temperatures. Environmental impact is displaced to the source of the grid electricity; however, if fossil fuel is being consumed to make electricity, overall efficiency will be lower than direct use of the fuel.

Operationally, an electric boiler is a convenient process unit that is easy to control and that requires no space for fuel storage nor for an exhaust gas stack. There is no blower for combustion air and only minimal pumps required for operation, so the boiler is quiet.

== See also ==
- Boiler (power generation) boilers fired by fuel used to operate electric generators
