= IFRF =

IFRF is an acronym and may refer to:

- ISKCON Food Relief Foundation
- International Flame Research Foundation
