= Hot water reset =

Energy-saving control algorithm for heating boilers

Hot water reset, also called outdoor reset (ODR) is an energy-saving automatic control algorithm for heating boilers that adjusts the temperature of the hot water supplied. They are used with boilers typically fired with fuel oil or natural gas. A hot water reset control loop measures the outside air temperature; this information is used to estimate demand or heating load as the outdoor temperature varies. The supply hot water temperature is modulated up and down range in an inverse linear ratio to outside air temperature. The typical range for conventional boilers is to vary the supply water temperature from 60 to 82 °C (140 to 180 °F) as the outside temperature varies from 18 to −18 °C (64 to 0 °F).

Buildings cool down slowly when the outdoor temperature is moderate, and cool more rapidly when the outdoor temperature is colder. Hot water reset reduces the energy output by the heating system to approximately balance it against the energy lost as the building cools. This makes it easier to maintain the temperature within the desired range (as the radiant heating systems that boilers usually power respond slowly and are subject to overshoot) and can allow boilers to operate more efficiently.

== Implementation ==
The control system can be made to modulate the supply water temperature in two different ways:

1. By acting as an operating control on the boiler burners, either modulated on/off, high/low fire, or fully modulating fire, depending on the burner construction. When modulating the actual boiler temperature lower, water temperature needs to have a low limit and be maintained above the flue gas condensation temperature for non-condensing boilers, typically above 60 °C (140 °F). Condensing boilers can be made to operate at temperatures below the flue gas condensation limit, typically below 55 °C (131 °F) and raise stated efficiencies from 70-80% to around 90-95%.
2. By acting as an operating control on a three-way powered mixing valve or proportional injection pump system that modulates the supply distribution hot water temperature. The mixing valve or mixing pump system recirculates the return water temperature and adds proportionally supply hot water from the boiler for tempering to achieve the desired supply water temperature. Another method is to adjust boiler temperature from thermostat activity. This is indoor reset control. It is more responsive to real needs inside the building.
