= Sursee-Triengen Railway =

Railway company in Switzerland

- Native name: Sursee-Triengen-Bahn
- Founded: 1911; 114 years ago
- Headquarters: Triengen, Switzerland
- Website: sursee-triengen-bahn.ch

The Sursee-Triengen Railway (German: Sursee-Triengen-Bahn) (ST) is a railway company in Switzerland. It owns a railway line of only 8.9 km between Sursee, where it connects to the SBB-CFF-FFS network, and Triengen. The line was opened on 23 November 1912 with steam traction. Unlike most other railways in Switzerland, it was never electrified but a small diesel locomotive was purchased in 1965.

The company also owns the Hinwil to Bäretswil section of the Uerikon–Bauma railway and leases the section from Bäretswil to Bauma. This line hosts limited freight services plus excursion trains of the Dampfbahn-Verein Zürcher Oberland.

== Sursee–Triengen line ==
Sursee–Triengen line
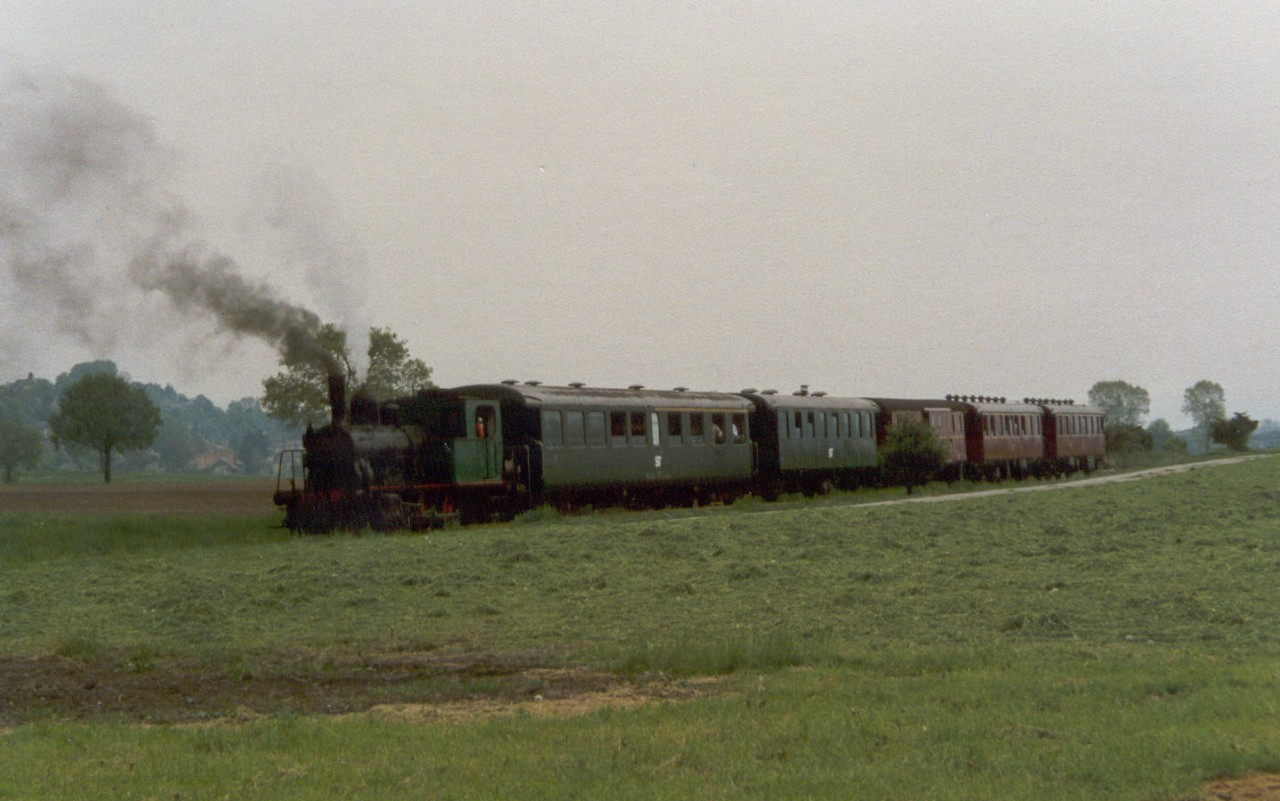
- Steam train between Sursee and Triengen, 7 May 1988

Overview
- Owner: Sursee-Triengen Railway

History
- Opened: 23 November 1912

Technical
- Line length: 8.9 km (5.53 mi)
- Number of tracks: Single track with passing loops
- Track gauge: 1,435 mm (4 ft 8 1/2 in) standard gauge
- Minimum radius: 250 m (820 ft)
- Maximum incline: 15 ‰ or 1.5 %

=== Steam locomotives ===
Traffic had started with two small steam locomotives E 2/2 1 and 2 and in 1917 a steam motor coach joined them. This unique FZm 1/2 11 had mail and baggage compartments. 1961-1963 these three vehicles reached the end of their lives and were replaced by used SBB E 3/3 "Tigerli". The first two of them (3 ex 8477 and 4 ex 8488) had soon to be replaced by two others (5 ex 8479 and 8522). 1960-64 a leased tramway-type ("Glaskasten") Ed 2/2 from VHB was in use. E 3/3 5 and 8522 were kept as replacements for the new diesel.

=== Sursee-Stadt Station ===
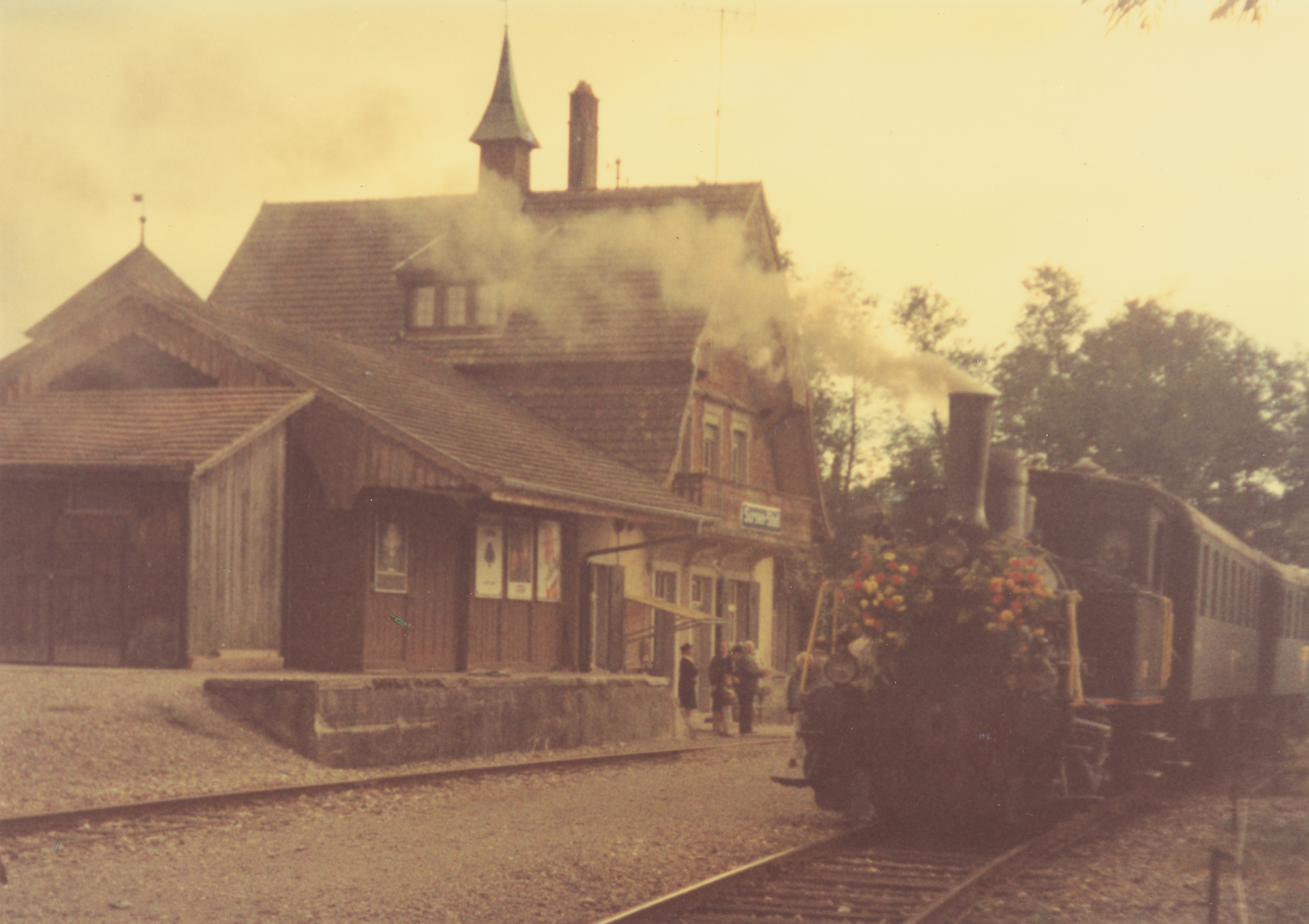
Station ca. 1970

When the line was opened in 1912, SB built a passenger Station North of the Old town Center, called Sursee-Stadt. The Station was connected to the SBB Olten-Lucerne Railway over a wide curve through the Kleinfeld into the northern End of Sursee SBB where the Trains from Triengen terminated. The Station Sursee-Stadt was served until the construction of the N2 to Lucerne in 1978. The motorway connection Sursee called for the construction of a Northern Ringroad Ringstrasse Nord through the Bifang. At this point the Tracks were ripped up and relocated to an even wider curve bypassing the now Built up Kleinfeld and joining the existing Tracks in the Schwyzermatt. The Industriestrasse still follows a part of the exact curve, where the old Tracks used to lay between Sursee-SBB and Sursee-Stadt. On the Triengen Side of the Station, all remnants of the old Tracks have been removed. The Track used to lay where the Suhrentalstrasse to Geuensee now stands. The Station Building was preserved and now functions as a Restaurant called Bahnhöfli.

=== Planned extension ===
There had been many plans and long discussions about a through going Suhre valley railway. This would have been the existing, 10.18 kilometres (6.33 mi) long 1,000 mm (3 ft 3 3/8 in) metre gauge Aarau–Schöftland line of the Wynental and Suhrental railway (WSB), a new meter gauge line Schöftland–Triengen and a third rail in the track of the Sursee–Triengen railway, including electrification. Electric meter gauge trains would have made the journey from Aarau to Sursee. Freight traffic could have continued on standard gauge to Triengen, similar to Wohlen–Bremgarten of the BDWM. But it wasn't the time to build new secondary railways then and furthermore Triengen and Schöftland are situated in different cantons. On 25 September 1971 regular passenger traffic of the ST ended and a new bus service Sursee–Triengen–Schöftland connected with the modernized WSB line.

=== Current operation ===
Freight traffic continued and in 1976 a second diesel of SBB Tm IV type arrived. When the nostalgia-boom reached Switzerland, ST gave its steam 8522 engine to the Dampfbahn Bern which gave it an overhaul and used it for some time. Having kept the old passenger coaches, ST began to offer steam train runs. Remarkable thing is that 8522 is one of the two locomotives that were "partly electrified" during World War 2. An electric boiler heating was fitted to save on coal, but when the war was over and supply restarted, pantograph and electric heater were removed.

After the 1999 reform of railway law, SBB Cargo decided to bring freight cars to their destinations in open access. It took over Tm IV 2 from ST. So, the ST of today is an infrastructure and steam train company.

=== Future ===
A study about the feasibility of reinstating passenger traffic and a possible extension to Schöftland commissioned by the Sursee-Triengen company with ETH Zurich was published in May 2009. The municipality Triengen opposes passenger rail traffic, as access to settlements seems to be better by road transport. Furthermore, the municipality would have to cover part of the potential higher deficit.

== Uerikon–Bauma line ==
The Uerikon–Bauma railway is a railway line in the Canton of Zürich. The section from Uerikon to Hinwil closed in 1948; the remaining 11.2 kilometres (7.0 mi) passed to Swiss Federal Railways (SBB) and later, in part, the Dampfbahn-Verein Zürcher Oberland (DVZO) heritage railway. The Sursee-Triengen-Bahn acquired the Hinwil to Bäretswil section of the line from the SBB in 2018, and then leased the Bäretswil to Bauma section from the DVZO in 2019, giving it complete control of the line.
