= Pressuretrol =

A pressuretrol is a control used to control a steam boiler, by setting when the boiler should begin and end firing based on steam pressure. The pressuretrol is generally secondary to another control, such as a thermostat(generally in smaller buildings) or outdoor-reset controller- If this controller is not calling for heat, the pressuretrol will not activate the boiler.

== Settings ==
Pressuretrols have 2 settings: A main cut-in or cut-out setting (depending on model), and a differential setting (which is either additive or subtractive, and usually stated on the controller). The main setting is accessible from the outside of the controller, but the differential is often located inside the controller box, and typically the cover must be removed by removing a screw to access the differential control. If the main setting is a cut-in setting, then the differential setting sets the cut-out setpoint by adding to the cut-in setting(additive), and if the main setting is a cut-out setting, then the differential sets the cut-in by subtracting from the cut-out setting (subtractive).

== Domestic hot water ==
Note that in systems in which the boiler provides domestic hot water as well as steam, the pressuretrol does not control the DHW temperature. This is controlled by an aquastat which can control the boiler independently of the pressuretrol to meet DHW demand.
