= SBB E 3/3 =

Swiss steam shunting locomotive

SBB-CFF-FFS E 3/3
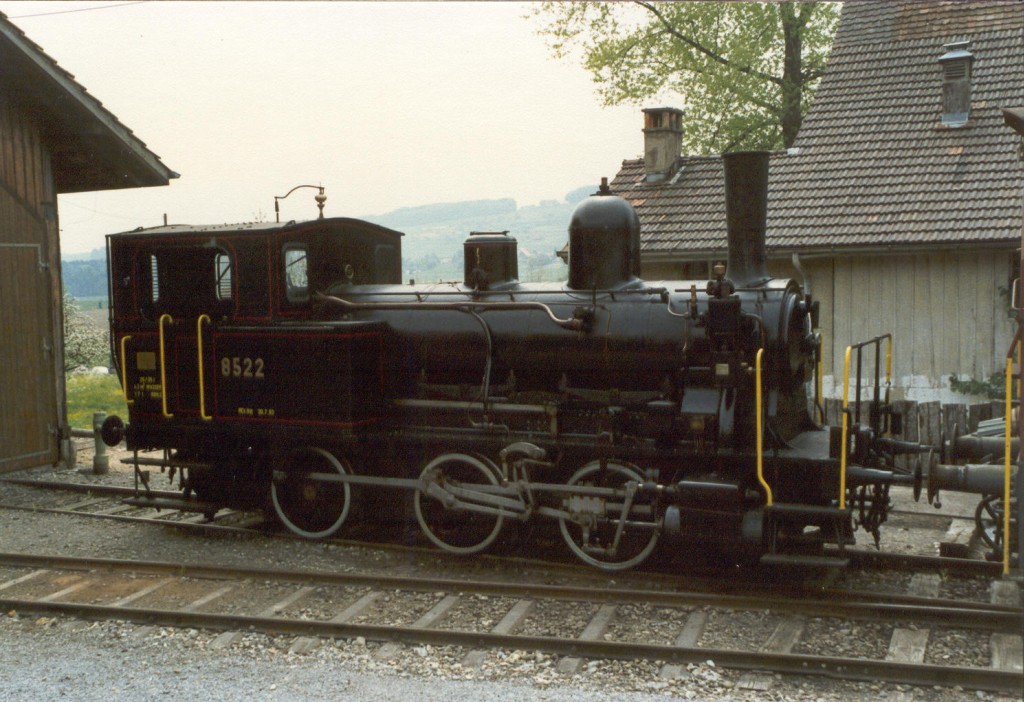
- E 3/3 No.8522 on the Sursee-Triengen Railway
Type and origin
- Power type: Steam
- Builder: Swiss Locomotive and Machine Works
- Build date: 1896–1915
- Total produced: 118
Specifications
- Configuration
  - Whyte: 0-6-0T
  - UIC: C n2t
- Gauge: 1,435 mm (4 ft 8 1/2 in) standard gauge
- Coupled dia.: 1,040 mm (3 ft 5 in)
- Empty weight: 25–26.2 t (24.6–25.8 long tons; 27.6–28.9 short tons)
- Service weight: 32.7–34.9 t (32.2–34.3 long tons; 36.0–38.5 short tons)
- Firebox
  - Grate area: 1.2 m^{2} (13 sq ft)
- Cylinders: Two, outside
- Cylinder size: 360 mm × 500 mm 14.17 in × 19.69 in
- Valve gear: Walschaerts
Performance figures
- Maximum speed: 45–50 km/h (28–31 mph)
- Indicated power: 368 kW (493 hp)
Career
- Operators: Swiss Federal Railways
- Numbers: 8401-8425; 8431-8440; 8451-8533
- Nicknames: Tigerli (Tiger)
- Withdrawn: 1960s
- Disposition: 26 preserved, remainder scrapped

The E 3/3 is a classification used by the Swiss Federal Railways for 0-6-0T shunting locomotives. They were originally delivered to the Swiss Central Railway and the Jura-Simplon Railway, before being absorbed into SBB in 1902, who ordered 83 more locomotives of similar design.

== Background ==
In 1902, the SBB inherited a total of 66 shunting steam locomotives of the E 3/3 type from its predecessor railways. Of these, three were from the United Swiss Railways (Nos. 8395–8397), 36 from the Swiss Central Railway (Nos. 8398, 8399, 8401–8425, 8581–8589 ), 16 from the Jura-Simplon Railway (Nos. 8431–8440, 8571–8576) and 11 from the Swiss Northeastern Railway (Nos. 8551–8559, 8661, 8662).

Preserved pre-SBB E 3/3 locomotives

Railway	Pre-SBB number	Built	SBB number	Location	Current number	TSI number	Status
SCB	F3 41	1901	8410	Oensingen-Balsthal-Bahn (OeBB)	SCB 41	90 85 000 8 410-2	Tigerli; operational
NOB	F3 253	1894	8551	Private property	8551	90 85 000 8 551-3	Static display
NOB	F3 256	1894	8554	Verein Historische Seethalbahn	456	90 85 000 8 554-7	Operational
JS	F3 853	1890	8573	Verein Dampfbahn Bern (VDBB)	JS 853	90 85 000 8 573-7	Operational
JS	F3 855	1890	8575	Kerzers-Kallnach Railway Museum			Static display

== History ==
The fleet of E 3/3s inherited from the SBB's predecessors were not sufficient at their task, meaning that the SBB had to procure additional locomotives in order to gradually equip all railway stations, larger stations and connecting facilities with a powerful shunting locomotive. Previously, former mainline locomotives had been used for this purpose, but they were not nearly as maneuverable.

Owing to coal shortage during the Second World War, in 1942/1943, locomotives No.8521 and 8522 were equipped with an electric boiler heating system fed from the overhead line and pantographs on the driver's cab. The electrical equipment was sourced from Brown, Boveri & Cie. and the SBB workshop in Yverdon installed the equipment on No.8521 on 13 January 1943, and on No.8522 on 11 February 1943. Both locomotives had their electrical heaters removed in July 1951 and 24 April 1953 respectively. The latter has survived into preservation, and is operational on the Sursee-Triengen Railway.

Preserved SBB E 3/3 locomotives

Number	Built	Location	Current number	TSI number	Status
8463	1904	Club del San Gottardo (CSG)	8463	90 85 000 8 463-1	Operational
8474	1907	Locorama Romanshorn	8474		Inactive
8476	1907	Dampfbahn-Verein Zürcher Oberland (DVZO)	10	90 85 000 8 476-3	Chemie-Tiger, under overhaul
8479	1907	Sursee-Triengen-Bahn (ST)	5	90 85 000 8 479-7	Operational
8481	1907	Feldschlösschen Brewery	8481		Plinthed
8483	1907	Oensingen-Balsthal-Bahn (OeBB)	7		Inactive
8485	1907	Historische Eisenbahn Gesellschaft (see Delémont Roundhouse)	8485		Operational
8487	1909	Buchs SG railway station (SBB Historic)	8487		Plinthed
8492	1909	Verein Dampfgruppe Zürich (VDZ)	6	90 85 000 8 492-0	Perlen-Tigerli, operational
8494	1909	Compagnie de Train à Vapeur de la Vallée de Joux (CTVJ)	8494	90 85 000 8 494-6	Operational
8500	1910	OeBB	6		Inactive
8501	1910	CSG	8501	90 85 000 8 501-8	Operational
8507	1910	Chemin de Fer Touristique Pontarlier-Vallorbe (France)	8507		Inactive
8511	1911	Vapeur Val-de-Travers (see Régional du Val-de-Travers)	8511	90 85 000 8 511-7	Operational
8512	1911	Verein Dampfgruppe Zürich (VDZ) (SBB Historic)	8512		Operational
8516	1911	Private property	8516		Inactive
8518	1913	DVZO	8518 Bäretswil	90 85 000 8 518-2	Operational
8522	1913	ST	8522	90 85 000 8 522-4	Operational
8523	1915	CTVJ	8523	90 85 000 8 523-2	Under overhaul
8527	1915	Private property	8527		Inactive
8532	1915	Kander Valley Railway (Germany)	8532		Inactive

== See also ==
- Electric–steam locomotive
- List of stock used by Swiss Federal Railways
