= European Conference on Industrial Furnaces and Boilers =

Series of conferences since 1988

The European Conference on Industrial Furnaces and Boilers (INFUB) is a series of conferences organised since 1988. It is organised by Cenertec. The aim of the conference is to disseminate information on research and development activities in the field of furnace and boiler technology and related areas, such as process and combustion control, optimising the efficiency of high-temperature energy applications and reducing pollutant emissions.

== List of INFUB conferences ==
15 INFUB conferences have been organised since 1988 in Portugal.

Year	Number	Location	Ref.
1988	INFUB-1	Lisbon	
1991	INFUB-2	Vilamoura	
1995	INFUB-3	Lisbon	
1997	INFUB-4	Porto	
2000	INFUB-5	Porto	
2002	INFUB-6	Lisbon	
2006	INFUB-7	Porto	
2008	INFUB-8	Vilamoura	
2011	INFUB-9	Estoril	
2015	INFUB-10	Porto	
2017	INFUB-11	Albufeira	
2020	INFUB-12	Online	
2022	INFUB-13	Albufeira	
2024	INFUB-14	Algarve	
2026	INFUB-15	Porto	

== See also ==
- The International Flame Research Foundation – a network related to industrial combustion, including furnaces and boilers.
- The Combustion Institute – a network of combustion researchers.
