= Electric–steam locomotive =

Steam locomotive with boiler heated electrically

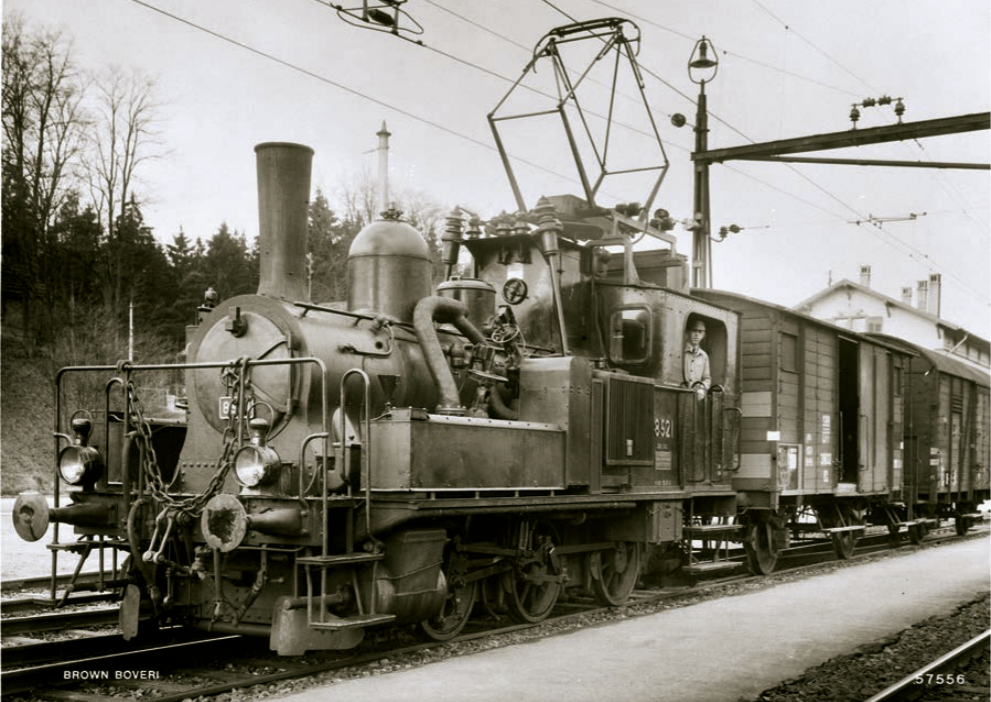
SBB E 3/3 locomotive in electric–steam form

An electric–steam locomotive is a steam locomotive that uses electricity to heat the water in the boiler to create steam instead of burning fuel in a firebox. Lack of time, resources and fuel, and the presence of relatively cheap and available electricity may make conversion of an existing steam locomotive into an electric–steam locomotive a viable proposition.

== Switzerland ==
Switzerland has no natural reserves of coal, but the mountainous region offers hydroelectricity.

By the outbreak of the Second World War, 2,191 km (1,361 mi) of SBB lines (73.6% of the network) had been electrified, whilst the price of imported German coal kept rising. After the Fall of France in 1940, landlocked Switzerland was surrounded on all sides by Germany, its allies and countries occupied by Germany. In an attempt to save on coal the Swiss Federal Railways fitted two small 0-6-0 steam shunters of the class E 3/3 with a pantograph. Power was taken from overhead lines (15 kV, 16 2/3 Hz), and fed to heating elements, via two transformers rated together at 480 kW (640 hp).

The modified E 3/3 8521 was brought into use on 13 January 1943; 8522 followed on 11 February 1943. They could run up to 20 minutes without power supply once the boiler had been charged to full pressure, similar to a fireless locomotive. The firebox was retained, usually keeping hot embers, with a classic fire for longer operation on non-electrified tracks. The water circulation pump, the control circuit and the lighting were powered by a battery that was charged from a rectifier fed by one of the transformers.

The system was capable of producing about 300 kg (660 lb) of steam per hour at 12 atm (176.4 psi) pressure. It weighed about 7 t (6.9 long tons; 7.7 short tons), increasing the weight of the locomotive from 35 t (34 long tons; 39 short tons) to 42 t (41 long tons; 46 short tons), and allowed a saving of 700–1,200 kg (1,500–2,600 lb) of coal per working day. Bringing the locomotive to pressure took about one hour.

The electric heaters were removed in 1951 from locomotive 8521 and in 1953 from 8522. As of 2013, locomotive E 3/3 8522 was still in (museum) service on the Sursee–Triengen railway as an ordinary steam engine with no electric heating.

== Canada ==
A Canadian patent for an electric–steam locomotive was granted as recently as 1992. The drawing shows a Crampton type 8-4-0 but its intended use is unknown.

== Electric pre-heater ==
A conventional coal-fired or oil-fired steam locomotive may be prepared for service by using an external electric pre-heater. This allows steam to be raised gradually during the night so that the locomotive will be ready for use in the morning.

Modern steam locomotives, such as the rack locomotives of Brienz–Rothorn railway and DLM's modernised class 52.80 locomotive, are fitted with internal electric heaters. This allows keeping the well insulated boiler warm overnight or even to start heating automatically in the early morning.

== Models ==
The electric–steam system is also used in some small-scale model steam locomotives.

In September 2003 Hornby Railways released its first steam-powered 00 gauge locomotive, a scale model locomotive where the boiler is heated by electric power collected from the running rails. However, mistakes in the instruction manual and video led to operator error and thus poor publicity for the models. Furthermore, the need to boil the water meant that these engines came with a dedicated power supply/controller to provide more voltage and current.

== Literature ==
- Alfred Moser: Der Dampfbetrieb der schweizerischen Eisenbahnen 1847–1966. 4. nachgeführte Auflage. Birkhäuser, Stuttgart 1967, S. 269. (detailed description in German)

== See also ==
- Electric locomotive
- Electric steam boiler
- Heilmann locomotive
- List of steam technology patents
- Steam turbine electric locomotive

== Additional reading ==
- Carver, Rex (August 2009). "The Electro–steam story: Kettles on wheels!". The Railway Magazine. 155 (1300): 38–39. ISSN 0033-8923.
- "The Swiss Electric–Steam Locomotives". Loco locos. 7 Jan 2010. Archived from the original on 18 October 2010.
