= Natural circulation boiler =

In a natural circulation boiler the circulation occurs without mechanical pumping and is driven by the hydrostatic pressure difference resulting from density variations between the heated riser tubes and the cooler downcomer tubes. When the boiler is heated, density differences in the evaporator tubes generates continuous convection currents that sustains circulation (thermosiphon effect) through the closed loop formed by the risers, steam drum, and downcomers.

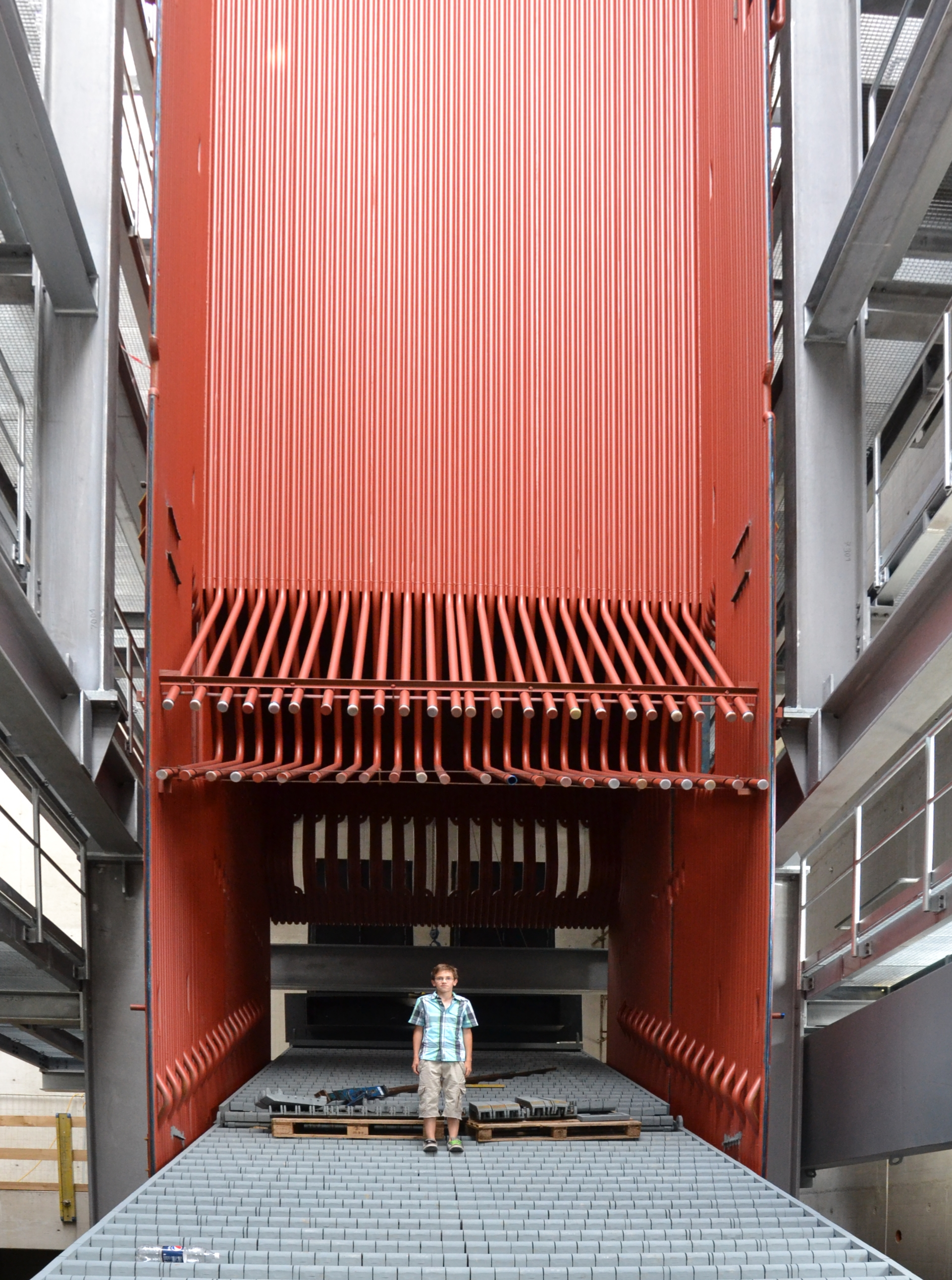
Natural Circulation Boiler in construction

== See also ==
- Controlled circulation
- Forced circulation boiler
- Once through steam generator
