= Boiler =

Closed vessel in which fluid is heated

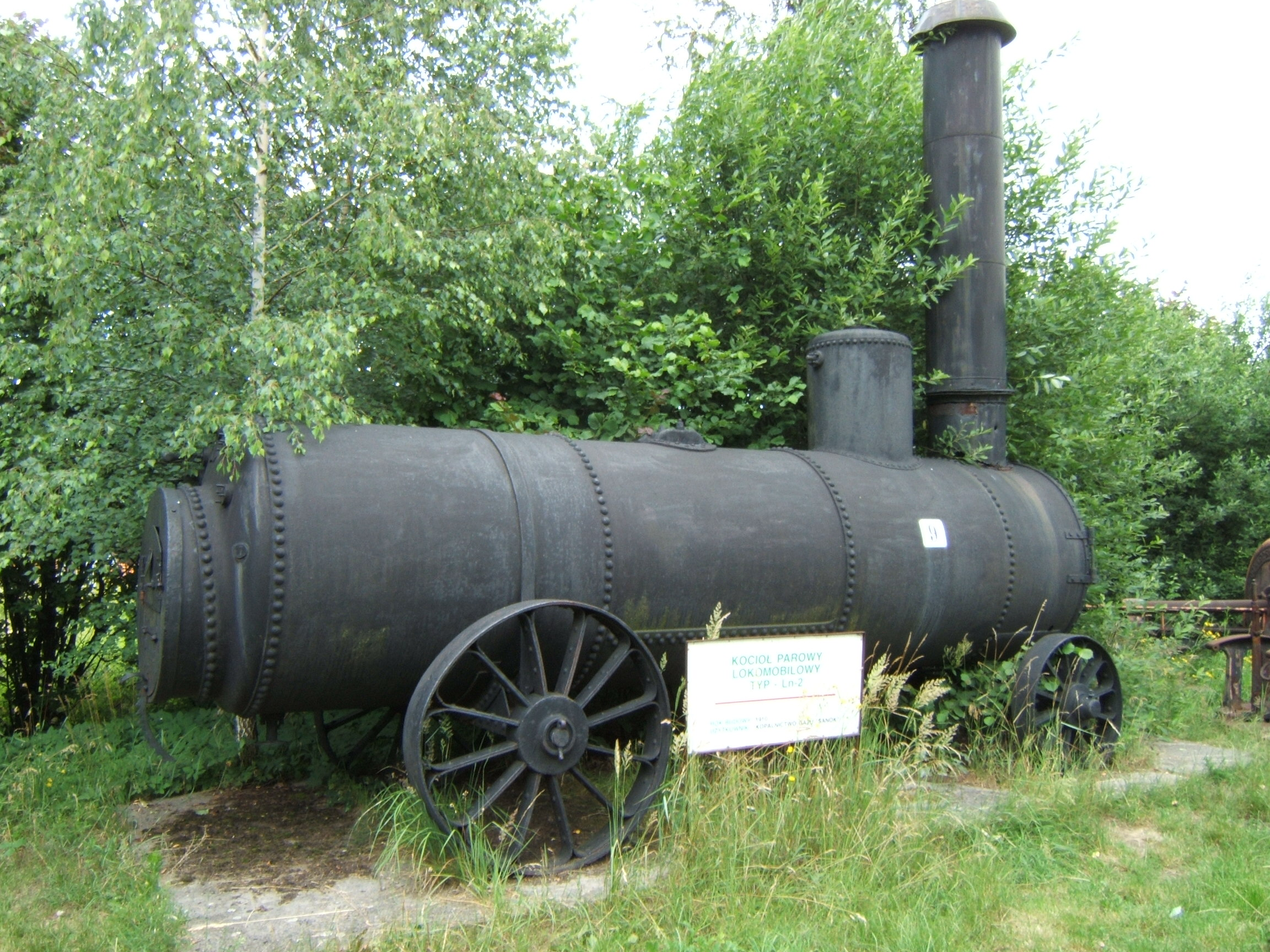
A moveable (mobile) boiler (preserved, Historic Silver Mine in Tarnowskie Góry, Poland)

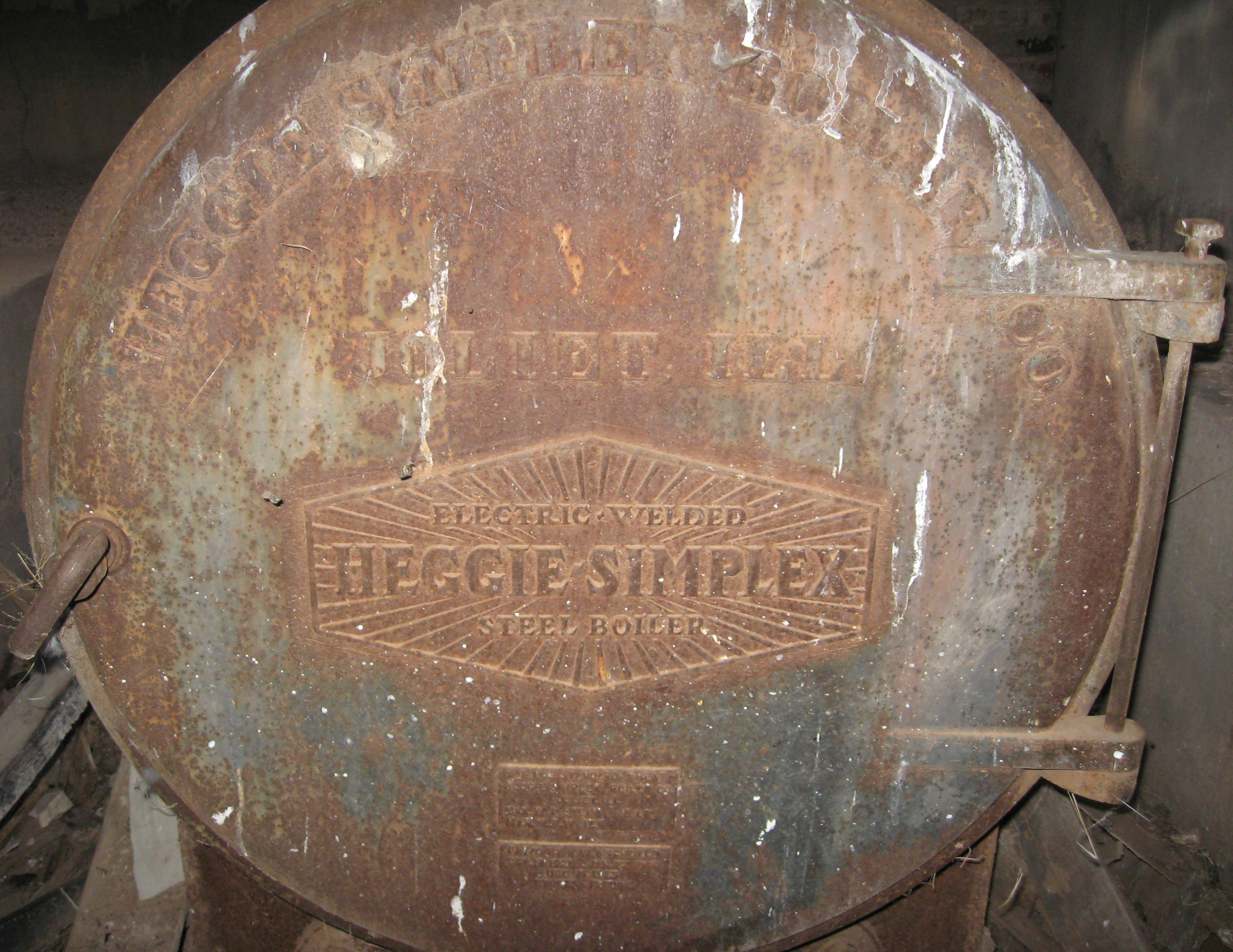
A stationary boiler (United States)

A boiler is a closed vessel in which fluid (generally water) is heated. The fluid does not necessarily boil. The heated or vaporized fluid exits the boiler for use in various processes or heating applications, including water heating, central heating, boiler-based power generation, cooking, and sanitation.

== Heat sources ==
In a fossil fuel power plant using a steam cycle for power generation, the primary heat source will be combustion of coal, oil, or natural gas. In some cases byproduct fuel such as the carbon monoxide rich offgasses of a coke battery can be burned to heat a boiler; biofuels such as bagasse, where economically available, can also be used. In a nuclear power plant, boilers called steam generators are heated by the heat produced by nuclear fission. Where a large volume of hot gas is available from some process, a heat recovery steam generator or recovery boiler can use the heat to produce steam, with little or no extra fuel consumed; such a configuration is common in a combined cycle power plant where a gas turbine and a steam boiler are used. In all cases the combustion product waste gases are separate from the working fluid of the steam cycle, making these systems examples of external combustion engines.

== Materials ==
The pressure vessel of a boiler is usually made of steel (or alloy steel), or historically of wrought iron. Stainless steel, especially of the austenitic types, is not used in wetted parts of boilers due to corrosion and stress corrosion cracking. However, ferritic stainless steel is often used in superheater sections that will not be exposed to boiling water, and electrically heated stainless steel shell boilers are allowed under the European "Pressure Equipment Directive" for production of steam for sterilizers and disinfectors.

In live steam models, copper or brass is often used because it is more easily fabricated in smaller size boilers. Historically, copper was often used for fireboxes (particularly for steam locomotives), because of its better formability and higher thermal conductivity; however, in more recent times, the high price of copper often makes this an uneconomic choice and cheaper substitutes (such as steel) are used instead.

For much of the Victorian "age of steam", the only material used for boilermaking was the highest grade of wrought iron, with assembly by riveting. This iron was often obtained from specialist ironworks, such as those in the Cleator Moor (UK) area, noted for the high quality of their rolled plate, which was especially suitable for use in critical applications such as high-pressure boilers. In the 20th century, design practice moved towards the use of steel, with welded construction, which is stronger and cheaper, and can be fabricated more quickly and with less labour. Wrought iron boilers corrode far more slowly than their modern-day steel counterparts, and are less susceptible to localized pitting and stress-corrosion. That makes the longevity of older wrought-iron boilers far superior to that of welded steel boilers.

Cast iron may be used for the heating vessel of domestic water heaters. Although such heaters are usually termed "boilers" in some countries, their purpose is usually to produce hot water, not steam, and so they run at low pressure and try to avoid boiling. The brittleness of cast iron makes it impractical for high-pressure steam boilers.

== Energy ==
The source of heat for a boiler is combustion of any of several fuels, such as wood, coal, oil, or natural gas. Electric steam boilers use resistance- or immersion-type heating elements. Nuclear fission is also used as a heat source for generating steam, either directly (BWR) or, in most cases, in specialised heat exchangers called "steam generators" (PWR). Heat recovery steam generators (HRSGs) use the heat rejected from other processes such as gas turbine.

== Boiler efficiency ==
There are two methods to measure the boiler efficiency in the ASME performance test code (PTC) for boilers ASME PTC 4 and for HRSG ASME PTC 4.4 and EN 12952-15 for water tube boilers:

1. Input-output method (direct method)
2. Heat-loss method (indirect method)

=== Input-output method (or direct method) ===
Direct method of boiler efficiency test is more usable or more common.

Boiler efficiency = power out / power in = Q × (Hg − Hf) / (q × GCV) × 100%

where

Q, rate of steam flow in kg/h
Hg, enthalpy of saturated steam in kcal/kg
Hf, enthalpy of feed water in kcal/kg
q, rate of fuel use in kg/h
GCV, gross calorific value in kcal/kg (e.g., pet coke 8200 kcal/kg)

=== Heat-loss method (or indirect method) ===
To measure boiler efficiency by indirect method, these parameters are needed:

- Ultimate analysis of fuel (H_{2}, S_{2}, S, C, moisture constraint, ash constraint)
- Percentage of O_{2} or CO_{2} at flue gas
- Flue gas temperature at outlet
- Ambient temperature in °C and humidity of air in kg/kg
- GCV of fuel in kcal/kg
- Ash percentage in combustible fuel
- GCV of ash in kcal/kg

== Configurations ==
Boilers can be classified into the following configurations:

Pot boiler or Haycock boiler/Haystack boiler
A primitive "kettle" where a fire heats a partially filled water container from below. 18th-century Haycock boilers generally produced and stored large volumes of very low-pressure steam, often hardly above that of the atmosphere. These could burn wood or most often, coal. Efficiency was very low.
Flued boiler
With one or two large flues—an early type or forerunner of fire-tube boiler.
Fire-tube boiler

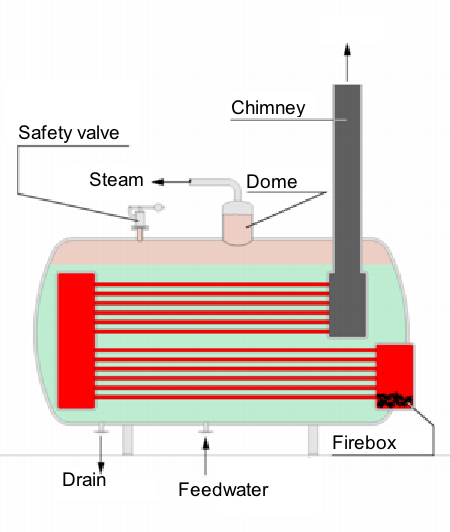
Diagram of a fire-tube boiler

Here, water partially fills a boiler barrel with a small volume left above to accommodate the steam (steam space). This is the type of boiler used in nearly all steam locomotives. The heat source is inside a furnace or firebox that has to be kept permanently surrounded by the water to maintain the temperature of the heating surface below the boiling point. The furnace can be situated at one end of a fire-tube which lengthens the path of the hot gases, thus augmenting the heating surface which can be further increased by making the gases reverse direction through a second parallel tube or a bundle of multiple tubes (two-pass or return flue boiler); alternatively, the gases may be taken along the sides and then beneath the boiler through flues (3-pass boiler). In case of a locomotive-type boiler, a boiler barrel extends from the firebox and the hot gases pass through a bundle of fire tubes inside the barrel which greatly increases the heating surface compared to a single tube and further improves heat transfer. Fire-tube boilers usually have a comparatively low rate of steam production, but high steam storage capacity. Fire-tube boilers mostly burn solid fuels, but are readily adaptable to those of the liquid or gas variety. Fire-tube boilers may also be referred to as "scotch-marine" or "marine" type boilers.
Water-tube boiler

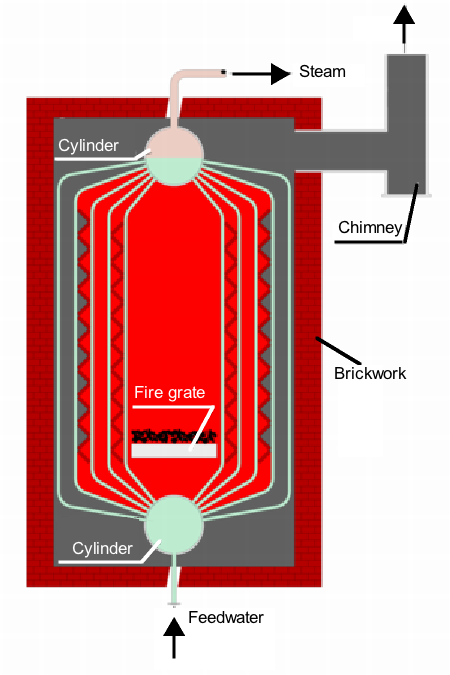
Diagram of a water-tube boiler

In this type, tubes filled with water are arranged inside a furnace in a number of possible configurations. Often the water tubes connect large drums, the lower ones containing water and the upper ones steam and water; in other cases, such as a mono-tube boiler, water is circulated by a pump through a succession of coils. This type generally gives high steam production rates, but less storage capacity than fire-tube boilers. Water tube boilers can be designed to exploit any heat source and are generally preferred in high-pressure applications since the high-pressure water/steam is contained within small diameter pipes which can withstand the pressure with a thinner wall. These boilers are commonly constructed in place, roughly square in shape, and can be multiple stories tall.
Flash boiler
A flash boiler is a specialized type of water-tube boiler in which tubes are close together and water is pumped through them. A flash boiler differs from the type of mono-tube steam generator in which the tube is permanently filled with water. In a flash boiler, the tube is kept so hot that the water feed is quickly flashed into steam and superheated. Flash boilers had some use in automobiles in the 19th century and this use continued into the early 20th century.
Fire-tube boiler with water-tube firebox
Sometimes the two above types have been combined in the following manner: the firebox contains an assembly of water tubes, called thermic siphons. The gases then pass through a conventional firetube boiler. Water-tube fireboxes were installed in many Hungarian locomotives, but have met with little success in other countries.
Sectional boiler
In a cast iron sectional boiler, sometimes called a "pork chop boiler" the water is contained inside cast iron sections. These sections are assembled on site to create the finished boiler.

== Safety ==
To define and secure boilers safely, some professional specialized organizations such as the American Society of Mechanical Engineers (ASME) develop standards and regulation codes. For instance, the ASME Boiler and Pressure Vessel Code is a standard providing a wide range of rules and directives to ensure compliance of the boilers and other pressure vessels with safety, security and design standards.

Historically, boilers were a source of many serious injuries and property destruction due to poorly understood engineering principles. Thin and brittle metal shells can rupture, while poorly welded or riveted seams could open up, leading to a violent eruption of the pressurized steam. When water is converted to steam it expands to over 1,000 times its original volume and travels down steam pipes at over 100 kilometres per hour (62 mph). Because of this, steam is an efficient method of moving energy and heat around a site from a central boiler house to where it is needed, but without the right boiler feedwater treatment, a steam-raising plant will suffer from scale formation and corrosion. At best, this increases energy costs and can lead to poor quality steam, reduced efficiency, shorter plant life and unreliable operation. At worst, it can lead to catastrophic failure and loss of life. Collapsed or dislodged boiler tubes can also spray scalding-hot steam and smoke out of the air intake and firing chute, injuring the firemen who load the coal into the fire chamber. Extremely large boilers providing hundreds of horsepower to operate factories can potentially demolish entire buildings.

A boiler that has a loss of feed water and is permitted to boil dry can be extremely dangerous. If feed water is then sent into the empty boiler, the small cascade of incoming water instantly boils on contact with the superheated metal shell and leads to a violent explosion that cannot be controlled even by safety steam valves. Draining of the boiler can also happen if a leak occurs in the steam supply lines that is larger than the make-up water supply could replace. The Hartford Loop was invented in 1919 by the Hartford Steam Boiler Inspection and Insurance Company as a method to help prevent this condition from occurring, and thereby reduce their insurance claims.

== Superheated steam boiler ==
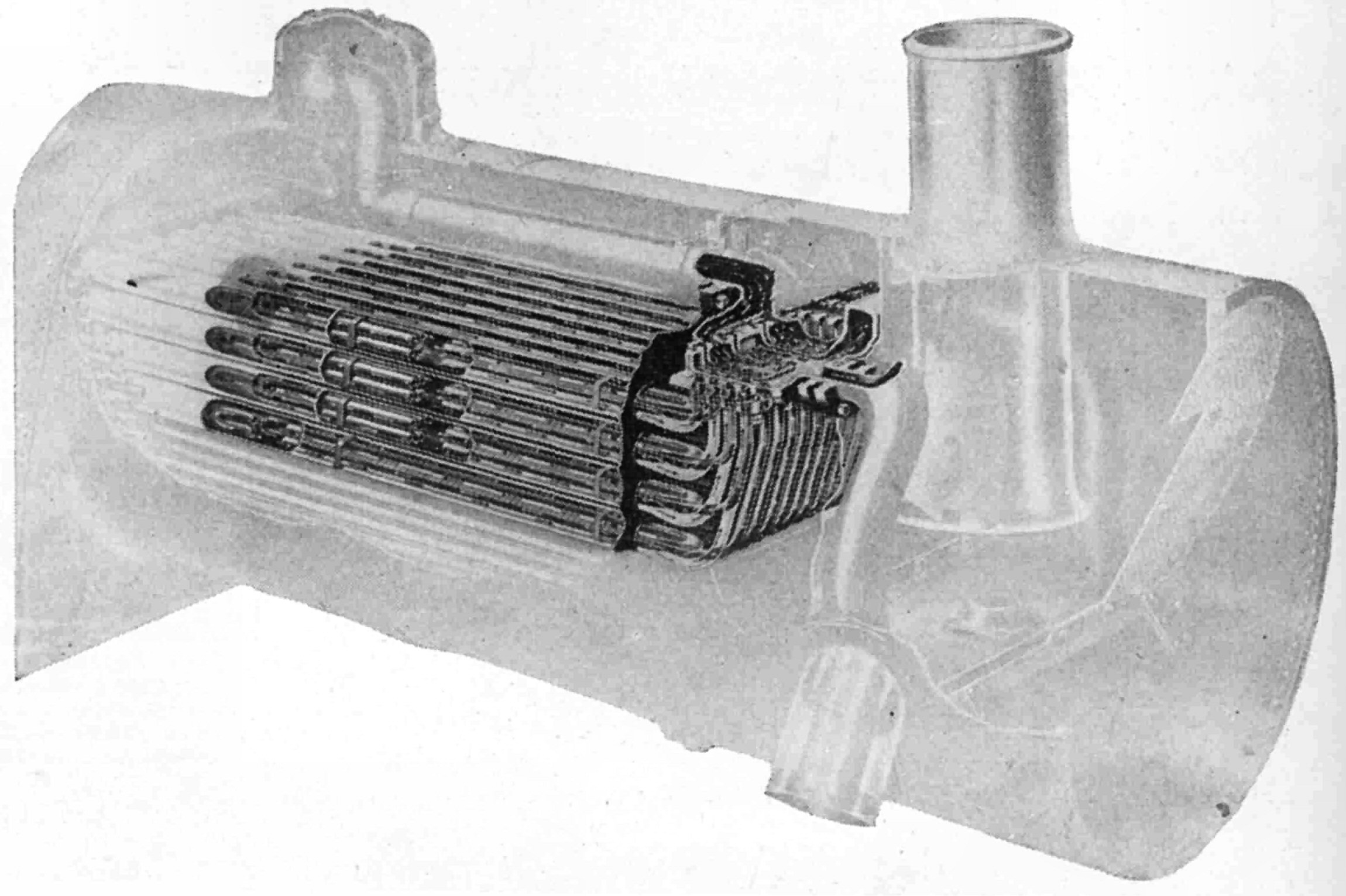
A superheated boiler on a steam locomotive

When water is boiled the result is saturated steam, also referred to as "wet steam." Saturated steam, while mostly consisting of water vapor, carries some unevaporated water in the form of droplets. Saturated steam is useful for many purposes, such as cooking, heating and sanitation, but is not desirable when steam is expected to convey energy to machinery, such as a ship's propulsion system or the "motion" of a steam locomotive. This is because unavoidable temperature and/or pressure loss that occurs as steam travels from the boiler to the machinery will cause some condensation, resulting in liquid water being carried into the machinery. The water entrained in the steam may damage turbine blades or in the case of a reciprocating steam engine, may cause serious mechanical damage due to hydrostatic lock.

Superheated steam boilers evaporate the water and then further heat the steam in a superheater, causing the discharged steam temperature to be substantially above the boiling temperature at the boiler's operating pressure. As the resulting "dry steam" is much hotter than needed to stay in the vaporous state it will not contain any significant unevaporated water. Also, higher steam pressure will be possible than with saturated steam, enabling the steam to carry more energy. Although superheating adds more energy to the steam in the form of heat there is no effect on pressure, which is determined by the rate at which steam is drawn from the boiler and the pressure settings of the safety valves. The fuel consumption required to generate superheated steam is greater than that required to generate an equivalent volume of saturated steam. However, the overall energy efficiency of the steam plant (the combination of boiler, superheater, piping and machinery) generally will be improved enough to more than offset the increased fuel consumption.

Superheater operation is similar to that of the coils on an air conditioning unit, although for a different purpose. The steam piping is directed through the flue gas path in the boiler furnace, an area in which the temperature is typically between 1,300 and 1,600 degrees Celsius (2,372 and 2,912 degrees Fahrenheit). Some superheaters are radiant type, which as the name suggests, they absorb heat by radiation. Others are convection type, absorbing heat from a fluid. Some are a combination of the two types. Through either method, the extreme heat in the flue gas path will also heat the superheater steam piping and the steam within.

The design of any superheated steam plant presents several engineering challenges due to the high working temperatures and pressures. One consideration is the introduction of feedwater to the boiler. The pump used to charge the boiler must be able to overcome the boiler's operating pressure, else water will not flow. As a superheated boiler is usually operated at high pressure, the corresponding feedwater pressure must be even higher, demanding a more robust pump design.

Another consideration is safety. High pressure, superheated steam can be extremely dangerous if it unintentionally escapes. To give the reader some perspective, the steam plants used in many U.S. Navy destroyers built during World War II operated at 600 psi (4,100 kPa; 41 bar) pressure and 850 degrees Fahrenheit (454 degrees Celsius) superheat. In the event of a major rupture of the system, an ever-present hazard in a warship during combat, the enormous energy release of escaping superheated steam, expanding to more than 1600 times its confined volume, would be equivalent to a cataclysmic explosion, whose effects would be exacerbated by the steam release occurring in a confined space, such as a ship's engine room. Also, small leaks that are not visible at the point of leakage could be lethal if an individual were to step into the escaping steam's path. Hence designers endeavor to give the steam-handling components of the system as much strength as possible to maintain integrity. Special methods of coupling steam pipes together are used to prevent leaks, with very high pressure systems employing welded joints to avoid leakage problems with threaded or gasketed connections.

=== Supercritical steam generator ===
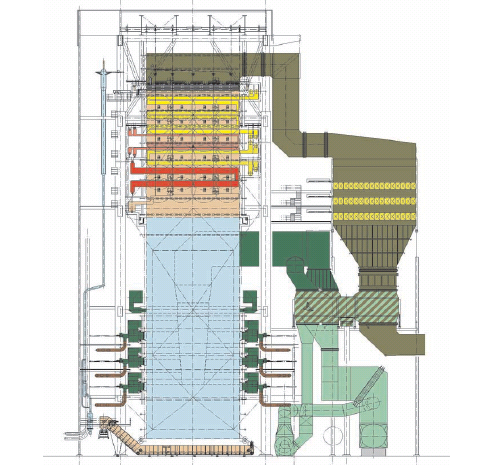
Boiler for a power plant

Supercritical steam generators are frequently used for the production of electric power. They operate at supercritical pressure. In contrast to a "subcritical boiler", a supercritical steam generator operates at such a high pressure (over 3,200 psi or 22 MPa) that the physical turbulence that characterizes boiling ceases to occur; the fluid is neither liquid nor gas but a supercritical fluid. There is no generation of steam bubbles within the water, because the pressure is above the critical pressure point at which steam bubbles can form. As the fluid expands through the turbine stages, its thermodynamic state drops below the critical point as it does work turning the turbine which turns the electrical generator from which power is ultimately extracted. The fluid at that point may be a mix of steam and liquid droplets as it passes into the condenser. This results in slightly less fuel use and therefore less greenhouse gas production. The term "boiler" should not be used for a supercritical pressure steam generator, as no "boiling" occurs in this device.

== Accessories ==
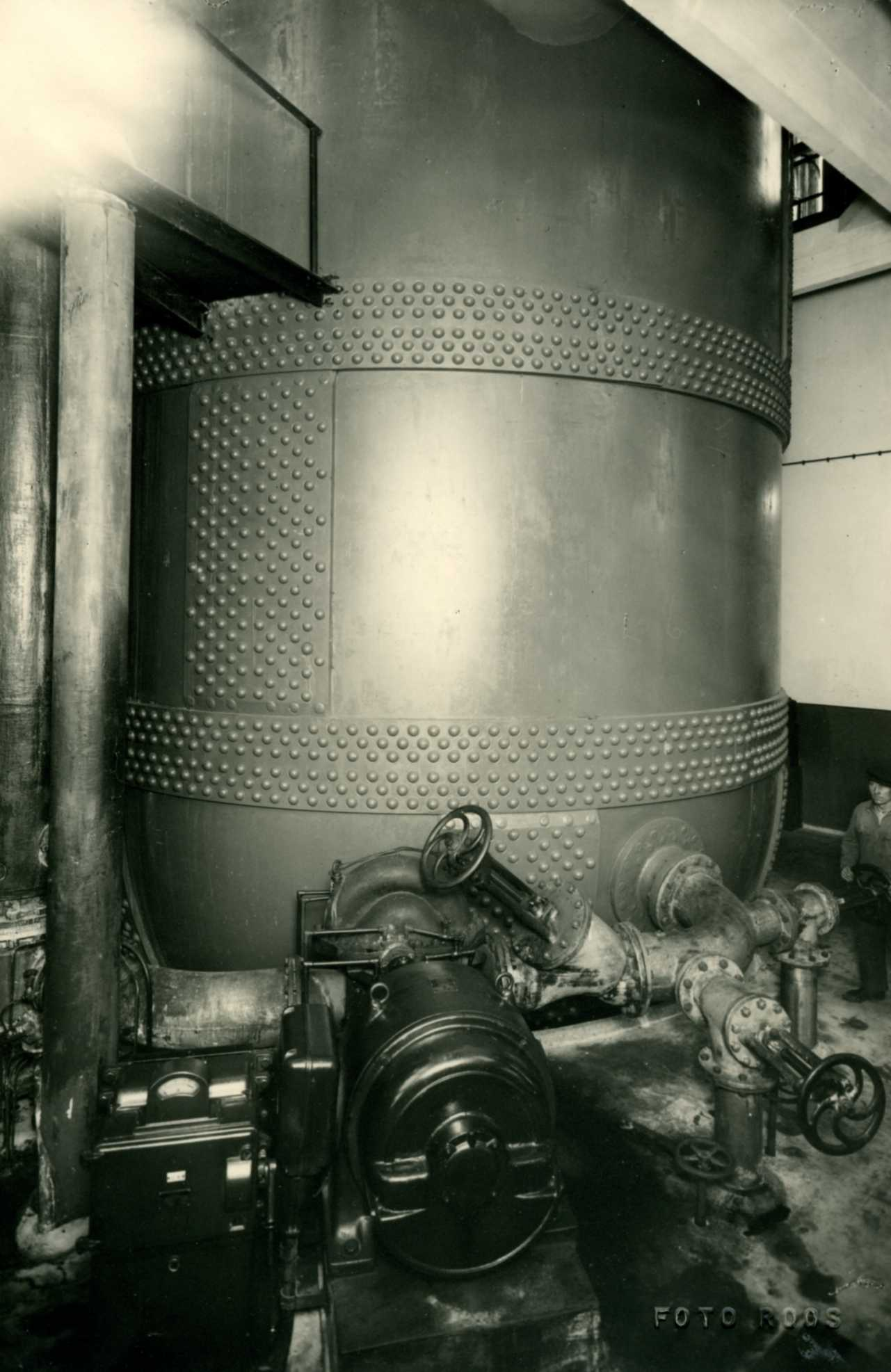
A boiler of Jämsänkoski's pulp mill with calorisator in 1938

=== Boiler fittings and accessories ===
- Pressuretrols to control the steam pressure in the boiler. Boilers generally have 2 or 3 pressuretrols: a manual-reset pressuretrol, which functions as a safety by setting the upper limit of steam pressure; the operating pressuretrol, which controls when the boiler fires to maintain pressure; and for boilers equipped with a modulating burner, a modulating pressuretrol which controls the amount of fire.
- Safety valve: It is used to relieve pressure and prevent possible explosion of a boiler.
- Water level indicators: They show the operator the level of fluid in the boiler, also known as a sight glass, water gauge or water column.
- Bottom blowdown valves: They provide a means for removing solid particulates that condense and lie on the bottom of a boiler. As the name implies, this valve is usually located directly on the bottom of the boiler, and is occasionally opened to use the pressure in the boiler to push these particulates out.
- Continuous blowdown valve: This allows a small quantity of water to escape continuously. Its purpose is to prevent the water in the boiler becoming saturated with dissolved salts. Saturation would lead to foaming and cause water droplets to be carried over with the steam – a condition known as priming. Blowdown is also often used to monitor the chemistry of the boiler water.
- Trycock: a type of valve that is often used to manually check a liquid level in a tank. Most commonly found on a water boiler.
- Flash tank: High-pressure blowdown enters this vessel where the steam can 'flash' safely and be used in a low-pressure system or be vented to atmosphere while the ambient pressure blowdown flows to drain.
- Automatic blowdown/continuous heat recovery system: This system allows the boiler to blowdown only when makeup water is flowing to the boiler, thereby transferring the maximum amount of heat possible from the blowdown to the makeup water. No flash tank is generally needed as the blowdown discharged is close to the temperature of the makeup water.
- Hand holes: They are steel plates installed in openings in "header" to allow for inspections & installation of tubes and inspection of internal surfaces.
- Steam drum internals, a series of screen, scrubber & cans (cyclone separators).
- Low-water cutoff: It is a mechanical means (usually a float switch) or an electrode with a safety switch that is used to turn off the burner or shut off fuel to the boiler to prevent it from running once the water goes below a certain point. If a boiler is "dry-fired" (burned without water in it) it can cause rupture or catastrophic failure.
- Surface blowdown line: It provides a means for removing foam or other lightweight non-condensible substances that tend to float on top of the water inside the boiler.
- Circulating pump: It is designed to circulate water back to the boiler after it has expelled some of its heat.
- Feedwater check valve or clack valve: A non-return stop valve in the feedwater line. This may be fitted to the side of the boiler, just below the water level, or to the top of the boiler.
- Top feed: In this design for feedwater injection, the water is fed to the top of the boiler. This can reduce boiler fatigue caused by thermal stress. By spraying the feedwater over a series of trays the water is quickly heated and this can reduce limescale.
- Desuperheater tubes or bundles: A series of tubes or bundles of tubes in the water drum or the steam drum designed to cool superheated steam, in order to supply auxiliary equipment that does not need, or may be damaged by, dry steam.
- Chemical injection line: A connection to add chemicals for controlling feedwater pH.

=== Steam accessories ===
- Main steam stop valve
- Steam traps
- Main steam stop/check valve: It is used on multiple boiler installations.

=== Combustion accessories ===
- Dutch oven
- Fuel oil system and fuel oil heaters
- Gas system
- Coal system

=== Other essential items ===
- Pressure gauges
- Feed pumps
- Fusible plug
- Insulation and lagging
- Inspectors test pressure gauge attachment
- Name plate
- Registration plate

== Draught ==
A fuel-heated boiler must provide air to oxidize its fuel. Early boilers provided this stream of air, or draught, through the natural action of convection in a chimney connected to the exhaust of the combustion chamber. Since the heated flue gas is less dense than the ambient air surrounding the boiler, the flue gas rises in the chimney, pulling denser, fresh air into the combustion chamber.

Most modern boilers depend on mechanical draught rather than natural draught. This is because natural draught is subject to outside air conditions and temperature of flue gases leaving the furnace, as well as the chimney height. All these factors make proper draught hard to attain and therefore make mechanical draught equipment much more reliable and economical.

Types of draught can also be divided into induced draught, where exhaust gases are pulled out of the boiler; forced draught, where fresh air is pushed into the boiler; and balanced draught, where both effects are employed. Natural draught through the use of a chimney is a type of induced draught; mechanical draught can be induced, forced or balanced.

There are two types of mechanical induced draught. The first is through use of a steam jet. The steam jet oriented in the direction of flue gas flow induces flue gases into the stack and allows for a greater flue gas velocity increasing the overall draught in the furnace. This method was common on steam driven locomotives which could not have tall chimneys. The second method is by simply using an induced draught fan (ID fan) which removes flue gases from the furnace and forces the exhaust gas up the stack. Almost all induced draught furnaces operate with a slightly negative pressure.

Mechanical forced draught is provided by means of a fan forcing air into the combustion chamber. Air is often passed through an air heater; which, as the name suggests, heats the air going into the furnace to increase the overall efficiency of the boiler. Dampers are used to control the quantity of air admitted to the furnace. Forced draught furnaces usually have a positive pressure.

Balanced draught is obtained through use of both induced and forced draught. This is more common with larger boilers where the flue gases have to travel a long distance through many boiler passes. The induced draught fan works in conjunction with the forced draught fan allowing the furnace pressure to be maintained slightly below atmospheric.

== See also ==
- Babcock & Wilcox – American power technology company, boiler manufacturer
- Combustion Engineering – American-based multinational company, boiler manufacturer
- Boiler feed water deaerator – Device that removes dissolved gases from liquids
- Dealkalization of water – Removal of alkalinity ions from water
- Electric water boiler – Consumer electronics appliance (for drinking water)
- Electrode boiler – Type of steam boiler
- European Conference on Industrial Furnaces and Boilers – Series of conferences since 1988 on furnaces and boilers
- Flued boiler – Type of boiler used to make steam
- Heat pump – System that transfers heat from one space to another
- Heating plant – Infrastructure for generating thermal energy for use in district heating
- Hot water reset – Energy-saving control algorithm for heating boilers
- Internally rifled boiler tubes – Tubes used to evaporate water inside thermal power plant boilers (also known as Serve tubes)
- International Flame Research Foundation – Network of industrial flame experts
- Jetstream furnace – Type of wood-fired water heater
- List of boiler types
- Natural circulation boiler
- Outdoor wood-fired boiler – Variant of the wood stove
- Tube tool – Class of tool used to service tubing
