= Internally rifled boiler tubes =

Tubes used to evaporate water inside thermal power plant boilers

Internally rifled boiler tubes are used to evaporate water into steam inside boilers of thermal power plants. Because of their internally rifled shape, they are more efficient. The boiling crisis takes place later, thus allowing for greater heat transfer between the pipe and the fluid inside the pipe. Costs of this type of tube are generally higher than plain tubes. Current research into these tubes is being conducted due to their potential to increase efficiency of power plants.

== History ==
These tubes are sometimes called Serve tubes after the name of their French inventor. However, Serve's tubes were for use in fire-tube boilers rather than the water-tube boilers used in modern power stations and were lobed or finned rather than rifled. Later on Siemens came up with the research project and introduced the name SLMF (Siemens Low Mass Flux).

== Working ==
The internally rifled (also known as ribbed) tubes are used in boilers and heat exchangers to improve the efficiency of heat transfer. The rifling imparts a centrifugal force to the flowing fluid (commonly a mixture of steam and water). This separates water from the mixture, forces the water towards the wall, and prevents formation of a steam-film. This process increases the surface area for the maximum heat transfer when compared to smooth bore tubes.

== Advantages ==
1. Higher heat transfer rate at higher steam quality levels.
2. Better heat transfer at lower mass flux levels.
3. Reduction in the mean metal temperature of the tube walls.
4. Ability to increase the heat transfer by optimizing rifle geometry.

== Disadvantages ==
1. The manufacturing and installation costs as compared to the normal tubes are higher.
