= Electric steam boiler =

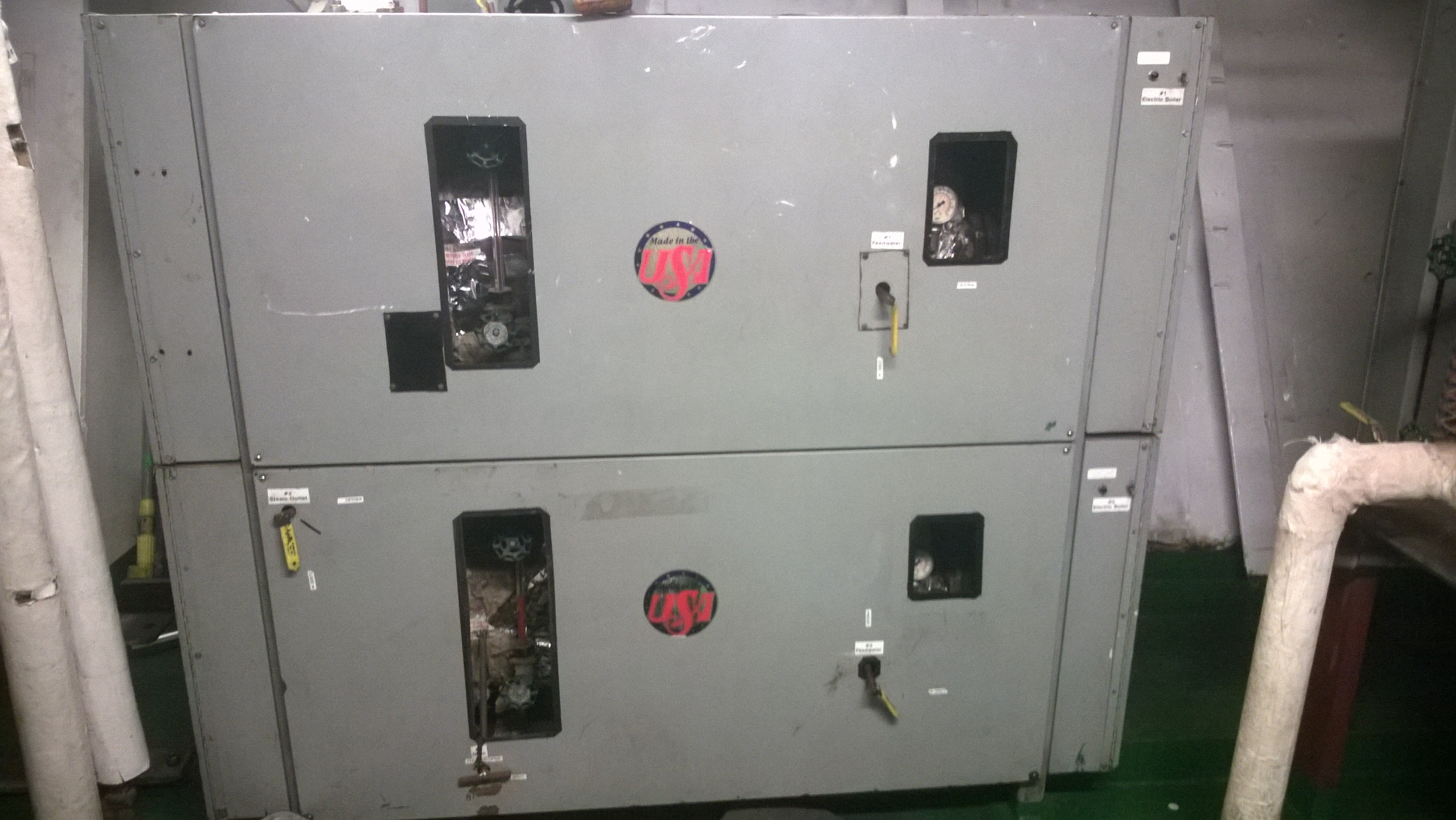
Electric steam boiler on the training ship Golden Bear

An electric steam boiler is a type of boiler where the steam is generated using electricity, rather than through the combustion of a fuel source. Such boilers are used to generate steam for process purposes in many locations, for example laundries, food processing factories and hospitals. Although they are more expensive to run than gas-fired or oil-fired boilers they are popular because of their simplicity and ease of use. Because of the large currents required, they are normally run from a three-phase electricity supply. They convert electrical energy into thermal energy with almost 100% efficiency but the overall thermal efficiency is variable, depending on the efficiency with which the electricity is generated.

== Making steam with an electric boiler ==
The process of creating steam with an electric boiler is fairly simple. Electricity is run through a heating element that acts as a resistor to create heat through resistance. Water from the system or holding tank is then run over or near this hot element in a pipe or tank, heating the water to a suitable temperature, then making the water hot enough to boil and become saturated steam, at which point the saturated steam is transported to wherever it is needed via the steam pipes that exit the body of the electric boiler. Electric steam boilers work in a very similar way to fire heated boilers with the exception of what heats the water.

== Applications ==
Electric and hybrid steam boilers are often used in industries where sustainability, energy efficiency and safety play a major role, such as the food, pharmaceutical and chemical industries. An electric steam boiler has no emissions and allows for CO2-neutral steam production.

== Advantages ==
Some experts that work with boilers on a day-to-day basis feel that electric boilers are actually superior to fuel heated boilers in a few ways. Those experts say that using electric boilers may actually be cheaper than using a fuel heated boiler, while also possibly being much more environmentally friendly. The electric boilers also require less equipment to be installed than a traditional boiler helping to reduce the high installation costs that will come with a fuel heated boiler. Electric Boilers can fit into smaller areas due to the way they are constructed and the lack of required parts that a fuel heated boiler requires to operate.

=== Safety of operation of electric boilers over fuel heated boilers ===
Traditional fuel-heated boilers generally require multiple different parts to operate successfully. In contrast, electric boilers are relatively simple devices. Additionally, because electric boilers do not use complicated forms of heat exchange, electric boilers do not contain many of the potential hazards that are commonly present in a fuel-heated boiler. Electric boilers are also generally easier to maintain because they do not need tube replacement, which fuel-heated boilers often require due to soot and fuel residue, or any of the fire maintenance required for a fuel-heated boiler. Electric boilers also have smaller carbon footprints than their traditional cousins, fuel-heated steam boilers, and require less space overall, making them a good choice for smaller operations that are in need of a boiler.

=== Other benefits ===
Some other possible benefits that should be considered are sustainability, due to their low maintenance requirements; marketability, due to the idea that "green" is better; and safety, because it is not as dangerous to run as a traditional fire heated boiler.

=== Sustainability ===
Electric steam boilers are more efficient than fire-heated boilers because they require less energy to be put into them for operation at capacity. This is because there is little energy lost when the transfer of heat from the heating element to the water occurs, unlike traditional fire heated boilers, where there is a substantial amount of energy loss from the air flow required to supply oxygen to the flame. However, if the electricity is generated by a thermal power plant, then the whole system is less efficient than a fire-heated boiler due to the greater inefficiency of the power plant. Therefore, use of electric boilers can actually consume more fuel if the electricity is generated by burning fuels.

Electric steam boilers are more easily marketable (than fire-heated boilers) to people that would use them for small applications, because it can be sold with the idea that it is "green" and therefore much better for the environment than buying and operating a fire heated boiler.

== Disadvantages ==
Electric boilers are sometimes looked down upon by some experts for multiple factors. These factors stem from the fact that the electricity that is used to power electric steam boilers has to be generated somewhere. As well as the use of electricity is its cost, especially considering that most electric boilers require a good deal of electricity to run at efficient and full capacity. Generating the power required to run an electric boiler can create just as much - if not more - pollution/emissions than burning fuel in a traditional boiler. Electricity is expensive, and with expected rises in the price of electricity, the use of it in electric boilers will come with a large price. Although there is an argument that in the event of a power outage or brownout the boiler would become unusable (in comparison to gas boilers), in fact both systems need an external power source to run, such as for pumps and valve operation and control.

== See also ==
- Electric–steam locomotive
- Steam generator (railroad)
- Electrode Boiler
