= Jetstream furnace =

Type of wood-fired water heater

Jetstream furnaces (later tempest wood-burning boilers), were an advanced design of wood-fired water heaters conceived by Dr. Richard Hill of the University of Maine in Orono, Maine, USA. The design heated a house to prove the theory, then, with government funding, became a commercial product.

== Wood-burning water furnaces, boilers and melters ==
The furnace used a forced and induced draft fan to draw combustion air and exhaust gases through the combustion chamber at 1/3 of the speed of sound (100 m/s+). The wood was loaded into a vertical tube which passed through the water jacket into a refractory lined combustion chamber. In this chamber the burning took place and was limited to the ends of the logs. The water jacket prevented the upper parts of the logs from burning so they would gravity feed as the log was consumed.

The products of combustion left the chamber and passed through a narrow ceramic neck which reached temperatures of 2000 degrees F where the gases and tars released by the wood completed their burning. The products then passed through a refractory lined ash chamber which slowed the flow and let ash settle out. From here the hot gases travelled up through the boiler tubes which pass through the water jacket. Turbulators in the tubes improve heat transfer to the water jacket.

All this resulted in total efficiencies as high as 85% but more commonly 75-80% and allowed partly dry unsplit wood to be burned just as effectively and cleanly. The particulate production was 100 times less than airtight stoves of the 1970s and 1980s and was less than representative oil fired furnaces. The Jetstream produced approximately 0.1 grams/hours of soot while EPA certified woodstoves produce up to 7.2 grams per hour. The high combustion chamber velocities do result in fine particulate flyash being ejected from the stack.

The other aspect of Dr. Hill's design was the use of water storage. The furnace only operated at one setting, wide-open burn. A full load of hardwood, approximately 40 lbs would be consumed in four hours and the heat released was stored in water tanks for use through the day.

The Hampton Industries model was designed to produce 120,000 BTU (130,000 kJ).

A Hampton Jetstream Mk II which was set to be the next model offered by Hampton Industries existed in prototype form. It was an upsized version of the unit offered for sale. The only component changed was the diameter of the burning chamber. This was enlarged within the standard casting. The prototype shares many of the design improvements seen in the Kerr Jetstream.

The Tempest was produced by Dumont Industries of Monmouth, ME, USA and is very similar to the Jetstream.

The patent for this device, termed a WoodFired Quick Recovery Water Heater, number 4583495, issued April 22, 1986, is assigned to the board of trustees of the University of Maine. There is no current production using the design of this patent. (January, 2008)

=== Production history ===
Hampton Industries of Hampton, PEI, Canada, pursued the design to fit into houses more easily.

Hampton Industries produced the Jetstream from January 1980 to June 1981 producing 500 units. At this point the company ceased operations with unfilled orders for hundreds more stoves and sales approximately 25% higher than projected. It was stated the advertising costs incurred before production depleted the principals in the business and a deal with a venture capitalist fell through at the last minute.

Within 4 weeks of entering receivership, Kerr Controls Ltd of Truro, Nova Scotia had purchased the manufacturing rights and resumed production of the slightly redesigned Jetstream in mid-September 1981 and produced 150 units just in the last quarter of 1981.

The Kerr Jetstream incorporated several updates including the available belt-driven fan replacing the Electrolux vacuum cleaner motor originally used. A removable refractory plug allowing access to the tunnel was added in the back of the unit. An updated control panel was adopted and the option of an electronic panel was added.

The design of the Hampton Industries furnaces and spare parts belong to Kerr Heating Products of Parrsboro, Nova Scotia. Some molds to replace parts still exist and are available through Kerr Controls or Kerr Heating.

=== Alternate designs ===
Current (2007) furnaces with similar designs:

- Solo Series Wood Gasification Boilers by HS -Tarm
- Alternate Heating Systems (AHS)
- The Greenwood Hydronic Wood Furnace
- Garn WHS
- Kunzel Wood Gasification Boilers
- Alternative Fuel Gasification
- The EKO-LINE and KP-PYRO Boilers and Goliath Commercial Boiler from New Horizon Corporation Inc.

These companies use a process called gasification but the basics of forced draft, twin refractory lined combustion and ash chambers linked by a ceramic or refractory burner nozzle or tube and shell and tube heat exchanger remain common.

== See also ==
- Furnace
- Hydronics
- Gasification
- Wood gas
- Wood gas generator
