= Heilmann locomotive =

Experimental steam locomotives with electric transmission

The Heilmann locomotives were a series of three experimental steam–electric locomotives produced in the 1890s for the French Chemins de fer de l'Ouest (CF de l'Ouest). A prototype was built in 1894 and two larger locomotives were built in 1897. These locomotives used electric transmission, much like later-popular diesel–electric locomotives and various other self-powered locomotives.

== La Fusée Electrique ==
La Fusée Electrique
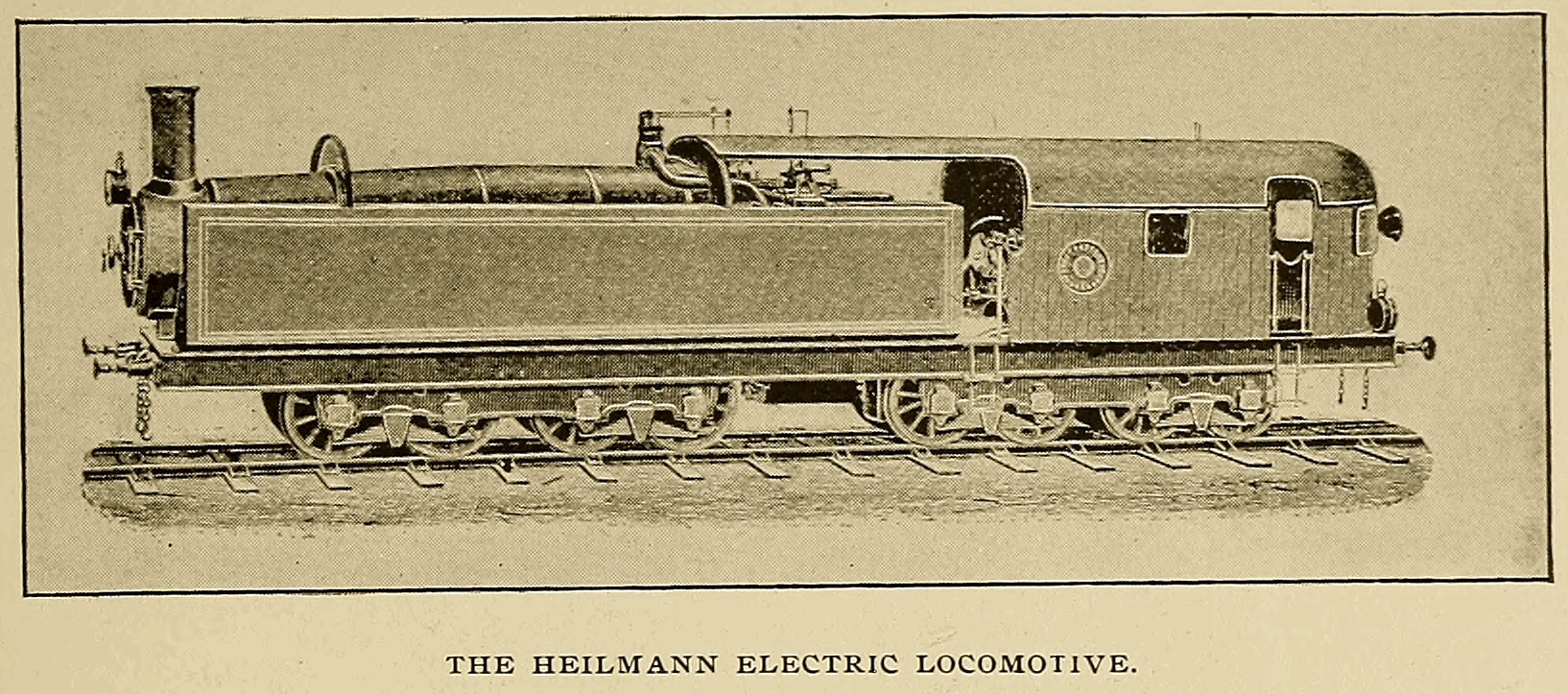
Type and origin
- Power type: Steam–electric
- Designer: Jean Jacques Heilmann
- Builder: Forges et Chantiers de la Méditerranée
- Build date: 1892–1893
- Total produced: 1
Specifications
- Configuration
  - UIC: Do'Do'
- Gauge: 4 ft 8 1/2 in (1,435 mm) standard gauge*
- Wheel diameter: 1.2 m (3 ft 11 1/4 in)
- Length: 16.5 m (54 ft 1 5/8 in) (frame)
- Loco weight: 100 t (98 long tons; 110 short tons) (empty)
- Fuel type: coal
- Fuel capacity: 6 t (5.9 long tons; 6.6 short tons)
- Water cap.: 12,000 L (2,600 imp gal; 3,200 US gal)
- Traction motors: Eight axle mounted motors
- Firebox
  - Grate area: 2.25 m^{2} (24.2 sq ft)
- Boiler pressure: 13 kg/cm^{2} (12.58 atm; 184.90 lbf/in^{2})
- Heating surface
  - Tubes: 145 m^{2} (1,560 sq ft)
- Cylinders: 2
- High-pressure cylinder: 425 mm × 300 mm (16.73 in × 11.81 in)
- Low-pressure cylinder: 650 mm × 300 mm (25.59 in × 11.81 in)
- Loco brake: Air, Disc brakes
Performance figures
- Maximum speed: 107 km/h (66 mph)*
- Power output: 80 to 100 CV (59 to 74 kW; 79 to 99 hp) / traction motor

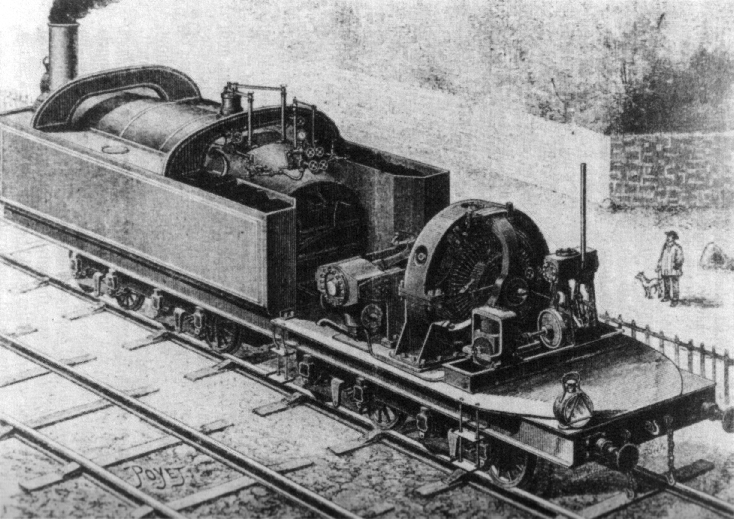
Cutaway view

In 1890, Jean Jacques Heilmann registered a patent (France No.. 207055) for a self powered electric vehicle; the design was intended to eliminate the unbalanced oscillatory moments and "hammer blow" caused by the cranked action of a conventional mechanical steam locomotive. His design used a balanced steam engine to drive the locomotive via an electrical transmission (an electrical generator driving electric motors via controlling rheostats and switches). Heilmann wished to create a machine specifically suited for high-speed trains without the high costs of an electrified infrastructure. His earliest design was of a trainset consisting of a vehicle with a triple expansion steam engine of 600 horsepower (450 kW) (Note: The horsepower figure is given as chevaux and likely to be metric horsepower, which is ~736W, and not the figure for mechanical horsepower of 746W.) and generator providing 480 horsepower (360 kW) @ 80% expected efficiency, a tender and three carriages. The entire train was to run on bogies and use a distributed traction system provided by 12 axle-mounted electric motors in the three carriages.

The first real locomotive built to Heilmann's design was a prototype steam–electric locomotive, with boiler, steam engine, generator and motors built into a single locomotive; construction began in 1892 and was completed in August 1893. On completion it was named Fusée (also known as La Fusée Électrique; English: The Electric Rocket), a reference to the 1830 Stephenson locomotive "Rocket".

The steam engine (designed by Swiss Locomotive and Machine Works (SLM) at Winterthur, Switzerland.) and boiler were built at the Forges et Chantiers de la Méditerranée in Le Havre, the electrical equipment was designed and built at Brown, Boveri & Compagnie of Baden, Switzerland, whilst the locomotive frame and bogies were built at the Compagnie de Materiel de Chemins de Fer.

The locomotive had a 600 to 800 metric horsepower (440 to 590 kW) (@ 300 to 400 rpm) two-cylinder horizontal compound steam engine with transversely mounted cylinders of 425 and 650 millimetres (16.7 and 25.6 in) diameter by 300 mm (11 4/5 in) stroke. It was supplied with steam by a Lentz-type boiler, operating at a pressure of 12.6 standard atmospheres (185 lbf/in^{2}), with a firebox of a stayless corrugated type. It had a grate area of 2.25 square metres (24.2 sq ft). The boiler had a total surface area of 145 square metres (1,560 sq ft). The engine had a fixed cutoff with no reversing mechanism, and no speed governor excluding a centrifugal overspeed safety device.

The steam engine drove directly a direct current dynamo, rated at approximately 500 kW (1,200 A @ 400 V); it was a six pole machine with the armature constructed on the Gramme dynamo principle with six brushes. The generator's field coils were energised by a separate bipolar dynamo capable of generating 100 A at 100 V (10 kilowatts (13 hp)), which was directly driven at approximately 300 rpm by a 20 CV two cylinder vertical compound steam engine of similar design to the main engine. This secondary generator's output was also used to provide a supply for electric lighting in carriages.

Electric speed and load control was obtained by reducing the main generator's field excitation current coming from the 10 kilowatts (13 hp) dynamo using a twelve step drum rheostat. (Note: The method of speed control by controlling the generator field excitation (magnetic field in the main generator) is also used in the Ward Leonard motor control system) The eight traction motors were connected in parallel; for low speed control the motors could be series connected in two sets of four connected in parallel. (Note: Ch. Jacquin (1894), "La locomotive électrique Heilmann", p. 366, "On se contente de coupler, suivant les besoins, les 8 moteurs electriques soit tous en tension, soit en quantité en 2 groupes de 4 en tension".)

The motors were located in two four-axle bogies, with wheelset having a sealed axle mounted 80 to 100 metric horsepower (59 to 74 kW) electric motor; giving a Do-Do wheel arrangement. Braking was by Westinghouse air brakes, with disc brakes fitted on all wheels. The locomotive was a cab forward design.

The first official tests of the locomotive began on 2 February 1894; performing a return working from Le Havre to Bréauté-Beuzeville (on the Paris–Le Havre railway), chosen for its difficult gradients including an 8 per mille (1 in 125) gradient over more than 10 kilometres (6.2 mi). The test train consisted of the locomotive (fully fueled to 118 tonnes), four new first class carriages, a dynamometer car, and two vans containing one tonne of batteries between them; the total train weight was 173 to 183 tonnes, depending on passenger levels. Speeds were increased over subsequent runs: the first run average 51.5 kilometres per hour (32.0 mph), on the fourth run the average speed was 59.4 kilometres per hour (36.9 mph), with speeds of 55 kilometres per hour (34 mph) on the 8‰ slopes, and 70 kilometres per hour (43 mph) on level track.

On 9 May 1894, La Fusée Electrique made a trial run from Saint-Lazare station, Paris to Mantes-la-Jolie, hauling a train consisting eight carriages. The 53 kilometres (33 mi) journey took 55 minutes. A speed of 107 kilometres per hour (66 mph) was reported to have been achieved. Following the test run, the locomotive hauled a regular service train back to Paris. Trials showed that the engine used 15% less coal than a conventional steam engine. The locomotive was said to ride "like a Pullman carriage." Criticisms of the locomotive were that it was "too complicated, too costly, too heavy". These same arguments would be repeated with the introduction of main-line diesel–electric locomotives some half a century later. The locomotive completed around 2,000 kilometres (1,200 mi) of test runs. Two larger locomotives were ordered for further trials on the CF de l'Ouest. La Fusée Electrique had been dismantled by 1897, with the bogies being used for two 0-8-0 electric locomotives which were employed on the 4 kilometres (2.5 mi) underground railway between Saint-Germain Ouest and Grande-Ceinture.

A 1/10 scale model of the prototype locomotive made in 1903 is in the collection of the Conservatoire national des arts et métiers, Paris, donated by Heilmann.

== CF de l'Ouest 8001 and 8002 ==
CF de l'Ouest Nos 8001 and 8002
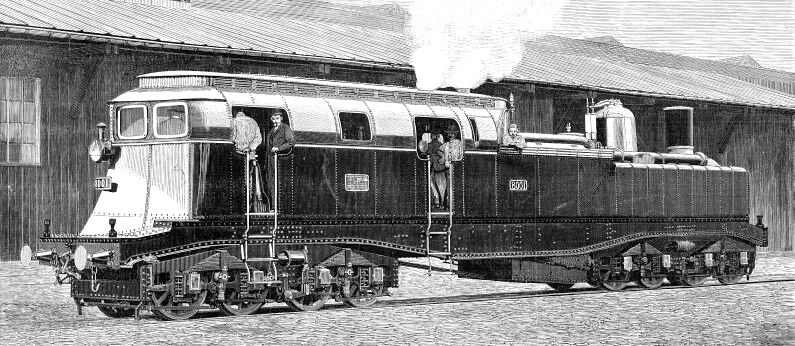
Type and origin
- Power type: Steam–electric
- Designer: Jean Jacques Heilmann
- Builder: Société Industriel de Moteurs Electrique et à Vapeur
- Serial number: 8001, 8002
- Build date: 1897
- Total produced: 2
Specifications
- Configuration
  - UIC: Do'Do'
- Gauge: 4 ft 8 1/2 in (1,435 mm) standard gauge
- Driver dia.: 1,160 mm (3 ft 9 5/8 in)
- Length: 28.35 m (93 ft 1/8 in)
- Width: 2.74 m (8 ft 11 7/8 in)
- Height: 4.19 m (13 ft 9 in)
- Loco weight: 124 t (122 long tons; 137 short tons)
- Water cap.: 20,000 L (4,400 imp gal; 5,300 US gal)
- Boiler pressure: 14 atm (14.47 kg/cm^{2}; 1,418.55 kPa; 205.74 psi)
- Heating surface
  - Firebox: 3.34 m^{2} (36.0 sq ft)
  - Total surface: 185.50 m^{2} (1,996.7 sq ft)
Career
- Number in class: 2

In 1897, two larger locomotives were built. They were numbered 8001 and 8002. The locomotives had standard Belpaire fireboxes, with a grate area of 3.34 square metres (36.0 sq ft). The steam engines were built by Willans & Robinson, Rugby, Warwickshire, United Kingdom. The boiler had a heating area of 185.50 square metres (1,996.7 sq ft) and working pressure of 14 standard atmospheres (210 lbf/in^{2}). The locomotive weighed 124 tonnes (122 long tons). The driving wheels had a diameter of 1,160 millimetres (3 ft 10 in) and were arranged in two four-axle bogies as per La Fusée. The locomotives were 28.35 metres (93 ft 0 in) long, 2.74 metres (9 ft 0 in) wide and 4.19 metres (13 ft 9 in) high. Water capacity was 20,000 litres (4,400 imp gal).

On 12 November 1897, a test run was made between the Saint-Lazare, Paris and Mantes-la-Jolie and return. On 18 November 1897, a 115-kilometre (71 mi) test run was made with speeds kept down to 30 kilometres per hour (19 mph) hauling a 50-tonne (49-long-ton) load. A speed of 100 kilometres per hour (62 mph) was attained on a later run while hauling a 250-tonne (250-long-ton) load. Although other railway companies, such as the Ohio River, Madison & Southern Railway in the United States and the Southern Railway in Russia, as well as at least one from Germany, showed interest in steam–electric locomotives, the two locomotives were nonetheless scrapped.

These engines laid work for the diesel–electric transmission, and for gas turbine and steam turbine locomotives that used an electric transmission. When one of the first diesel–electric locomotives was reported in 1905, the Automotor Journal stated it appears to be something on the Heilmann principle, that is to say the engine is employed to operate a dynamo which in turn supplies electric current to motors geared to the driving wheels.

== See also ==
- Electric–steam locomotive
- Steam turbine electric locomotive
