= Institut de recherche de la sidérurgie =

Organization

The Institut de recherche de la sidérurgie (IRSID) is the old name of ArcelorMittal Maizières Research SA, a private research center related to the steel-making company ArcelorMittal (originally (Usinor, then Arcelor)), founded in 1946 and situated at Maizières-lès-Metz, in Lorraine. Two of the Institute's three centres were closed in 1993. It employs around 500 people, including more than 200 researchers.

This research site is specialized in the following domains:

- Steel for automobile
- Steel for packaging
- Steel manufacturing procedures
