= International Flame Research Foundation =

Network of industrial flame experts

- International Flame Research Foundation
- Abbreviation: IFRF
- Formation: 1948
- Type: Non-profit educational society
- Legal status: Foundation
- Region served: Word

The International Flame Research Foundation – IFRF is a non-profit research association and network created in 1948 in IJmuiden (Netherlands), established in Livorno (Italy) between 2005 and 2016 (Fondazione Internazionale per la Ricerca Sulla Combustione – ONLUS), and in Sheffield (UK) since 2017. Meredith Thring was one of the founders.

The IFRF Membership Network unites some 1000 combustion researchers from 130 industrial companies and academic institutions worldwide, around a common interest in efficient and environmentally responsible industrial combustion, with a focus on flame studies.

== History ==
The IFRF can be traced to a proposal written in 1948 by Meredith Thring, head of the Physics Department in the newly formed British Iron and Steel Research Association (BISRA). Entitled Proposals for the Establishment of an International Research Project on Luminous Radiation, the document resulted in the formation of the International Flame Radiation Research Committee with representatives of the steel, fuel and appliance making industries in France, Holland and England - specifically the British Iron and Steel Research Association (BISRA), the Iron and Steel Research Association of France (IRSID) and the Royal Dutch Iron and Steel Company (KNHS).

== Publications ==
The IFRF is the publisher of technical reports and regular publications:

- The Industrial Combustion Journal (ISSN 2075-3071) since 1999, named IFRF Combustion Journal between Sept. 1999 and Aug. 2009 (ISSN 1562-479X),
- The Monday Night Mail - MNM - (ISSN 1562-4781) since 1999, in 1998 a few numbers of the IFRF Newsletter were also published,
- The Combustion Handbook (ISSN 1607-9116) since 2001.

Theses publications are freely available on-line.

== Events ==
The IFRF organises events to disseminate knowledge on combustion: conferences, technical meetings (called TOTeMs), common days with other technical or scientific associations and courses:

=== Topic Oriented Technical Meetings (TOTeM) ===
TOTeMs are organized since 1989, once or twice a year:

List of TOTeM organized by the IFRF and national committees
TOTeM n°	Topic	Year	Location	Country
52	Oxy-fuel combustion and CCUS	2026	Essen (GWI)	Germany
51	Green hydrogen: advances in CFD simulations of industrial hydrogen flames	2024	Calgary	Canada
50	Decarbonising combustion in hard-to-abate sectors	2023	Piacenza (Politecnico di Milano)	Italy
49	Chemical energy carriers for long-term storage and long-distance transport of renewable energies	2023	Mulhouse (LGRE)	France
48	Hydrogen for decarbonisation (European Hydrogen Week 2022 side event)	2022	Jouy-en-Josas (Air Liquide)	France
47	Additive manufacturing for combustion application	2020	Paris (Fivesgroup)	France
46	Waste-to-energy – Status and perspective of technologies	2019	Pisa	Italy
45	Gas turbines for future energy systems	2018	Cardiff	UK
44	Gaseous fuels for industry and power generation: challenges and opportunities	2017	Essen (GWI Gas- und Wärme-Institut)	Germany
43	Fired equipment safety and its associated instrumentation and control requirements	2016	Sheffield	UK
42	Industrial heating: furnaces, process heaters, kilns, design of safe and environmentally efficient thermal equipment	2014	IJmuiden	Netherlands
41	Optimisation of OXY/COAL/FGR systems – state of the art for scaling and modelling	2014	Warsaw	Poland
40	Gasification, a versatile technology converting biomass to produce synfuels, heat and power	2015	Delft	Netherlands
39	Oxy-coal Combustion	2013	Pisa	Italy
38	Tar & sulphur sampling and analysis	2013	Copenhagen	Denmark
37	Innovative and Advanced Coal Co-Firing Technologies	2012	Warsaw	Poland
36	Industrial Flares	2010	Hawaii	USA
35	Co-firing secondary fuels in power generation: from fuel characterization to full scale testing	2010	Pisa	Italy
34	Gas Turbine Research: Fuels, Combustion, Heat Transfer and Emissions	2010	Cardiff University and the Gas Turbine Research Centre, Port Talbot	UK
33	Challenges in Rotary Kiln Combustion Processes	2009	Pisa	Italy
32	Efficient solid fuel utilisation: How to overcome ash related restrictions	2008	Freising	Germany
31	Oxy-combustion technologies and applications	2008	Pisa (Enel)	Italy
30	Computational Fluid Dynamics – Simulation of Combustion Processes	2007	Waikoloa (HI)	USA
29	Characterisation of biofuels for co-combustion	2006	Munich	Germany
28	Mercury, trace metals and fine particulates – Issues and Solutions	2008	Salt Lake City (UT)	USA
27	Process heating in petroleum, petrochemical and chemical industries: Identifying trends and satisfying needs through leveraged external research	2003	Birmingham	UK
26	CO_{2} control, capture, sequestration, storage and emissions trading	2003	Birmingham	UK
25	Quest for Zero Emission in Industrial Furnaces -State of the Art and Future Development of High Temperature Air Combustion	2003	Stockholm	Sweden
24	Challenges in the development of high efficiency combustion - The Excess Enthalpy Combustion Project	2003	Velsen Noord	Netherlands
23	Efficiency and flexibility of energy use in the Iron and Steel industry: Minimise costs and CO_{2} emissions	2003	Velsen Noord	Netherlands
22	Combustion Trends in Power Generation Industries	2002	Linkebeek (Laborelec)	Belgium
21	Combustion Trends in Cement and Mineral Processing Industries,	2002	Linkebeek (Laborelec)	Belgium
20	CFD for Combustion Engineering	2002	Akersloot	Netherlands
19	Combustion oscillation and hum: Problems and opportunities	2002	Akersloot	Netherlands
18	Intelligent Combustion Control	2000	Cernay-la-Ville	France
17	The Use of Oxygen for Industrial Combustion	2000	Cernay-la-Ville	France
16	Toxic Metals and Fine Particulates from Combustion Processes	2000	Lyngby	Denmark
15	Ash and Deposit Formation in Utility Boilers	2000	Lyngby	Denmark
14	Bio-fuels - Fuel preparation, Combustion Technologies and Scope for Utilisation	1999	Växjö	Sweden
13	High Temperature Combustion Research for Industry – Results from the IFRF Research Station	1999	IJmuiden	Netherlands
12	Application of Mathematical Modelling of full Scale Industrial Processes: Status and need for Sub-Models	1999	Guernsey	UK
11	Liquid Fuels: Heavy oils wastes and slurries	1995	Biaritz	France
10	Advanced Power Generation	1994	Veldhoven	Netherlands
9	IFRF triennial planning 1995-1997 and future flame research	1994	Haarlem	Netherlands
8	High temperature combustion – High air preheat/oxygen enrichment	1993	Loughborough	UK
7	Scaling and mathematical modeling of combustion systems	1993	Chicago (GRI)	USA
6	Measurement and control diagnostics	1992	Karlsruhe	Germany
5	Waste incineration technology	1991	Bari	Italy
4	IFRF Triennial Planning 1992-94	1991	Haarlem	Netherlands
3	In-furnace NOx reduction techniques	1990	Leeds	UK
2	Fuel combustion characterisation	1990	Rueil Malmaison (IFP)	France
1	Capabilities and limitations of mathematical models of flares	1989	Amsterdam	Netherlands

=== IFRF Conferences ===
IFRF Conferences (formerly Members Conference) are organized approximately every two or three years:

List of IFRF Conferences organized by the IFRF and national committees
Conference	Year	N°	Location	Country
IFRF 2025 Conference	2025	20	Sheffield	UK
~~IFRF 2021 Conference~~ (Cancelled due to COVID-19 pandemic)	~~2021~~			
IFRF 2018 Conference "Clean, efficient and safe industrial combustion"	2018	19	Sheffield	UK
18th IFRF Members Conference "Flexible and clean fuel conversion in industry"	2015	18	Freising	Germany
17th IFRF Members Conference "Clean and efficient fuel conversion in industry"	2012	17	Maffliers	France
16th IFRF Members Conference "Combustion and sustainability: new technologies, new fuels, new challenges"	2009	16	Boston	USA
15th IFRF Members Conference "Combustion in an Efficient and Environmentally Acceptable Manner"	2007	15	Pisa	Italy
14th IFRF Members Conference	2004	14	Noordwijkerhout	Netherlands
13th IFRF Members Conference	2001	13	Noordwijkerhout	Netherlands
12th IFRF Members Conference	1998	12	Noordwijkerhout	Netherlands
11th IFRF Members Conference	1995	11	IJmuiden	Netherlands
10th IFRF Members Conference	1992	10	IJmuiden	Netherlands
9th IFRF Members Conference	1989	9	IJmuiden	Netherlands
8th IFRF Members Conference	1986	8	IJmuiden	Netherlands
7th IFRF Members Conference	1983	7	IJmuiden	Netherlands
6th IFRF Members Conference	1980	6	IJmuiden	Netherlands
5th IFRF Members Conference	1978	5	IJmuiden	Netherlands
4th IFRF Members Conference	1976	4	IJmuiden	Netherlands
3rd IFRF Members Conference	1973	3	IJmuiden	Netherlands
2nd IFRF Members Conference	1971	2	IJmuiden	Netherlands
1st IFRF Members Conference	1969	1	IJmuiden	Netherlands

=== Short courses ===
The IFRF organises short courses:

- Industrial Combustion training, Air Liquide, Jouy-en-Josas, France,18-19 March 2025,
- IFRF Hydrogen Short Course, Sheffield, UK, 2024,
- “Combustion & Emissions in Furnaces and Kilns – An Industrial Approach”, 16 to 18 October 2002, Villa Olmo – Como, Italy.
- 5th Flame Research Course, Koningshof Congress Centre, Veldhoven, The Netherlands, 1992.
- 4th Flame Research Course, Christal Hotel, Prague, Czechoslovakia, 9–13 September 1991.

=== Other events ===
The IFRF organises events with other scientific associations such as the Combustion Institute and special flame days with other national committees.

Other events (non exhaustive list)
Event	Year	Location	Country
IFRF Workshop at the 11th European Combustion Meeting: From lab scale to industrial combustion: challenges for the scale up of experimental and simulation approaches	2023	Rouen	France
Industry Roundtable at the 39th International Symposium on Combustion – Decarbonated Combustion in Industrial Processes	2022	Vancouver	Canada

== Structure ==
The IFRF is organised in 9 national committee plus the Associate Member Group (AMG) where no national committee exists.

=== Committees ===
- American Flame Research Committee - AFRC
- British Flame Research Committee - BFRC
- Chinese Flame Research Committee - CFRC
- Finnish Flame Research Committee - FFRC
- French Flame (Comité français) - CF
- German Flame (Deutsche Vereinigung für Verbrennungsforschung e.V.) - DVV
- Italian Flame (Comitato Italiano) - CI
- Dutch Flame (Nederlandse Vereniging voor Vlamonderzoek) - NVV
- Swedish Flame Research Committee - SFRC

=== Governance ===
The IFRF in managed by a Council and an Executive Committee.

=== Locations ===
From 1948 to 2005 the IFRF facilities were located in the CORUS R&D centre at IJmuiden (Netherlands).

In 2005, the research station was relocated at ENEL facilities in Livorno (Italy), the measurement programme was restarted November 27, 2006.

In 2015 a relocation of the IFRF headquarters process was initiated. Leading to the designation of University of Sheffield and its PACT laboratory as the new IFRF location from 2017.

== See also ==
- The Combustion Institute, a network of researchers specialised in combustion mainly from academia.
- The European Conference on Industrial Furnaces and Boilers - INFUB, conference related to industrial combustion.
