= Electrode boiler =

Type of steam boiler

An electrode boiler (jet type) is a type of boiler that uses electricity flowing through streams of water to create steam. The conductive and resistive properties of water are employed to carry electric current.

== Technical principle ==
The most common type of electrode boiler pumps water from the lower part of the vessel to an internal header that has nozzles that allow the water to flow to electrodes. Generally the working pressure is maintained at 10 bar. If more pressure is needed (more steam) the controls speed up the pump to increase flow through additional nozzles. As the needed pressure is reached the pump controls the flow of water to obtain the desired steam output (in unit mass per unit time) at the desired pressure. On larger systems the pump can be controlled by a variable frequency drive so energy is not wasted. This control system can also control de-aerator pumps and controls.

The electrodes are connected to a medium-voltage (1–35 kV) AC source. Electrode boilers can work on both single-phase and three-phase supplies. If DC voltage is used, electrolysis of water occurs, decomposing water into its elements H_{2} at the cathode (negative electrode) and O_{2} at the anode (positive electrode). The electrode boiler is 99.9% efficient with almost all the energy consumed producing steam. Losses are radiant heat from the vessel only.

The conductivity of the water and the voltage applied determine how much steam is generated in each stream of water.

== Advantages ==
- All electrical energy is converted to heat.
- An electrode boiler has a very quick response time.
- As it doesn't directly generate pollution, no pollution control system is needed.
- As compared to other boilers, electrode boilers experience little thermal stress.
- Electric boilers have few components making it easier to control and maintain.
- Dropping water levels inhibits current flow and allows the boiler to self-regulate.

== Drawbacks ==
- Due to the water serving as a conductor, the water becomes live at a significant portion of the input voltage. This creates a serious shock hazard when used, for example, to heat water for a bath or for tea making.
- The conductivity of water increases with temperature, also with increasing salt content, both of which may be expected to reach a peak in summer, so heating effect is greatest when it's needed least.

== Safety measures ==
When evaporated into steam, deionized or distilled water leaves few or no ions in the boiler. Thus, scale formation is reduced.
