= British Iron and Steel Research Association =

Metallurgical research consortium in the UK

- Formation: 1944; 82 years ago
- Purpose: Research association for metallurgy
- Location: London, United Kingdom
- Region served: Worldwide

The British Iron and Steel Research Association or BISRA was the research arm of the British steel industry. It had headquarters in London, originally at 11 Park Lane, later moved to 24 Buckingham Gate; it operated various laboratories in Sheffield on Hoyle Street, Swansea, Teesside, and Battersea.

The organization was initially headed by Sir Charles Goodeve, who remained its director until his retirement in 1969. Roger Eddison was hired as a manager shortly after BISRA's founding. Amongst other aspects, BISRA's research has been attributed for the automation of modern steelmaking.

During 1967, BISRA was absorbed into the recently-nationalised British Steel Corporation (BSC); it continued to operate, often in close conjunction with the wider BCS. The BISRA name was reinstated in 2002 and the entity was finally dissolved in 2015.

== History ==
The origins of the British Iron and Steel Research Association (BISRA) can be traced back to the Second World War; it was founded on 27 June 1944 to centralise British research in the field. It drew upon pre-existing cooperative research efforts commenced under the British Iron and Steel Federation's research council as well as the contact network of technical researchers within the Iron and Steel Institute. Sir Charles Goodeve, who previously oversaw research and development activities at The Admiralty, was appointed as BISRA's first director.

Upon its formation, BISRA had ten employees. Additional research labs were established or taken over from other organisations; by 1963, roughly 600 staff were employed. Amongst other areas, BISRA was a pioneer of digital computing in the steel industry.

BISRA sought to extend collaborative research efforts and bolster scientific activities and information exchange for mutual benefit. It worked with various technical bodies, trades, and industries beyond the sector but within its supply chain, including the railways, shipbuilders, plant equipment manufacturers, and civil engineers. To this end, teams were set up in Sheffield, Cambridge, Swansea, Glasgow, London, Birmingham, and Newcastle in collaboration with various universities. BISRA proved to be a valuable environment for the training and sourcing of talented people for the steel industry.

BISRA was funded principally from the British steel industry; at the time of its founding, £250,000 was contributed from industry sources towards its annual budget of £400,000. By 1967, 85 percent was contributed from a cooperative of several steelmaking companies while the remaining 15 percent came from a grant from the British government.

In practice, the varying interests of BISRA's contributing members made it was difficult to perform research outside of those areas that were common to the majority of steel makers, as they had to be willing to finance such research. Accordingly, more innovative research efforts were often undertaken by the independent research departments of each company rather than going through BISRA. While it performed the initial research on new projects, full-scale development through to completion typically involved at least one major steel produced and typically took place around a specific steelworks.

On 28 July 1967, the nationalised British Steel Corporation (BSC) was established; it incorporated the assets of numerous former private companies and separate organisations. BISRA was absorbed into BSC, although it continued to operate under its independent brand for several years thereafter. BISRA would produce new innovations, such as the spray steelmaking process, and work with BSC to commercialise it.

In 2002, the association's name was reinstated, but its revival was relatively brief, the entity being dissolved in 2015.

== See also ==
- British Steel (1967–1999)
- Steel
- Steelmaking
- Steel mill
