= List of boiler types by manufacturer =

There have been a vast number of designs of steam boiler, particularly towards the end of the 19th century when the technology was evolving rapidly. A great many of these took the names of their originators or primary manufacturers, rather than a more descriptive name. Some large manufacturers also made boilers of several types. Accordingly, it is difficult to identify their technical aspects from merely their name. This list presents these known, notable names and a brief description of their main characteristics.

== See also ==
- Glossary of boiler terminology

== A ==
Definitions	Points of Interest
Admiralty three-drum boiler: the Royal Navy's standardised pattern of three-drum boiler.; annular fire-tube boiler: a vertical fire-tube boiler with the tubes arranged radially, such as the Robertson.; annular water-tube boiler: a vertical water-tube boiler with the tubes arranged radially, such as the Straker with horizontal tubes, or near-vertically and conically as used by Thornycroft for steam wagons.; auxiliary boiler: An auxiliary boiler, on a steam ship, supplies steam that is not used for main propulsion, but is necessary for some part of the essential machinery. See also donkey boiler. A small boiler may be used as an auxiliary boiler when at sea, or a donkey boiler in port. A composite auxiliary boiler does this, using waste heat from the main engines when at sea, or is separately fired when acting as a donkey boiler. Auxiliary boilers were also present in some locomotives, in particular those used in passenger rail service, where steam was used as heating for the cars being pulled. With the advent of head end power, these steam boilers were phased out, often being replaced with concrete weights.	Thornycroft steam wagon boiler, an annular water-tube with inclined tubes

== B ==
Definitions	Points of Interest
Babcock-Johnson boiler: early production Johnson boilers operating at high pressures (850 psi [59 bar; 5,900 kPa]) and with water-wall ends to their furnace.; Babcock & Wilcox boiler; Babcock & Wilcox marine boiler; Bagnall boiler: a development of the launch boiler, with an enlarged furnace. Also known in agricultural use as the 'colonial' or 'Britannia'.; Belleville boiler: an early marine water-tube boiler developed in France by Julien Belleville.; Benson boiler: a monotube "once-through" steam generator.; Blake boiler; Blechynden boiler: An early naval water-tube boiler.; Bolsover Express boiler; box boiler: An early marine boiler with flat sides. Owing to the flat sides, even with extensive rod stays, the boilers were only suitable for low pressures. These boilers were physically large and contained a few large flues, each heated by its own furnace. The flues were round, rectangular or arched and usually long and labyrinthine.; Brotan boiler: a rarely used boiler for steam locomotives that combined a conventional fire-tube boiler barrel with a water-tube firebox. There is a prominent steam drum above the boiler barrel, making it resemble a Flaman boiler.; Brotan-Deffner boiler: a variant of the Brotan boiler. The steam drum was shortened and placed behind the boiler barrel, giving a much more conventional silhouette. Around a thousand of these were used in Hungary.; Brotan-Fialovits boiler: a further variant of the Brotan-Deffner boiler.; bundled-tube water-tube boiler; early large-tube water-tube boilers where the tubes were grouped into bundles (of 19, for geometrical reasons) that shared a common header, so as to improve shared access for tube cleaning.; Butterley boiler: a form of Cornish boiler where the furnace was opened up into a "whistle mouth", enlarging the grate area.	Babcock & Wilcox Brotan-Defner boiler firebox

== C ==
Definitions	Points of Interest
Clarke Chapman "Tyne" boiler: a form of vertical water-tube boiler, a development of the cross-tube boiler intended to encourage better water circulation.; Clarke Chapman "Victoria" boiler: a form of vertical cross-fire-tube boiler.; Clarkson thimble tube boiler: the original thimble-tube boiler, using a great many short closed-ended watertubes. Often used for heat-recovery from the exhaust of large Diesel engines.; Climax boiler: A vertical water-tube boiler with many long spiral coils around a central steam-and-water drum.; Cochran boiler: a vertical boiler with horizontal fire-tubes.; composite boiler: a boiler used for either direct-firing, or as a heat-recovery boiler.; Corner tube boiler: a natural circulation water tube boiler in which the pre-separation of steam takes place from the water-steam mixture outside the drum and the preheated downcomers.; Cornish boiler: a large horizontal stationary boiler with a single flue.; cross-tube boiler: usually a vertical flued boiler with a small number of large water-carrying cross-tubes within the firebox.; The term is also applied to vertical boilers with other arrangements of tubes, such as those with horizontal fire-tubes.: Crosti boiler:	section through a Cornish boiler Vertical flue cross-tube boiler

== D ==
Definitions	Points of Interest
De Poray boiler: patented French designs with a secondary combustion chamber to improve combustion efficiency. A vertical form of this uses field-tubes.; Doble steam-car boiler: donkey boiler: A donkey boiler is used to supply non-essential steam to a ship for 'hotel' services such as heating or lighting when the main boilers are not in steam, for example, when in port. Donkey boilers were also used by the last sailing ships for working winches and anchor capstans. See also auxiliary boiler.; du Temple boiler: An early naval water-tube boiler, patented in 1876.; Dublin "economic" boiler: a vertical multitubular return fire-tube design, for model engineering-scale uses.; Dürr boiler An early naval water-tube boiler, developed and mostly used in Germany, but also trialled in the British HMS Medusa (1888)

== E ==
Definitions	Points of Interest
egg-ended boiler: an early form of tubular wagon boiler, with hemispherical ends to support higher pressures.; Elephant boiler: an early multi-cylindered wagon boiler, popular in France.; express boiler: another term for small-tube water-tube boilers, on account of their high ratio between heating surface area and water volume, and thus their rapid steam-raising.	Egg-ended boiler with (wagon boiler behind)

== F ==
Definitions	Points of Interest
Fairbairn's five-tube boiler; Fairbairn-Beeley boiler, a fire-tube boiler with multiple joined shells of small diameter; Fairfield-Johnson boiler: a later form of Johnson boiler operating at lower pressure (450 psi [31 bar; 3,100 kPa] rather than 850 psi [59 bar; 5,900 kPa]), but still a high superheat temperature 825 °F (441 °C).; Fairlie boiler: A double-ended locomotive boiler with a central firebox, used in Fairlie's patent for double-ended articulated steam locomotives.; field-tube boiler: fire-tube boiler: A boiler with many narrow fire-tubes inside a water drum. A development of the flued boiler, where the many smaller tubes give a much larger heating surface area for the overall boiler volume.; Flaman boiler: an attempt to squeeze the largest possible locomotive boiler into the loading gauge by splitting the boiler into two drums: a fire-tube boiler beneath and a steam drum above.; flued boiler: A boiler with only one or two large diameter fire-tubes inside a water drum. These later developed into the fire-tube boiler.; forced-circulation boiler: boilers where circulation is forced by a pump, rather than relying on thermosyphon effect. These may use either forced-water-circulation (e.g. La Mont) or forced-steam-circulation (e.g. Löffler).; Foster-Wheeler boiler; D type; controlled-superheat type; ESD type (External Superheat, D type); Franco-Crosti boiler:	Flaman boiler

== G ==
Definitions	Points of Interest
Galloway boiler: a Lancashire boiler fitted with Galloway tubes. Originally these fused the Lancashire boiler's original two flues into a single kidney-shaped flue, with the tubes mounted in the joined section. Later boilers kept the cylindrical flues separate and placed the tubes within them.; gothic boiler: an early locomotive boiler, where the outer firebox was particularly large and served as the steam dome, often highly decorated with polished brass. These were popular for early railway locomotives, from 1830 to 1850.; This is another form of boiler frequently described as a "haystack".: gunboat boiler: similar to the commonly known locomotive boiler, from steam locomotives. A horizontal boiler drum contains multiple fire-tubes and a separate furnace. However, the furnace in a gunboat boiler has no opening at the bottom of the furnace to allow dumping of ash; the furnace is completely water-cooled, similar to a Scotch boiler furnace. These boilers were used in early torpedo boats and gunboats, having low height for protection from enemy gunfire.	Galloway boiler

== H ==
Definitions	Points of Interest
Harris "Economic" boiler; haystack boiler: Early balloon- or haystack-shaped, circular in plan with a domed top and often a flat base. See also Napier and gothic, quite different designs also described as "haystack" boilers.; heat-recovery boiler: a boiler without its own furnace, used to recover heat from some earlier process, such as a large marine Diesel engine or an industrial furnace.; Hornsby boiler: a form of bundled-tube water-tube boiler.; Huber boiler: a return-tube boiler used in the Huber company's traction engines.	haystack boiler

== I ==
Definitions	Points of Interest
Illingworth boiler: a water-tube boiler.; Inglis: a modified form of the Scotch boiler, with an additional combustion chamber.

== J ==
Definitions	Points of Interest
Johnson boiler: one of the first "modern" classes of high-pressure marine oil-fired water-tube boilers. They have a single steam drum above a single water drum. Their small-diameter water-tubes curve outwards on each side to form a cylindrical furnace. As there is no grate or ashpan beneath, firing must be by oil. Return circulation is by external downcomers. Early versions also used water-walls at each end of the furnace, later ones had plain firebrick walls.

== K ==
Definitions	Points of Interest
Kier: (sometimes Keeve or Kieve) an un-fired boiler, a pressure vessel heated by an external steam supply, used for bleaching in dyeworks and processing paper pulp. In use they were continuously rotated by an engine, steam being supplied through a rotating joint in the axle. They were usually spherical, sometimes cylindrical, and some were recycled from old boiler shells.; Kingdom boiler: an uncommon pattern of water-tube boiler.; Kewanee Boiler Corporation: Maker of fire tube boilers

== L ==
Definitions	Points of Interest
La Mont boiler: a forced-water-circulation boiler. They are often used as marine heat-recovery boilers. It was also used, unsuccessfully, for an experimental steam locomotive in East Germany in the 1950s.; Lancashire boiler: a development of the Cornish boiler, with two flues.; large-tube water-tube boiler: early water-tube boilers with large diameter water-tubes, of 3 inches and above, rather than the later small-tube designs.; Larsen & Toubro MHI Boilers: Super Critical Boilers.; launch-type boiler: a small fire-tube boiler used in launches and smaller steam yachts. A horizontal cylinder in form, with a cylindrical furnace and multiple fire-tubes. They have some resemblance to a small Scotch boiler or Huber boiler, but with the fire-tubes extending beyond the furnace end, rather than folded back as a return-tube boiler.; Sometimes small return-tube boilers of just this form are also described as "launch-type".: Lentz boiler A large launch-type boiler with a corrugated furnace, used rarely for some steam locomotives. Of German design. A similar boiler, the Vanderbilt, was used in the USA.; Locomobile steam-car boiler; locomotive boiler: the commonly known form familiar from steam locomotives. A horizontal boiler drum contains multiple fire-tubes and a separate firebox.; Löffler boiler: a forced-steam-circulation boiler. It was used unsuccessfully on a German steam locomotive of the 1930s.; Lune Valley boiler	Lancashire boiler Locomotive boiler

== M ==
Definitions	Points of Interest
Monotube steam generator: A single tube, usually in a multi-layer spiral, that forms a once-through steam generator. The first of these was the Herreshoff steam generator of 1873.; Multi-tube boiler: fire-tube boiler with multiple small fire-tubes, rather than a single large flue.; Mumford boiler: A form of three-drum water-tube boiler by A. G. Mumford of Colchester. The water-tubes are highly curved and the flue only covers the centre of the steam drum, not enclosing its whole length.	monotube boiler (White steam car) Mumford

== N ==
Definitions	Points of Interest
Napier boiler: A high-domed low-pressure boiler used on early steamships.; Also known as the "haystack", although not the usual, and even earlier, haystack boiler.: Niclausse boiler: a field-tube boiler, with the field-tubes set at a shallow angle to horizontal.; Normand boiler: an early three-drum boiler used mainly by the French Navy.; Normand-Sigaudy boiler: a siamesed Normand boiler, for larger ships.	Normand boiler

== O ==
Definitions	Points of Interest
One Atmosphere Boiler: A compact boiler capable of producing superheated steam to over 1000C at one atmosphere's pressure.

== P ==
Definitions	Points of Interest
Paris boiler: Paxman "economic" boiler: a form of Scotch boiler, adapted for stationary use and set in a brick surround as an external flue.; pistol boiler: a form of small locomotive boiler with a circular firebox, to avoid the need for staying.	

== R ==
Definitions	Points of Interest
Ramzin boiler or 'straight-through boiler': a once-through monotube boiler with a water-wall furnace. It was distinguished from similar boilers, such as the Benson, by its use of near-horizontal tubes in a shallow helix. It was invented by the Russian Leonid Ramzin, whilst imprisoned in a sharashka.; Rastrick boiler: a vertical heat-recovery boiler, typically used in ironworks. Owing to the conditions of their use, they acquired a poor reputation for safety and explosions.; Reed boiler: An early naval water-tube boiler.; return-flue boiler: flued boiler with a single large flue that folds back on itself. Used in early steam locomotives.; return-tube boiler: fire-tube boiler with multiple small fire-tubes that reverse the direction of gas flow within the boiler. Individual tubes are not folded: there is usually a furnace, a combustion chamber that reverses the flow, then the tubes return from that. The Scotch is a well-known example of this type.; Robertson boiler; round-topped boilers are a form of locomotive boiler, where the outer wrapper of the firebox is a semi-circular continuation of the cylindrical boiler barrel.	return-flue boiler Robertson boiler

== S ==
Definitions	Points of Interest
Schmidt boiler: a high-pressure locomotive boiler, as used for the experimental LMS 6399 Fury. To avoid the usual problems of scale formation in a highly stressed firebox, the Schmidt system uses a separate primary circuit filled with distilled water.; Scotch marine boiler; Scott boiler: Sentinel boiler; Sentinel-Cammel boiler; Sentinel-Doble boiler; Shand & Mason: shell boiler: small-tube water-tube boiler: water-tube boilers with small-diameter tubes, 2 inch or less, rather than the older large-tube designs, with tubes of 3 inch and above. Also termed Express or Speedy boilers.; Smithies boiler: A development of the pot boiler with added watertubes, used for model steam locomotives. The boiler was invented by F. Smithies in 1900 and developed by Greenly. It consists of a cylindrical water drum hidden inside a larger drum that forms the visible part of the model. Long slightly-sloping water-tubes are mounted beneath this water drum. The advantage of the boiler over similar model boilers is the use of almost the entire water drum surface for heating, although this also tends to scorch any paintwork on the outer drum, unless this is insulated. In a later development by Greenly, the backhead of the boiler becomes a double-walled water space and straight water-tubes are led into this at an angle.; Spanner boiler: a vertical multitubular fire-tube boiler, notable for its use of "Swirlyflo" fire-tubes. Spanner boilers were also known for their use as train-heating boilers.; spherical boiler: Stanley steam-car boiler: an extremely compact vertical multitubular fire-tube boiler, used in the Stanley steam car.; Steam generator: modern boilers, with very small volume in relation to their heating area. Boiling is thus almost instantaneous and the volume of heated, but unboiled, water is minimal.; Stirling boiler: an early large-water-tube boiler, used in large stationary installations.; Stone-Vapor: a monotube forced-circulation steam generator formed of a single helical water-tube.; Straker boiler: a vertical water-tube boiler for the Straker steam wagon.; submerged multi-tube boiler: a vertical multi-tubular fire-tube boiler, with the boiler shell extended upwards in an annular ring, so as to always maintain the whole length of the tubes submerged. Used in steam wagons and similar, where the water-level may be disturbed as the vehicle climbs a hill.; Sulzer boiler: a monotube "once-through" steam generator.	Scotch marine boiler

== T ==
Definitions	Points of Interest
three-drum boiler: water-tube boilers with three drums in a triangular arrangement. The best known of these are the Yarrow and Admiralty patterns. Lesser-known examples are the Normand and Mumford.; Thornycroft boiler: Several variants of an early naval water-tube boiler. Also a small annular water-tube boiler used in Thornycroft's steam wagons.; Thornycroft-Schulz boiler: a development of the marine Thornycroft boiler.; Thuile locomotive: a unique variant of the Flaman boiler using a barrel that was an elongated figure-8 section rather than circular.; transverse boiler: A boiler with the drum mounted sideways in a vehicle, such as that used by the Yorkshire Patent Steam Wagon Co.

== V ==
Definitions	Points of Interest
Vanderbilt boiler An American design, similar to the Lentz and large launch-type boilers.; Velox boiler: vertical boiler: flued or fire-tube designs where the main shell is a cylinder on a vertical axis, rather than horizontal. Boilers of this external form may have a great variety of internal arrangements.; vertical fire-tube boiler: a vertical multi-tube fire-tube boiler.

== W ==
Definitions	Points of Interest
wagon boiler: an early boiler, enlarged from the haystack to a flat-sided rectangular plan that permitted a larger grate area, but could only withstand low pressures.; water-tube boiler; Woolnough boiler: a three-drum water-tube boiler used by Sentinel.; White boiler: An early naval water-tube boiler.; White-Forster boiler; White steam-car boiler: a monotube boiler, used in the White steam car.; Woodeson boiler: a form of bundled-tube water-tube boiler.; Woolf boiler:

== Y ==
Definitions	Points of Interest
Yarrow boiler: Yorkshire steam wagon boiler: A double-ended transverse-mounted boiler used in steam wagons, to avoid problems of tilting when climbing hills. Internally it resembled a locomotive or Fairlie boiler with a central firebox and multiple fire-tubes to each end. In the Yorkshire though, a second bank of fire-tubes above returned to a central smokebox and a single chimney.	Yarrow boiler Yorkshire steam wagon
