= HMS Hyperion (H97) =

British H-class destroyer

Coordinates: 37°40′N 11°31′E

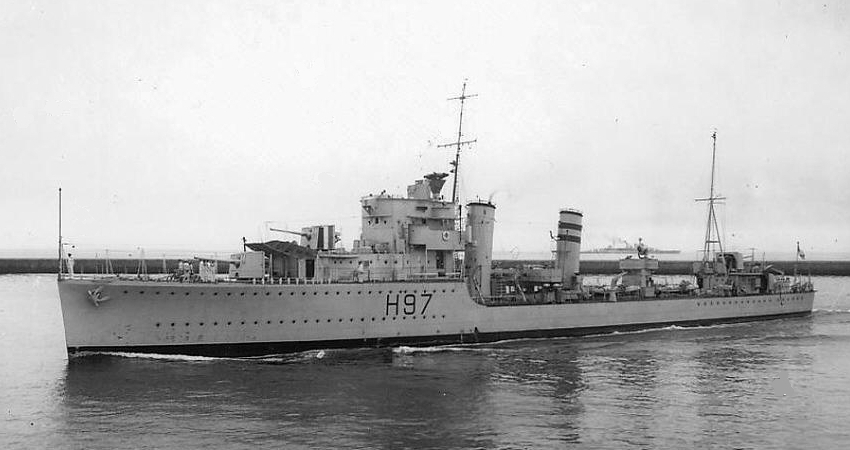

History

United Kingdom
- Name: HMS Hyperion
- Builder: Swan Hunter, Tyne and Wear
- Laid down: 27 March 1935
- Launched: 8 April 1936
- Completed: 3 December 1936
- Identification: Pennant number: H97
- Fate: Mined 22 December 1940

General characteristics as built
- Class & type: H-class destroyer
- Displacement: 1,350 long tons (1,370 t) (standard); 1,883 long tons (1,913 t) (deep load)
- Length: 323 ft (98.5 m)
- Beam: 33 ft (10.1 m)
- Draught: 12 ft 5 in (3.8 m)
- Installed power: 34,000 shp (25,000 kW)
- Propulsion: 2 shafts, Parsons geared steam turbines; 3 Admiralty 3-drum water-tube boilers
- Speed: 36 knots (67 km/h; 41 mph)
- Range: 5,530 nmi (10,240 km; 6,360 mi) at 15 knots (28 km/h; 17 mph)
- Complement: 137 (peacetime), 146 (wartime)
- Sensors & processing systems: ASDIC
- Armament: 4 × 1 - QF 4.7-inch (120 mm) Mk IX guns; 2 × 4 - .50 cal machine guns; 2 × 4 - 21 inch (533 mm) torpedo tubes; 20 × depth charges, 1 rail and 2 throwers
- Notes: Pennant number H97

HMS Hyperion was an H-class destroyer built for the Royal Navy in the mid-1930s. During the Spanish Civil War (1936–1939), the ship served with the Mediterranean Fleet, enforcing the arms blockade imposed by Britain and France on both sides of the conflict. In the early months of World War II, Hyperion patrolled the Atlantic Ocean in search of German commerce raiders and helped blockade German merchant ships in neutral ports before returning to the British Isles in early 1940.

The ship participated in the Norwegian Campaign, after which she was reassigned to the Mediterranean Fleet. In July 1940, Hyperion took part in both the Battle of Calabria and the Battle of Cape Spada while escorting larger fleet units. She later escorted several convoys to Malta. In December 1940, Hyperion struck a mine and was deliberately scuttled.

== Description ==
Hyperion displaced 1,350 long tons (1,370 t) at standard load and 1,883 long tons (1,913 t) at deep load. The ship had an overall length of 323 feet (98.5 m), a beam of 33 feet (10.1 m), and a draught of 12 feet 5 inches (3.8 m).

She was powered by Parsons geared steam turbines driving two shafts, which developed a total of 34,000 shaft horsepower (25,000 kW) and gave a maximum speed of 36 knots (67 km/h). Unlike other G- and H-class destroyers, which were fitted with three Admiralty 3-drum water-tube boilers, Hyperion uniquely used a Johnson boiler in the aft position as a trial. This O-type boiler, with a single lower water drum and curved tubes, differed from the typical triangular arrangement with two drums. The initial design suffered from poor circulation, leading to the addition of external cold downcomers, which made the reworked boiler 10% heavier. However, it was well regarded in service, as it reduced reliance on the refractory firebrick commonly used at the base of the furnace.

Hyperion carried a maximum of 470 long tons (480 t) of fuel oil, giving her a range of 5,530 nautical miles (10,240 km) at 15 knots (28 km/h). The ship's complement was 137 officers and men in peacetime, increasing to 146 in wartime.

She was armed with four 45-calibre 4.7-inch Mk IX guns in single mounts. For anti-aircraft defence, Hyperion had two quadruple Mark I mounts for 0.5 inch Vickers Mk III machine gun. She was also fitted with two above-water quadruple torpedo tube mounts for 21-inch (533 mm) torpedoes.One depth charge rail and two throwers were installed; the original load of 20 depth charges was increased to 35 shortly after the war began.The ship’s anti-aircraft armament was later augmented by replacing the rear set of torpedo tubes with a 12-pounder 12 cwt (Note: "cwt" is the abbreviation for hundredweight, 12 cwt referring to the weight of the gun.) AA gun, although the exact timing of this modification is unclear.

== Career ==
Ordered on 13 December 1934, Hyperion was laid down by Swan Hunter & Wigham Richardson at Wallsend-on-Tyne, England, on 27 March 1935. She was launched on 8 April 1936 and completed on 3 December 1936. Excluding government-furnished equipment like the armament, the ship cost £251,466. (Note: Adjusted for inflation to 2026 pounds, £15,462,522.) She was assigned to the 2nd Destroyer Flotilla of the Mediterranean Fleet upon commissioning. Hyperion patrolled Spanish waters during the Spanish Civil War enforcing the policies of the Non-Intervention Committee. The ship received an overhaul at Malta between 30 September and 30 October 1937 and resumed patrolling Spanish waters for the rest of the war. Hyperion was sent to Portsmouth for another refit in August 1939 that lasted from 16 to 27 August.

When World War II began on 3 September, the ship was en route to Freetown, Sierra Leone, to search for German commerce raiders. Hyperion was transferred to the North America and West Indies Station in late October where he blockaded various German merchant ships in American and Mexican harbours. She intercepted the German ocean liner Columbus off Cape Hatteras on 19 December, but Columbus scuttled herself before she could be captured. Hyperion was transferred to the British Isles in mid-January 1940 and began a refit at Portsmouth that lasted from 25 January to 6 March. The ship rejoined the 2nd Destroyer Flotilla of the Home Fleet at Scapa Flow.

On 5 April Hyperion escorted the battlecruiser Renown as she covered the minelayers preparing to implement Operation Wilfred, an operation to lay mines in the Vestfjord to prevent the transport of Swedish iron ore from Narvik to Germany. The ship and her sister Hero pretended to lay a minefield off Bud, Norway on 8 April and reported its location to the Norwegians. Hyperion escorted the aircraft carriers Glorious and Ark Royal from 21 April as their aircraft attacked German targets in Norway. She remained with Ark Royal when Glorious returned to Scapa Flow to refuel on 27 April. In early May the ship escorted the light cruiser Birmingham on an unsuccessful sweep of the North Sea looking for German ships.

Hyperion evacuated British personnel from the Hook of Holland from 8 to 12 May and was then ordered to reinforce the Mediterranean Fleet at Malta on 16 May. On 9 July she participated in the Battle of Calabria as an escort for the heavy ships of Force C and unsuccessfully engaged Italian destroyers and suffered no damage. During the Battle of Cape Spada on 19 July, the ship escorted Australian light cruiser HMAS Sydney and rescued some of the 525 survivors from the Italian cruiser Bartolomeo Colleoni together with the other escorting destroyers. Together with her sister Hereward and two other destroyers, she bombarded Italian positions around Sidi Barrani on 25 September. Hyperion escorted the carrier Illustrious during the Battle of Taranto on the night of 11/12 November. With Hereward, she sank the Italian submarine Naiade on 14 December 1940 near Bardia.

Hyperion struck a mine on 22 December 1940 off Pantelleria as she escorted the battleship HMS Malaya on passage from Alexandria to Gibraltar while covering a convoy to Malta. The destroyer Ilex attempted to tow Hyperion, but the tow cable broke twice and the destroyer Janus was ordered to sink her after Ilex took off the crew. Only two members of the crew were not rescued and were presumed killed in the explosion.
