= Johnson boiler =

Water-tube boiler used for ship propulsion

The Johnson boiler is a water-tube boiler used for ship propulsion.

The Johnson design was developed by the British engineer J. Johnson in the late 1920s. A patent was granted in 1931, and one of these boilers was installed in the RMS Empress of Britain. This was a time when water-tube boilers were being adopted in fast turbine ships, such as naval warships and passenger liners. There was also a shift to oil firing rather than coal burning. Oil had several advantages for a fast ship, particularly a warship that needed to combine both efficiency for long range with the ability to generate high power on demand when full speed was needed. Oil required fewer stokers, and a smaller crew required less space aboard given over to mess spaces. Refuelling was also quicker and cleaner with oil than with coal.

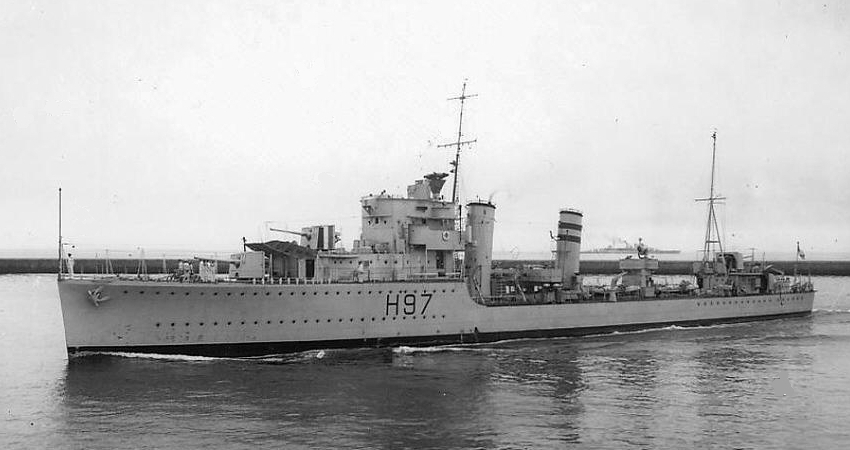
HMS Hyperion

The Johnson boiler was the first of the O-type boilers, a class of water-tube boilers characterised by single steam and water drums vertically above each other, with curved vertical water tubes to the sides forming an overall cylindrical volume. There is no grate at the base of this furnace space, so they are fired by liquid burners, rather than a solid fuel furnace producing ash.

The large radiant heating area available allows a combustion rate, for a given furnace volume, of around twice that for a contemporary boiler, such as the Yarrow. The end walls of the furnace may be either water walls with more tubes, or else simple firebrick. The small amount of brickwork for the Johnson design, without requiring a furnace base, was seen as an advantage by the Navy.

The Royal Navy trialled a Johnson boiler in 1936, when the H-class destroyer HMS Hyperion was built with two Admiralty 3-drum boilers and a Johnson, rather than the three Admiralties used for the rest of the class. This boiler had a water wall at the non-firing end. The initial design had poor circulation until external cold downcomers were added, increasing the weight by 10%.

== Babcock-Johnson boilers ==
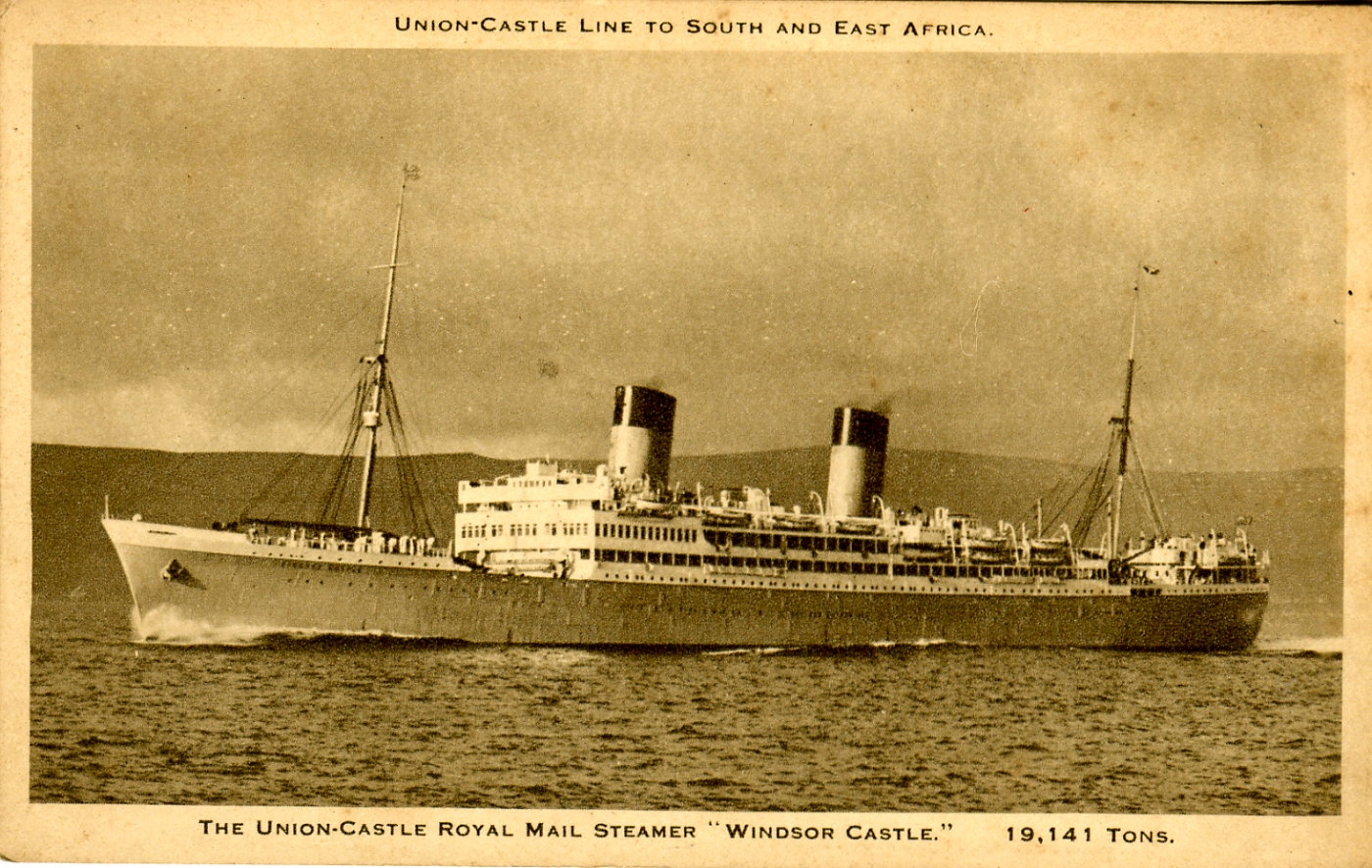
RMS Windsor Castle, and her sister ship RMS Arundel Castle, were both four-funnelled liners refitted in 1937 with Babcock-Johnson boilers and only two funnels

The Babcock-Johnson is the developed form of the Johnson design, constructed by Babcock. The end walls of the furnace are tube-walled and there are large external downcomers.

The boiler and its exhaust uptake is enclosed in an overall downward air duct, supplied through an air preheater in the exhaust stack.

Early versions of this design used a thick tube nest, split into two layers and with the superheater placed as axially-parallel tubes between these.

Later designs had thinner tube nests of only four rows of tubes, with the superheater placed in the uptake to the funnel. Working conditions would be '850/850', with a working pressure of 850 pounds per square inch (59 bar) and a steam temperature of 850 °F (454 °C). The superheater would be placed in one side of the uptake, with a reheater between the high and low pressure turbines placed in the other.

== Fairfield-Johnson boilers ==
The Fairfield-Johnson boiler is a further development of the Babcock-Johnson type. The working pressure of the boiler is reduced from around 58 bar to 30 bar, but the steam temperature after the supheater remains the same at around 825 °F (441 °C).

The engineering change for these boilers is to reduce the work done in the boiler's steam generating tubes, in favour of increased superheating. Radiant heating of the boiler tubes is the same, but there is less convective heat transfer, giving a higher superheater gas inlet temperature.
