= Package boiler =

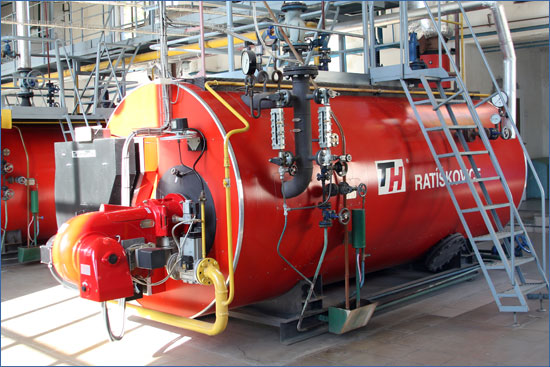
Typical gas-fired package boiler The burner and centrifugal blower is at the left. Two vertical water level gauges can also be seen.

A package boiler is a factory-made boiler. Package boilers are available in a range of standard designs. Package boilers are used for heating and act as a steam generator for small power purposes such as self-powered industrial plants. Package boilers are low pressure designs. A low pressure means low temperature water in the heat exchanger. The large difference between the flame temperature and the heat exchanger discards most of the available entropy. Discarding most of the entropy caps the thermodynamic efficiency below the range needed to make a low pressure boiler suitable for a co-generation plants even when the available capacity is adequate for the application. Advantages of package boilers are that they can be delivered and installed as a complete insulated assembly that doesn’t require a large exclusion zone around itself. The required steam, water, fuel, and electrical connections can be made rapidly. These boilers are inexpensive to operate because their automatic burner management system doesn’t require continuous supervision and they have low scheduled maintenance costs.

A great cost-saving for package boilers is their reduced need for draughting. In operation the stack gasses are cooler and less corrosive than solid fuels. They may be vented using an existing masonry chimney, or an insulated coaxial steel tube chimney. Because the burner’s blower delivers combustion air, the over-fire draught negative pressure required is nearly nil. Stack height need only be sufficient for structure safety and to clear the nuisance of the exhaust fumes. The tall chimney needed to provide a large negative pressure to draw combustion air through a bed of solid fuel is not required. In most installations a barometric damper is used to maintain a constant over-fire draught so that the air to fuel ratio remains constant instead of increasing with the increasing draught available at the stack as the outdoor temperature falls.

== Internal arrangement ==
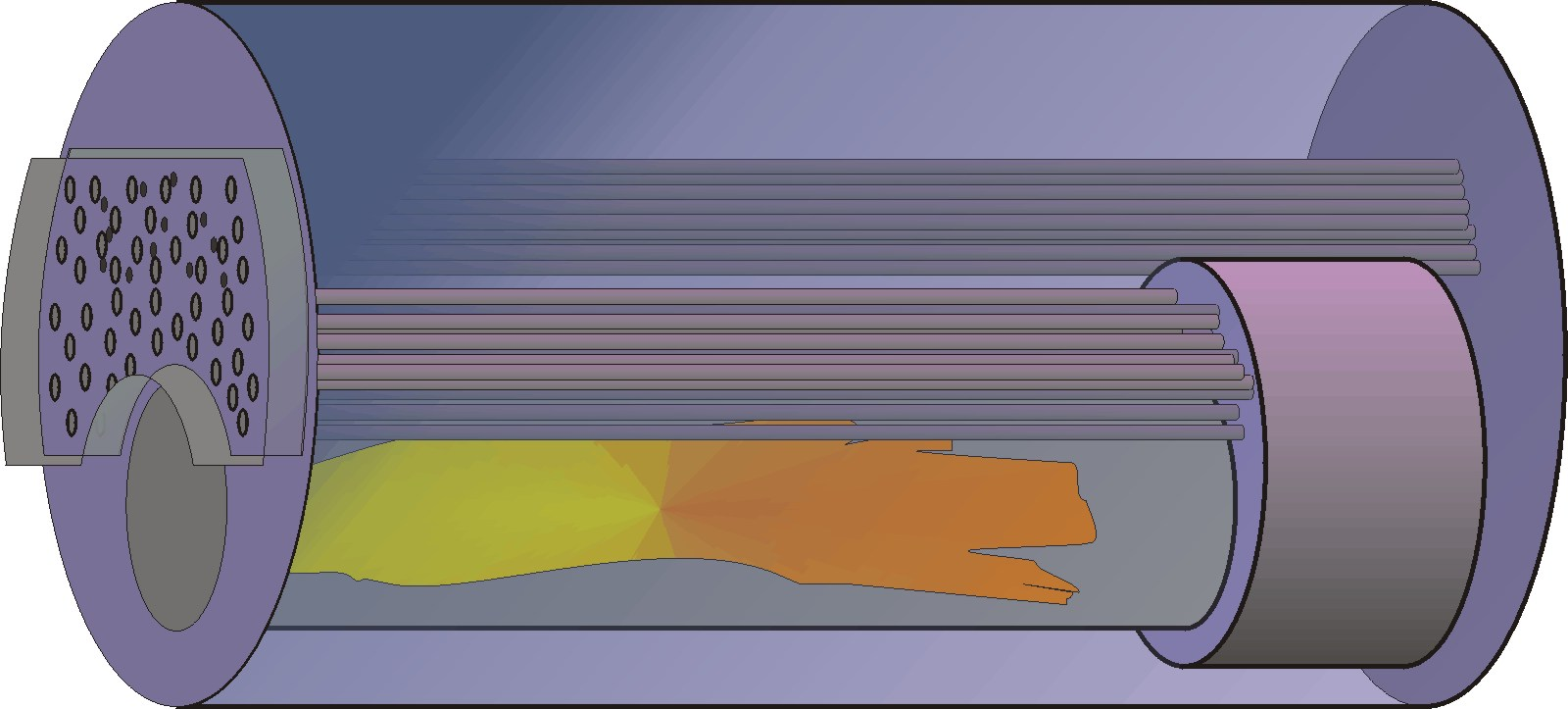
Internal layout of a three-pass fire-tube boiler

Package boilers are commonly called water or fire tube Boilers. Water tube boilers use convection heating, which draws the heat from the fire source, and passes against the generating tubes of the boiler, causing water inside those tubes to boil off into steam. The fire tube boiler arrangement utilizes conduction heating which transfers heat from physical contact. Water tube boilers are not commonly used due to their method of conduction heating because pipes in direct contact with fire and cold water could damage the pipes. The package boiler is usually a two or three-pass fire-tube boiler with an internal furnace tube. This is similar to the much earlier Scotch boiler.

Generating tubes filled with water are in direct contact with the heat source inside the boiler, causing damage to the pipes as well as scaling. These boilers however are great with steam production due to the large volume inside the boiler and the surface area of the steam output. In order for these boilers to operate properly, they require a long warm-up process, and are prone to thermal shock of the boiler. These boilers can be rated up to 500,000 lb/hr. The wall membrane of the boiler are dual welded, (welded on either side of the wall membrane) to provide extra reinforcement for high loads.

A-type, D-type and O-type are all water tube package boilers.

== Combustion ==
Package boilers are fired from fuel oil in the form of liquid or gas. Fuel is ignited in the burners which creates an explosion within the boiler. Such package boilers do not require purifiers (filters) because they burn consistently removing all contaminants within the fuel. To create constant combustion within the boiler, the forced draft fan forces air into the burner, causing a tornado effect creating turbulence to keep the flame ignited and the furnace pressurized. Other essentials such as burner electronics provide auto-ignition and on-demand lighting feature that monitors the flame and pressure within the boiler.

=== Tube Boiler ===
Package boilers are commonly called water or fire tube boilers. Water tube boilers use convection heating, which draws the heat from the fire source, and passes against the generating tubes of the boiler, causing water inside those tubes to boil off into steam. The fire tube boiler arrangement utilizes conduction heating which transfers heat from physical contact. The package boiler is usually a two or three-pass fire-tube boiler with an internal furnace tube. This is similar to the much earlier Scotch boiler.

== Pros and Cons ==
=== Pros ===
- Compact design capable to fit tight engineering spaces
- Utilizes forced or induced draft system to provide greater efficiency and better air flow
- Many tube passes which provide greater heat transfer.
- High thermal wear levels.
- Inexpensive maintenance.
- Ease of installation.
- Less costly than water tube boiler erected on site of same capacity.
- Less man power is required.

=== Cons ===
- Complex Construction
- High initial cost of package boiler
- Difficult to clean tubes within boiler
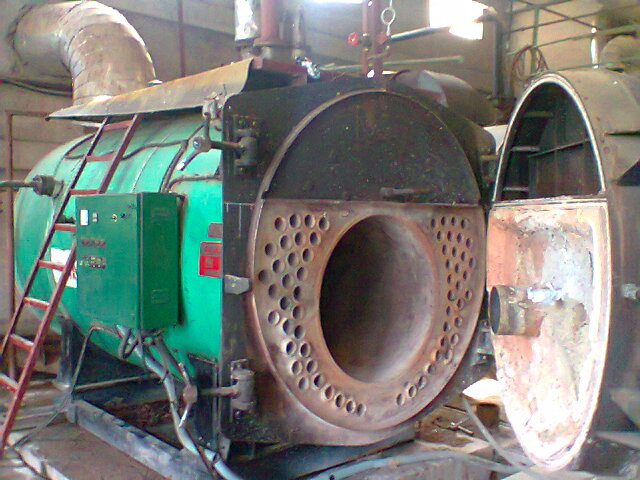
  Combustion chamber, door opened for tube cleaning
- Not suitable for very large amount of steam production

== Types of Package Boilers ==
=== The D-type Package Boiler ===
The D-type boiler has a water drum, steam drum, and generating tubes. Water flows into the steam drum, flows down the downcomers and into the water drum. Water is then sent from the water drum through the generating tubes, where the fire is located around causing water molecules to boil off into steam. Steam rises up more generating tubes and finally back into the steam drum where the dry pipe is located then into the plant. This configuration shaped the package boiler into a D-shape, hence the name D-type package boiler. These boilers are mostly used for plants that allow greater clearances.

=== The A-type Package Boiler ===
The A-type package boiler has two water drums and one steam drum compared to the D-type package boiler. Water boils off in the water drums shared by a common header, then sent up the generating tubes, into the steam drum and up the dry pipe. Just like the D-type package boiler, fire heats the tubes surroundings causing the tubes to increase in temperature thus boiling off water molecules to steam. A-type package boilers were designed to improve package boiler reliability and reduce tube replacements. A-type package boilers are smaller than D-type therefore will fit smaller plants, but does not have the same power output as D-type package boilers.

=== The O-type Package Boiler ===
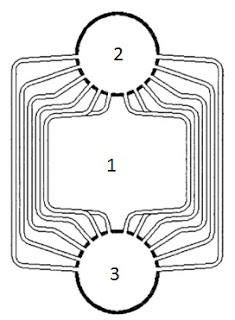
O-Type Package boiler. The boiler has two drums, one water drum and one steam drum. The combustion chamber is in the middle surrounded by downcomers and generating tubes.

The O-type boilers are a little simpler compared to D-type and A-type. They consist of one water drum and one steam drum. Generating tubes are lined up from either sides of the steam and water drums. When water boils due to convection heating, steam rises up through the tubes and into the steam drum. This is a symmetrical design for restrictive plant layouts. O-type boilers are mainly used for their fast steam production and reduced maintenance cost.
