= Spiral watertube boiler =

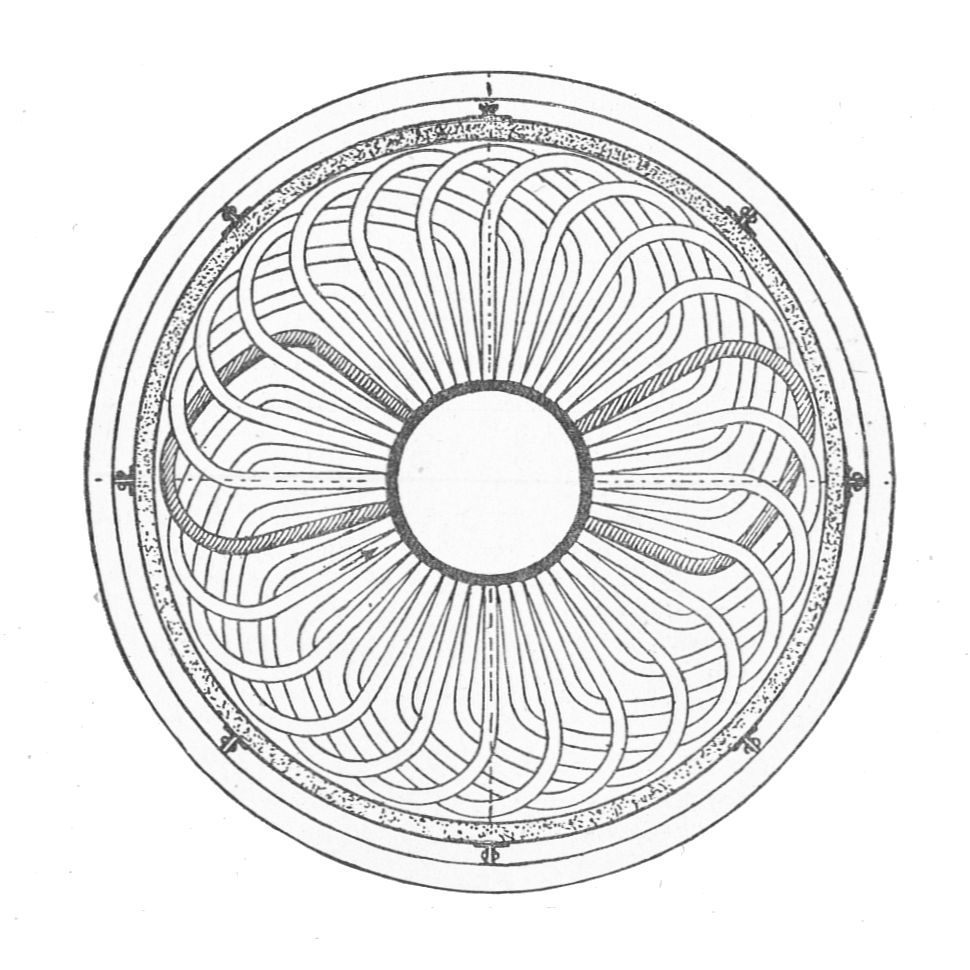
Climax boiler, arrangement of tubes from above

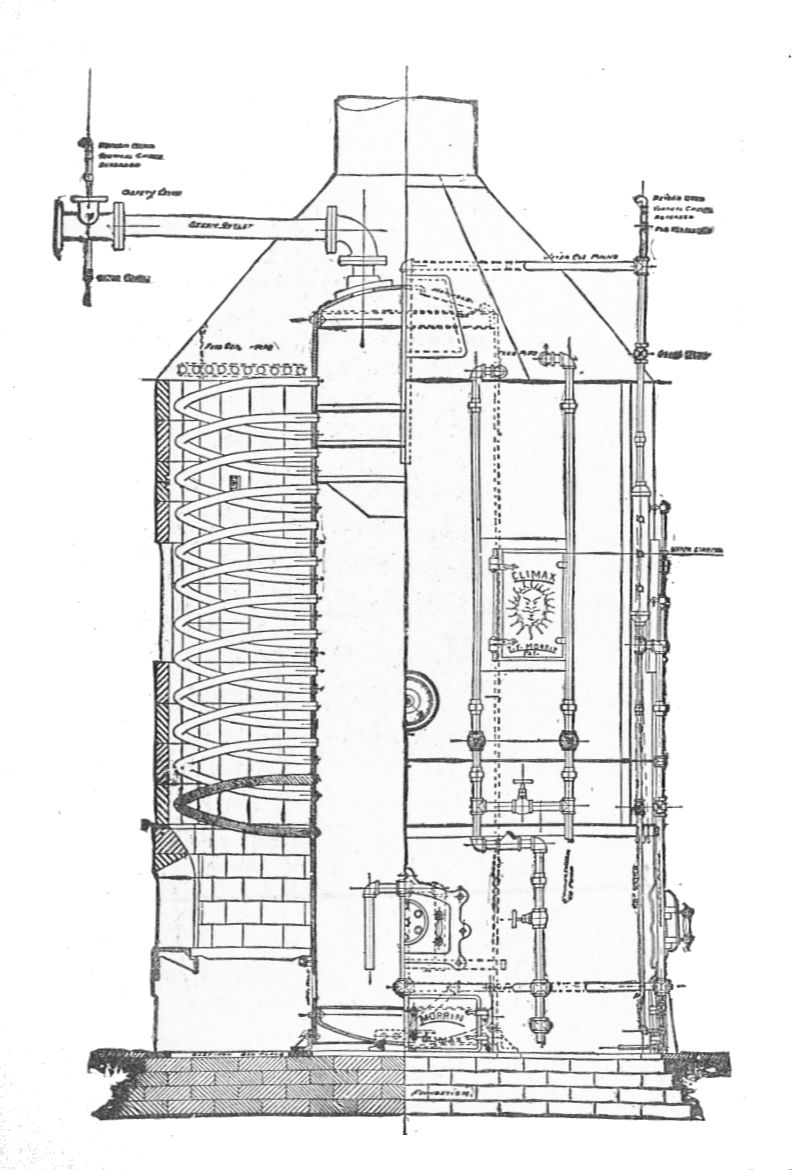
Climax boiler

Spiral water-tube boilers are a family of vertical water-tube boilers. Their steam generating tubes are narrow spiral tubes, arranged in circular fashion around a central vertical water drum.

The water tubes are long, numerous and of 2 inches (50 mm) diameter, or smaller. This gives an extremely large heating area, and so good steam raising capabilities. "A maximum fire surface is obtained in a given space, and great economies in fuel are thereby made possible."

As both drum and tubes are of small diameter, the boilers are also suitable for high pressure use. However the boilers entered service early on, as one of the first small-tube water-tube designs and so they have rarely been used for high pressures or with steam turbines.

Differences between these types of boilers are in the arrangement of their water tubes. They all share the same basic layout. The outer casing of the boiler is of steel plates, lined with firebrick, and plays no part in their heating area.

== Climax boiler ==
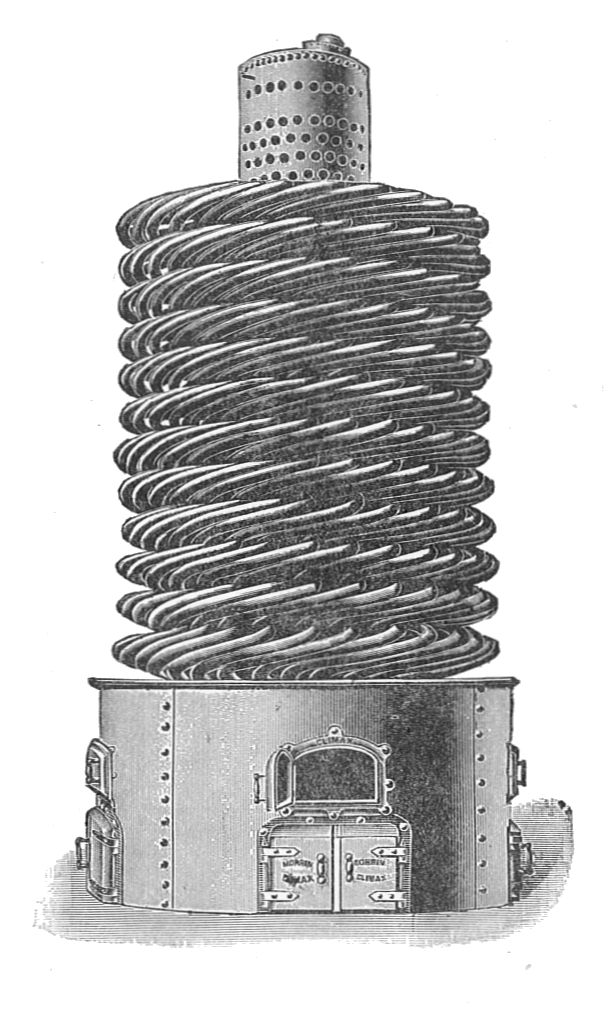
Climax boiler, casing removed

The large industrial boiler known as the Climax was one of the first of this overall type. It was invented by Thomas F. Morrin and Walter W. Scott of New Jersey and was patented in 1884.

The water-tubes were single-turn loops aligned diagonally and arranged into horizontal tiers. The upper tube entry is vertically above the lower entry of the adjacent tube. In the original patent, tubes are hairpin-shaped with radial straight sections. Later designs used a larger outer radius and "pear-shaped" tubes, finally a tube shape that was almost the radius of the outer casing. Reducing the curvature of tubes like this reduces the effects of expansion due to heating and the risk of leakage at the tube entries. The water level of these boilers was around 3/4 of the height of the tube tiers, so that the upper tubes were filled with steam rather than water. Above the tube banks a single flat spiral tube was used as an economiser or feedwater heater.

The furnace used to fire these large boilers was annular, often with four or more separate firedoors. The boiler was also successfully fired with bagasse, plant waste or refuse. Where they were used for continual high-power production, such as for electricity generation, some were also used with early automatic stokers.

One advantage of these boilers was the rapidity with which they could be constructed. A factor in this was their pre-fabricated steel casings that were bolted together in sections. Although their potential for high pressure was not made use of, they did gain a reputation for reliability and long service between overhaul.

These boilers were developed by Morrin & Scott at the "Clonbrook Steam-Boiler Works" and have no connection with either the Climax Locomotive Works or their logging locomotives. They were licensed for production to the "Clonbrook Steam-Boiler Co.", but in 1896, their previous manager Thomas J. Lawler began production of a competing boiler at the "Columbian Steam-Boiler Works" and Morrin & Scott successfully sued them for infringement of the Climax patents.

== Lune Valley boiler ==
The Lune Valley boiler was a small oil-fired boiler, used by the Lune Valley Engineering Co. of Lancaster, England for steam launches and small steamboats. Each steam generator tube consisted of three turns, giving a greater heating surface for the number of pipe joints to be made. These coils were still arranged in tiers.

An advantage for steamboat use was its rapid steam-raising from cold, the time to reach a useful pressure, rather than the rate of steam generation once hot. This was a result of two features: firstly the low mass of metal in the heating surface rose quickly to temperature. Secondly the elasticity of the spiral tubes meant that the boiler could be "forced" from cold, without the risk of damage that a locomotive- or launch-type boiler might suffer. The central drum could remain cold after the tubes were in action and boiling, without putting excessive mechanical strain on their fittings.

Lune Valley also produced another form of water-tube boiler for steam launches. This had two horizontal water drums vertically above each other, with horizontal hairpin tubes between them. This was smaller and simpler to make than the spiral form.

== Bolsover Express boiler ==
The Bolsover Express boiler was designed by Bolsover Bros. of Whitby for use in steam cars. In particular it was intended for re-boilering Stanley steam cars.

The tubes are single diagonal curves, reaching vertically from a lower ring of tube joints to an upper ring. There are fewer tubes, and less exposed surface to each tube, than for the previous designs. As the tubes are also closer to vertical, circulation within them is vigorous, they have greater evaporative power per area, and a suitably fired boiler with a liquid fuel burner may still generate a large volume of steam.

== Illingworth boiler ==
The tubes in the Illingworth boiler design are spirals, but wrapped around the central steam drum, rather than sitting alongside it. The drum has large diameter radial headers top and bottom, and the spiral steam generator tubes join into these tubes. A typical design has four headers, with the spiral tubes in four concentric helices of alternating handedness, and each tube making about three turns before joining the other header. There are thus fewer tubes, sixteen in this case, but each one is longer (between 260 and 280 bore diameters is suggested) and so the boiler is still a dense arrangement of heating area in a small space.
