= RMS Arundel Castle =

British ocean liner

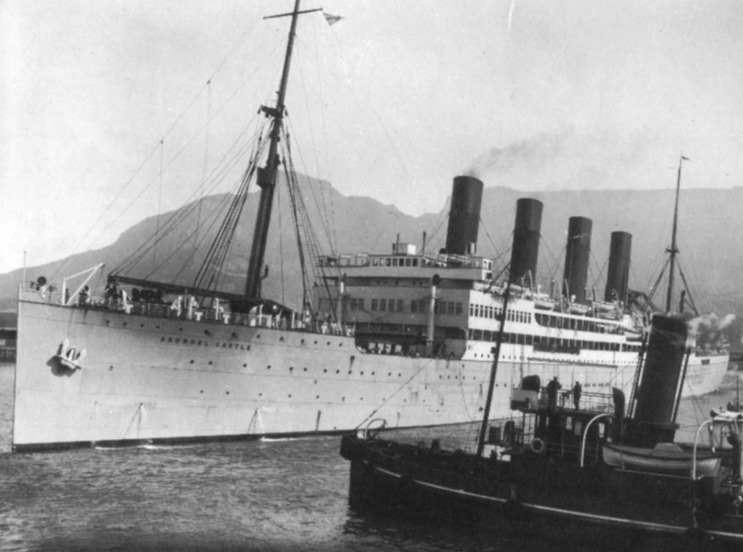
- RMS Arundel Castle at Cape Town, South Africa.

History

United Kingdom
- Name: Amroth Castle (originally); Arundel Castle
- Namesake: Arundel Castle
- Owner: Union-Castle Line
- Operator: Union-Castle Line (1921–1939, 1946–1958); Royal Navy (1939–1945)
- Port of registry: (United Kingdom) Southampton
- Route: Southampton–Cape Town
- Ordered: 1913
- Builder: Harland & Wolff, Belfast
- Yard number: 455
- Way number: 3
- Laid down: 1915
- Launched: 11 September 1919
- Completed: 8 April 1921
- Acquired: 8 April 1921
- Maiden voyage: 22 April 1921
- In service: 22 April 1921
- Identification: UK official number 145175; Code letters GCZL
- Fate: Scrapped in 1959

General characteristics
- Type: Ocean liner
- Tonnage: 19,023 gross register tons (GRT)
- Length: 661 ft (201 m), lengthened to 686 ft (209 m) during 1937 refit.
- Beam: 72 ft (22 m)
- Depth: 41.5 ft (12.6 m)
- Propulsion: Steam turbines powering two propellers.
- Speed: 17 knots (31 km/h; 20 mph); 20 knots (37 km/h; 23 mph) after 1937 refit.
- Capacity: 219 in First Class; 167 in Second Class; 194 in Tourist Class

RMS Arundel Castle was a British ocean liner and Royal Mail Ship which entered service in 1921 for the Union-Castle Line. A previous vessel of the same name was built in 1864 by Donald Currie & Co. (a predecessor to Union-Castle) and sold in 1883, whereupon it was renamed Chittagong. Originally laid down as the Amroth Castle in 1915, building was delayed by the First World War. She was eventually launched on 11 September 1919. She was completed on 8 April 1921 and in 22 April 1921 the ship departed from Southampton on her maiden voyage to Cape Town. During World War II she was requisitioned by the Admiralty to serve as a troopship. After the war she resumed passenger service, eventually being scrapped in 1959.

== History ==
=== Construction ===
Originally designed for the Union Castle Line in 1913, her keel was laid down at Harland & Wolff shipyard. She should have been completed in 1916, under the name Amroth Castle, but with the advent of World War I, construction on the ship was put on hold until November 1918. With the shortage of materials in the following years, the Union Castle Line had to wait until 1921 for the delivery of their ship. By that time, they had taken the decision to rename her Arundel Castle. Her sister ship was RMS Windsor Castle and they were the only four-funneled liners not built for transatlantic service.

=== Early career ===
On 22 April 1921 she set out on her maiden voyage from Southampton to Cape Town, South Africa. As the route took her across the Equator, she was one of the first liners to be fitted with air conditioning and a pool. She received a refit in 1937, with her four funnels being reconfigured into two, with new Babcock-Johnson boilers, her hull lengthened, and her bow remodelled from a straight stem to a more modern, angular design. She served in the Second World War as a transport in the Mediterranean.

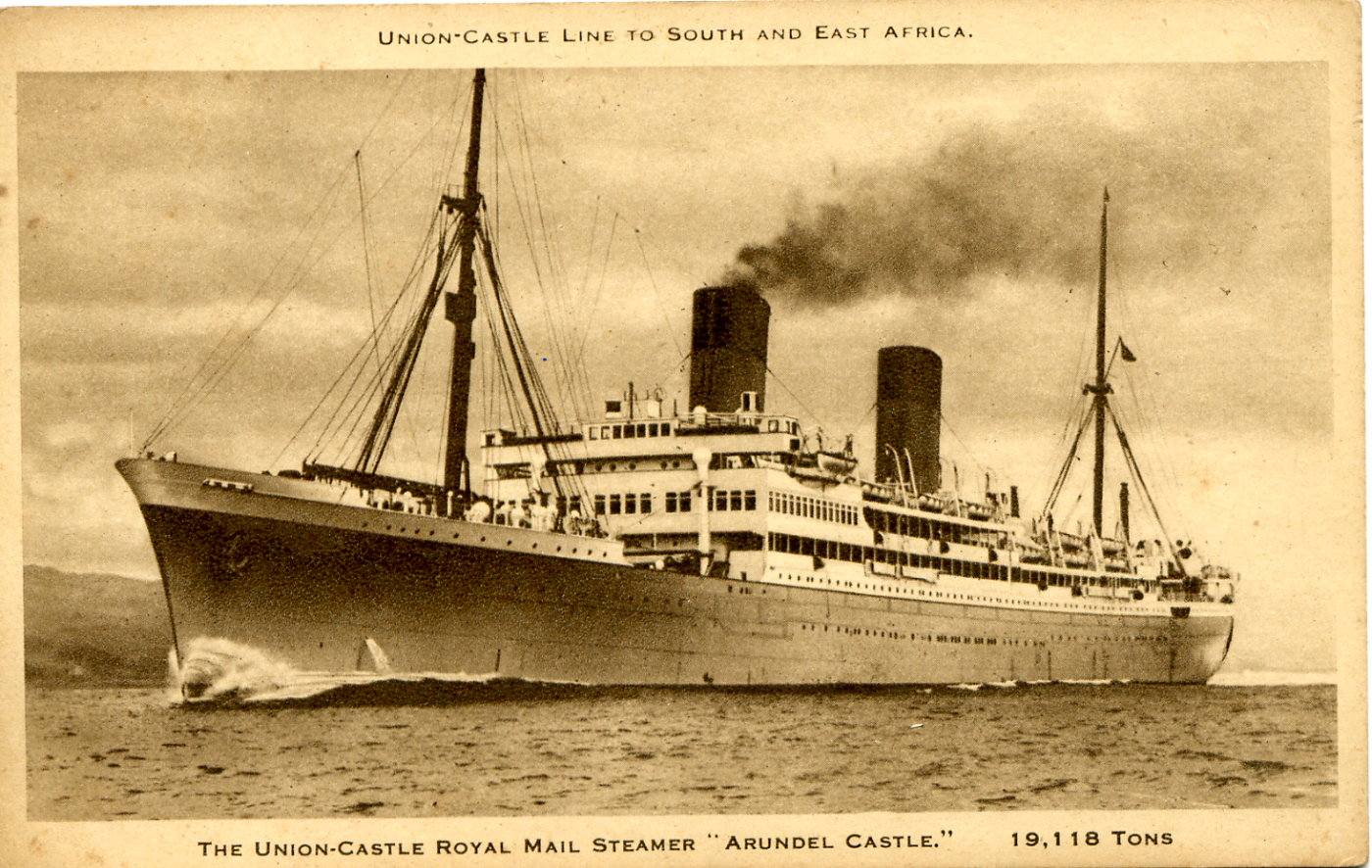
Arundel Castle after being fitted with a more raked bow and her four funnels reduced to two

=== World War II ===
On the outbreak of war in 1939, she was requisitioned by the Admiralty to serve as a troopship. She survived the war unscathed.

=== Post-war career ===
After being released by the Admiralty, she was converted back to a passenger liner to provide a service for emigrants traveling to South Africa. The end of that role in 1949 led to the ship being returned to her normal service between Southampton and Cape Town. Arundel Castle made her 211th and final voyage in 1958, leaving Cape Town on 5 December and arriving in Southampton on 19 December. On 30 December she left for Kowloon on her way to Chiap Hua, the Hong Kong ship breakers. When the ship arrived in Hong Kong harbour, Chiap Hua organised a lavish cocktail party on board the vessel with many of Hong Kong's dignitaries, including government officials and bank executives. The ship's furnishings and accessories—including the chronometers, captain's armchair, steering wheel, crockery and sterling silver cutlery—were offered as gifts. In her career she had steamed 2,850,000 miles in peace-time service and 625,565 as a troopship.

Colour film of Arundel Castle in Hong Kong can be seen in the Look at Life film, "Ticket to Tokyo," released in April 1959.
