= RMS Windsor Castle (1921) =

British ocean liner

Coordinates: 37°28′N 01°10′E

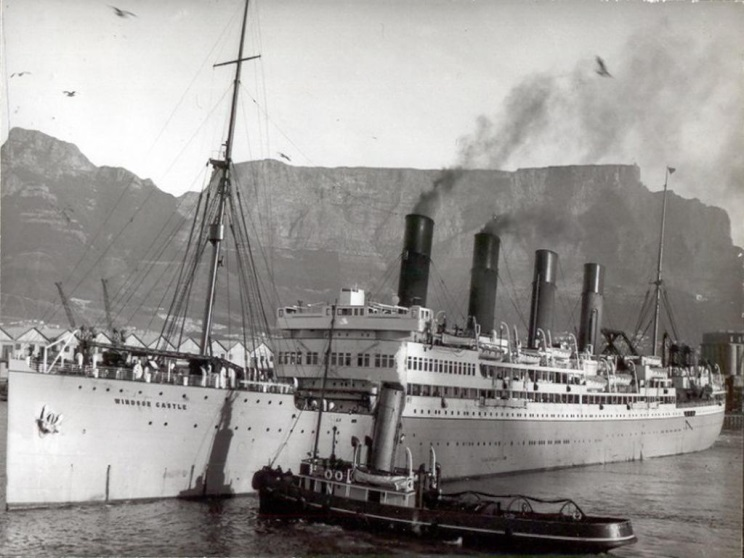
- Windsor Castle at Cape Town, South Africa.

History

United Kingdom
- Name: Windsor Castle
- Namesake: Windsor Castle
- Owner: Union-Castle Line
- Operator: Union-Castle Line (1922–1939); Royal Navy (1939–1943)
- Port of registry: Southampton, United Kingdom
- Builder: John Brown & Company, Clydebank
- Yard number: 456
- Laid down: 1916
- Launched: 9 March 1921
- Christened: 9 March 1921
- Completed: March 1922
- Acquired: March 1922
- Maiden voyage: April 1922
- Identification: UK official number 146535; Code letters GFMS
- Fate: Sunk on 23 March 1943 by a German aircraft off Algiers, Algeria
- Notes: Sister ship to RMS Arundel Castle

General characteristics
- Type: Ocean liner
- Tonnage: 18,967 GRT, 19,141 GRT after 1937 refit.
- Length: 661 ft (201 m), lengthened to 686 ft (209 m) during 1937 refit.
- Beam: 72 ft 6 in (22.10 m)
- Depth: 41.6 ft (12.7 m)
- Propulsion: Steam turbines turning two propellers.
- Speed: 17 knots (31 km/h; 20 mph); 20 knots (37 km/h; 23 mph) after 1937 refit.
- Capacity: As built 234 first class, 362 second class, and 274 third class (later reduced in 1937)

RMS Windsor Castle, along with her sister, RMS Arundel Castle, was an ocean liner laid down by the Union-Castle Line for service from the United Kingdom to South Africa. During the Second World War the Windsor Castle was requisitioned as a troopship and on 23 March 1943 was sunk by an aerial torpedo off the coast of Algeria.

== History ==
=== Construction and design ===
Originally designed for the Union-Castle Line in 1913, she was ordered from Harland & Wolff but her construction was held up by the First World War. The continuation of the war until late 1918 led Harland & Wolff to subcontract her building to John Brown & Company. Windsor Castle was not completed until 1922. The two ships were the only four-stacked ocean liners built and design for a route other than the transatlantic crossing. She had a capacity of 234 first, 362 second, and 274 third-class passengers. The liner had two masts and two propellers and could reach a top speed of 18 knots (33 km/h; 21 mph). In her refit she was given a raked bow which lengthened her from 661 ft (201 m), to 686 ft (209 m), and had her passenger capacity reduced from 870 to 604. Her top speed was increased to 20 kn (37 km/h; 23 mph), and her tonnage increased to 19,141 gross register tons.

=== Ocean Liner career ===
Windsor Castle set out on her maiden voyage from Southampton to Cape Town in April 1922. This gave the Union-Castle Line the two largest ships on that run to provide an alternating service between England and South Africa. And apart from the comforts, the ship had also been designed with safety in mind. The hull was subdivided into twelve watertight compartments and a double bottom. Furthermore, Windsor Castle was equipped with many lifeboats, with room for the ship's total capacity of passengers. Just aft of the fourth funnel, the ship had a pair of gantry davits (like those carried on HMHS Britannic) alone capable of handling twelve boats.

==== 1930s refit ====
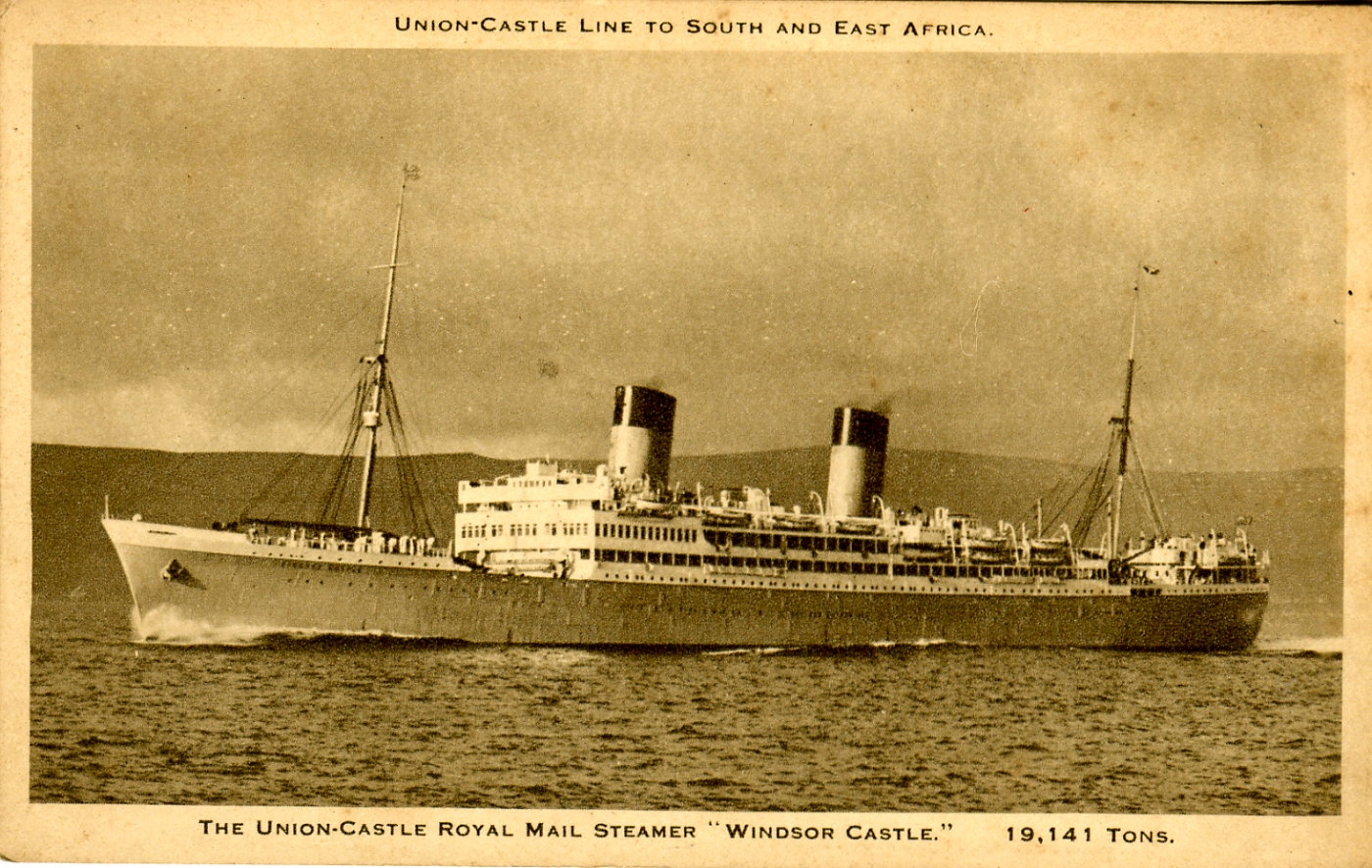
Windsor Castle after being fitted with a more raked bow and her four funnels reduced to two

During the 1930s, Windsor and Arundel were given refits to make them look more modern. This included reducing their funnels from four to two, with new Babcock-Johnson boilers, and they both were given raked, more modern bows, which slightly increased their length. Also removed were the ships' large gantry-like davits capable of carrying six lifeboats each, which were replaced with the much more common Welin davits featured on liners such as RMS Titanic.

=== Second World War and sinking ===
Requisitioned as a troopship in the Second World War, she was bombed west of Ireland in 1941 but the bomb never exploded and she reached port. She was used for transatlantic trooping from Canada and the United States in 1942. in 1943, Windsor Castle was sunk by a torpedo launched from a German aircraft while in the Mediterranean Sea as part of convoy KMF 11. She was hit at 2:30 am but did not sink until 5:25 pm, going down stern first, 110 miles (180 km) west northwest of Algiers, Algeria. Only one crewman was killed, 2,699 troops and 289 crew were rescued by the destroyers HMS Whaddon, HMS Eggesford, and HMS Douglas.
