= Corner tube boiler =

Type of natural circulation water-tube boiler

A cornertube boiler is a type of natural circulation water-tube boiler which differentiates itself from other water tube boilers by its characteristic water-steam cycle and a pre-separation of heated steam from the steam-water mixture occurs outside the drum and the unheated downcomers.

== Principle ==
Cornertube boilers were developed for small steam output. The design was based around two factors that, along with excellent water circulation, should be appropriate cooling even at light loads. Its special feature is its Monocoque body i.e. the unheated downcomers form the supporting frame work and not the thermally loaded tubes, hence the name corner tube boiler. Moreover, the piping-arrangement (system) is also responsible; to manage the riser tubes and water distribution in riser tubes and down comers and to collect the steam water mixture and to make a certain amount of pre-separation of steam and water mixture. Put simply, the water circulation takes place simultaneously through the drum and through the unheated down comers outside the drum.

== History ==
During World War II a shortage of fuels like gas and petrol alongside the idea of running diesel engines with Steam occurred and led to the development of a new type of boiler. Dr. Henrich Vorkauf came up with the first design of a new natural circulation boiler which was then installed into a truck in the year 1944. Using this principle Dr. Vorkauf developed a single drum boiler with downcomers in four corners and named this boiler Eckrohrkessel (German name). Corner Tube Boiler is word to word translation of Eckrohrkessel (Eck=Corner, rohr=tube and kessel=boiler).

== Working ==
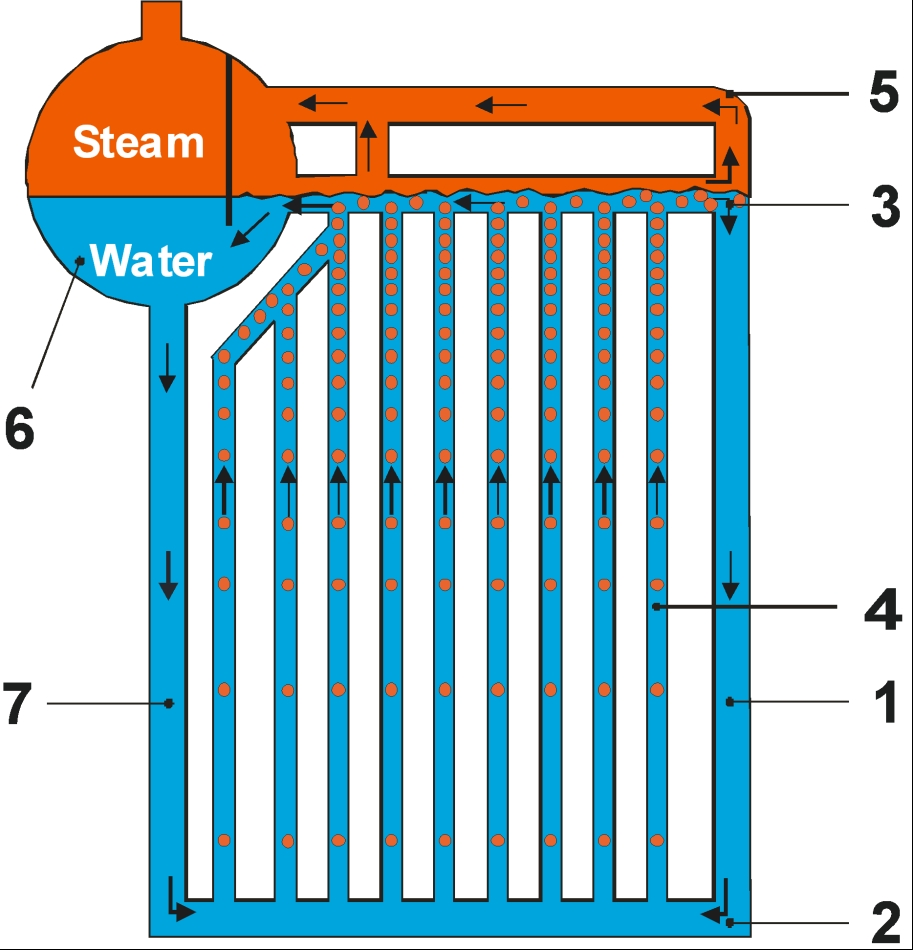
Schematic working of water circulation in corner tube boiler

The water flows down from the drum (6) through the down comers (7) and it is distributed in the different riser tubes(4). The steam-water mixture circulates and flows in the upward direction through the riser tubes. In the radiation heated area through the pre-separator (also known as cross-collector) (3) occurs the pre-separation of steam from the steam water mixture. The separated steam flows through the overhead pipe (5) and the steam-water mixture flows through the collector pipe (3) to the drum (6) as well. In the drum occurs the final separation of steam from steam water mixture. The rest amount of water flows through the unheated return tubes (1) and downcomers (7) to the rear wall distributor/header (2). Due to the water returning from the unheated downcomers (1) a lively circulation takes place .

== Advantages ==
- Self supporting construction by the four downcomers, i.e. the four downcomers in the four corners contribute to a rigid framework and requires no hanging frames or equipments.
- It can expand from the base in all directions and adapt to different operating conditions.
- The thermal expansion is from top to bottom and with the usage of grate firing the grate firing the thermal expansion difference is minimised there by manifesting the sealing between grate and the boiler.
- The shorter path of water supply to the riser tubes leads to faster and more reliable operation on different loads and a quick start up.
- It can be coupled with concentrated solar power plant (CSP) as well in order to have increased efficiency (above 33%) where the main fuels are biomass, landfill gas and wood.
- Construction and arrangement of heating surfaces is flexible as water can be supplied directly from the drum which is placed quite far away from heating surfaces.
- Low risk of Foaming. As the water and the steam-water mixture which is fed into the drum maintains the same and constant level all the time leaving the space above water level in drum (please refer to the schematic diagram pic).
- Quick load variations and reliable operation in variable loads and at any significant change in pressure as the water level in the drum is stable and remains inaffected from turbulence.
- Less steel is needed as there is no lower boiler drum and moreover the absence of lower drum eliminated unwanted thermal stresses.

== Disadvantages ==
- The designing and construction is a result of detailed engineering and hence makes it expensive.

== Fuels ==
The various fuels which can be used or are commonly used in the US, Europe and Pacific Countries are Bagasse, Biomass, Lignite, Coal, Scaly Bark, Fuel gas, Industrial waste, Khuff gas, MFO (marine fuel oil), Organic matter, Oil, Litter, Rice hulls, Rubberwood, Sludge, Wood, Woodchips.
