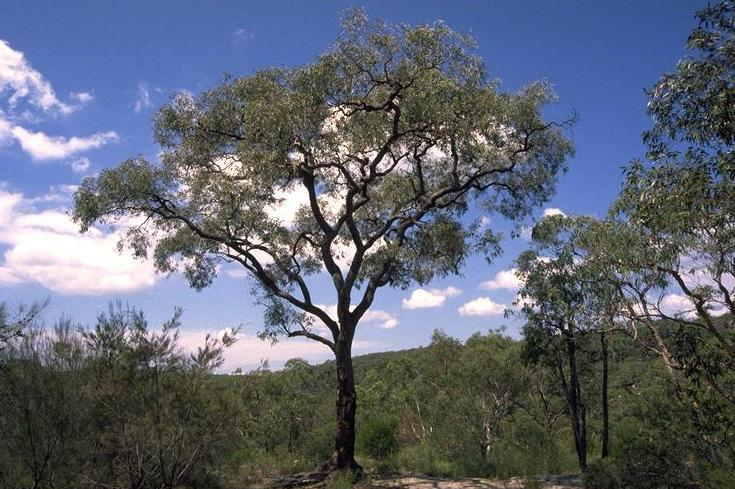
- Eucalyptus squamosa near Berowra

Conservation status
- Vulnerable (IUCN 3.1)

Scientific classification
- Kingdom: Plantae
- Clade: Tracheophytes
- Clade: Angiosperms
- Clade: Eudicots
- Clade: Rosids
- Order: Myrtales
- Family: Myrtaceae
- Genus: Eucalyptus
- Species: E. squamosa

Binomial name
- Eucalyptus squamosa Maiden & Deane

= Eucalyptus squamosa =

Scaly bark

Species of eucalyptus

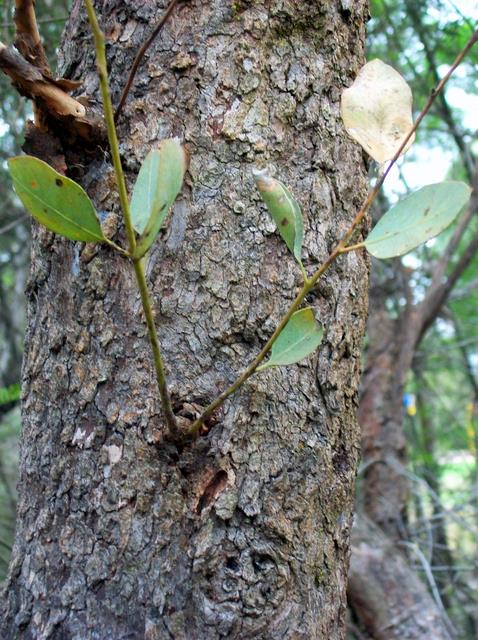
Scaly bark trunk and coppice leaves at Glenhaven

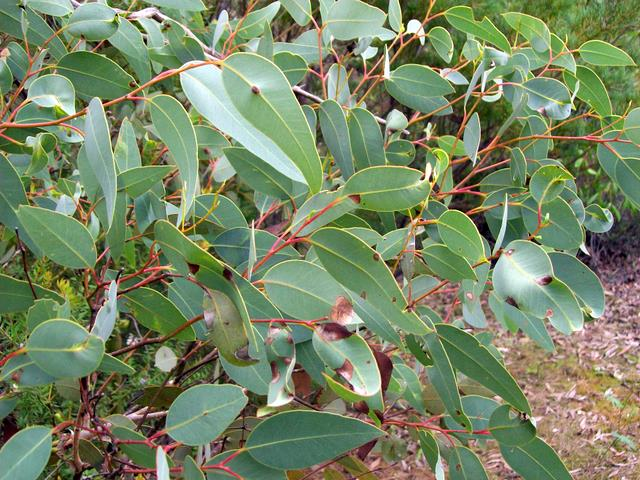
Leaves

Eucalyptus squamosa, commonly known as scaly bark, is a species of small to medium-sized tree that is endemic to the Sydney region in New South Wales. It has rough, tessellated, fibrous or flaky bark, lance-shaped or curved adult leaves, flower buds in groups of seven, nine or eleven, white flowers and cup-shaped or hemispherical fruit.

== Description ==
Eucalyptus squamosa is a tree that typically grows to a height of 12–15 m (39–49 ft) and forms a lignotuber. It has rough, grey or reddish brown, tessellated fibrous or flaky bark on the trunk and branches. Young plants and coppice regrowth have dull green to greyish, egg-shaped leaves that are 45–100 mm (1.8–3.9 in) long and 20–60 mm (0.79–2.36 in) wide and petiolate. Adult leaves are arranged alternately, the same shade of green to greyish on both sides, lance-shaped to curved, 60–130 mm (2.4–5.1 in) long and 9–20 mm (0.35–0.79 in) wide, tapering to a petiole 10–22 mm (0.39–0.87 in) long. The flower buds are arranged in leaf axils in groups of seven, nine or eleven on paired peduncles 5–13 mm (0.20–0.51 in) long, the individual buds on pedicels 1–4 mm (0.039–0.157 in) long. Mature buds are oval, 6–11 mm (0.24–0.43 in) long and 3–5 mm (0.12–0.20 in) wide with a conical to beaked operculum. Flowering occurs from October to December and the flowers are white. The fruit is a woody cup-shaped or hemispherical capsule 4–7 mm (0.16–0.28 in) long and 6–8 mm (0.24–0.31 in) wide with the valves protruding strongly.

== Taxonomy and naming ==
Eucalyptus squamosa was first formally described in 1898 by Joseph Maiden and Henry Deane in Proceedings of the Linnean Society of New South Wales. The specific epithet (squamosa) is from the Latin word squamosus, meaning "scaly", referring to the bark of this species.

== Distribution and habitat ==
Scaly bark grows in sclerophyll woodland, where soil accumulates in depressions on the sandstone on and around sandstone plateaus, often on lateritic soils. It occurs in the Sydney region, between the Putty and Broke districts and the Royal National Park.
