= Steam drum =

Component of water-tube boilers

A steam drum is a standard feature of a water-tube boiler. It is a reservoir of water/steam at the top end of the water tubes. The drum stores the steam generated in the water tubes and acts as a phase-separator for the steam/water mixture. The difference in densities between hot and cold water helps in the accumulation of the "hotter"-water/and saturated-steam into the steam-drum.

Schematic diagram of a marine-type water tube boiler-see the steam drum at the top and feed drum

== History ==
Initially the boilers were designed with 4 drums and 3 drums like the Stirling boiler. The single drum at the bottom and three drums on the top were connected through a network of tubes which were welded to the drums above and the single drum below. The rational demand of steam in terms of capacity, pressure and temperature resulted in bi drums and single drum boilers.

== Working ==
The separated steam is drawn out from the top section of the drum and distributed for process. Further heating of the saturated steam will make superheated steam normally used to drive a steam turbine. Saturated steam is drawn off the top of the drum and re-enters the furnace in through a superheater. The steam and water mixture enters the steam drum through riser tubes, drum internals consisting of demister separate the water droplets from the steam producing dry steam. The saturated water at the bottom of the steam drum flows down through the downcomer pipe, normally unheated, to headers and water drum. Its accessories include a safety valve, water-level indicator and level controller. Feed-water of boiler is also fed to the steam drum through a feed pipe extending inside the drum, along the length of the steam drum.

A steam drum is used without or in the company of a mud-drum/feed water drum which is located at a lower level. A boiler with both steam drum and mud/water drum is called a bi-drum boiler and a boiler with only a steam drum is called a mono-drum boiler. The bi-drum boiler construction is normally intended for low pressure-rating boiler while the mono-drum is mostly designed for higher pressure-rating.

On steam locomotives the steam drum is also called a steam dome.

== Types of Steam Drums ==
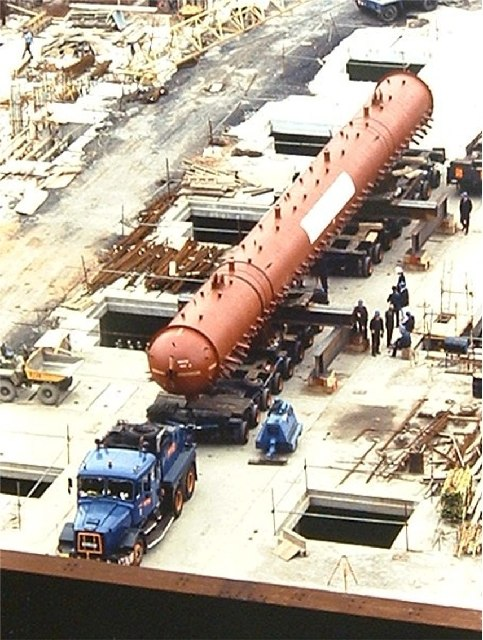
Boiler steam drum

1. Three drum/four drum boilers – are the veterans of the normal day boilers, although they are still used in some industries.
2. Bi drum boiler – are used for power generation and steam generation both. For power generation they are used now seldom and are replaced by single drum boilers as the bi drum boilers are non-reheat units. So, due to the high heat rate of the plant a single drum boiler or a once through boiler is more feasible. In process steam generation the bi drum boilers are used commonly as they can adapt to the high load fluctuation and respond to load changes.
3. Single drum boiler – are used mainly for the power plants for power generation. The pressure limit for single drum boilers is higher than that of the bi drum boilers as the stress concentration is reduced to a greater extent. There exists only one drum and the downcomers are welded to it. Single drum boilers are suitable and can adapt to both reheat and non-reheat type of boilers. They can be designed as Corner tube boiler where the frame is not required as the downcomers itself serves the purpose of it and also they are designed as top supported where the whole boiler assembly needs an external frame and supported by top drum.

== See also ==
- Once-through steam generator, does not have a steam drum
