= Stirling boiler =

Form of steam-generating furnace

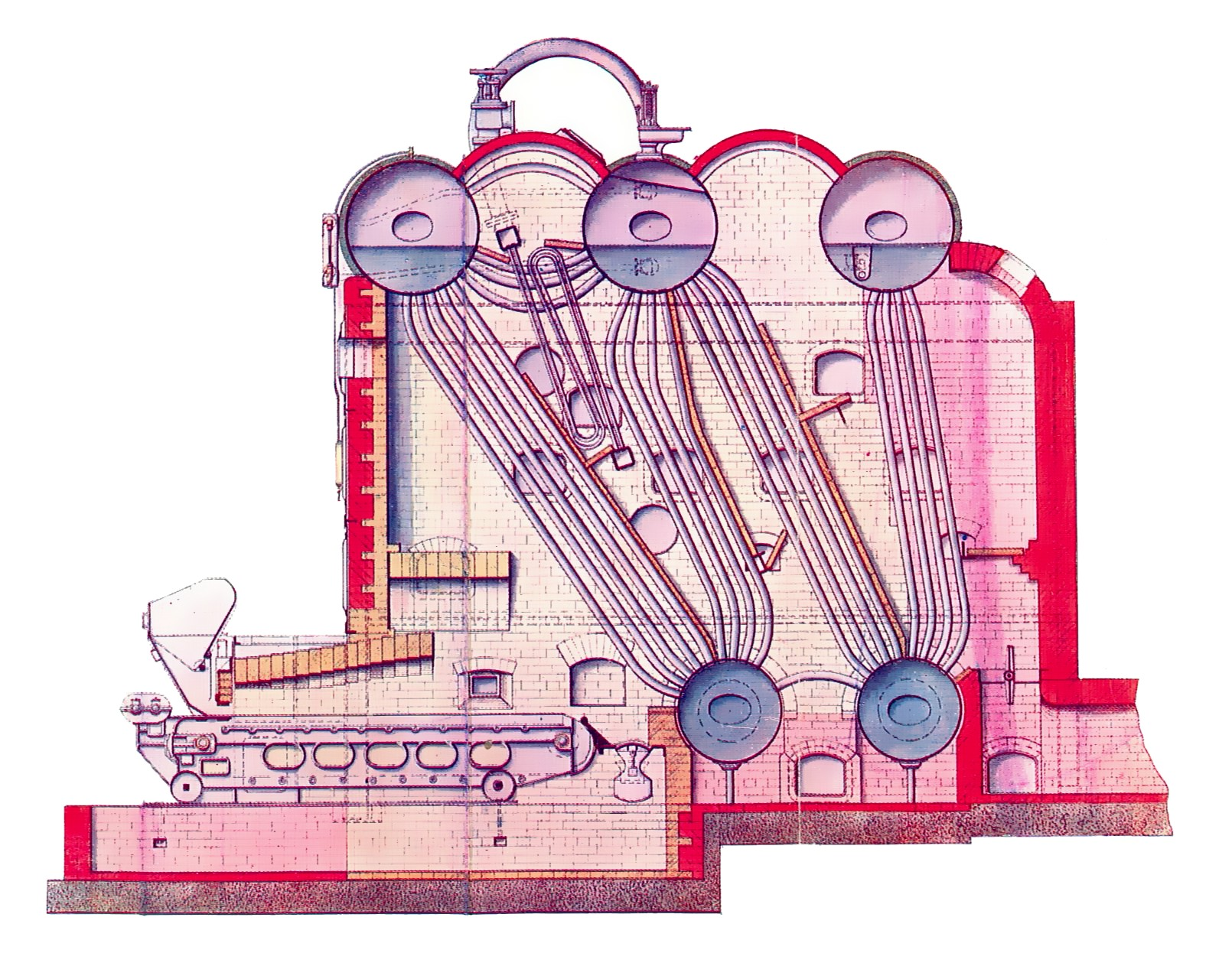
Five-drum form, section. Note the chain-grate automatic stoker (left).

The Stirling boiler is an early form of water-tube boiler, used to generate steam in large land-based stationary plants. Although widely used around 1900, it has now fallen from favour and is rarely seen.

== Design ==
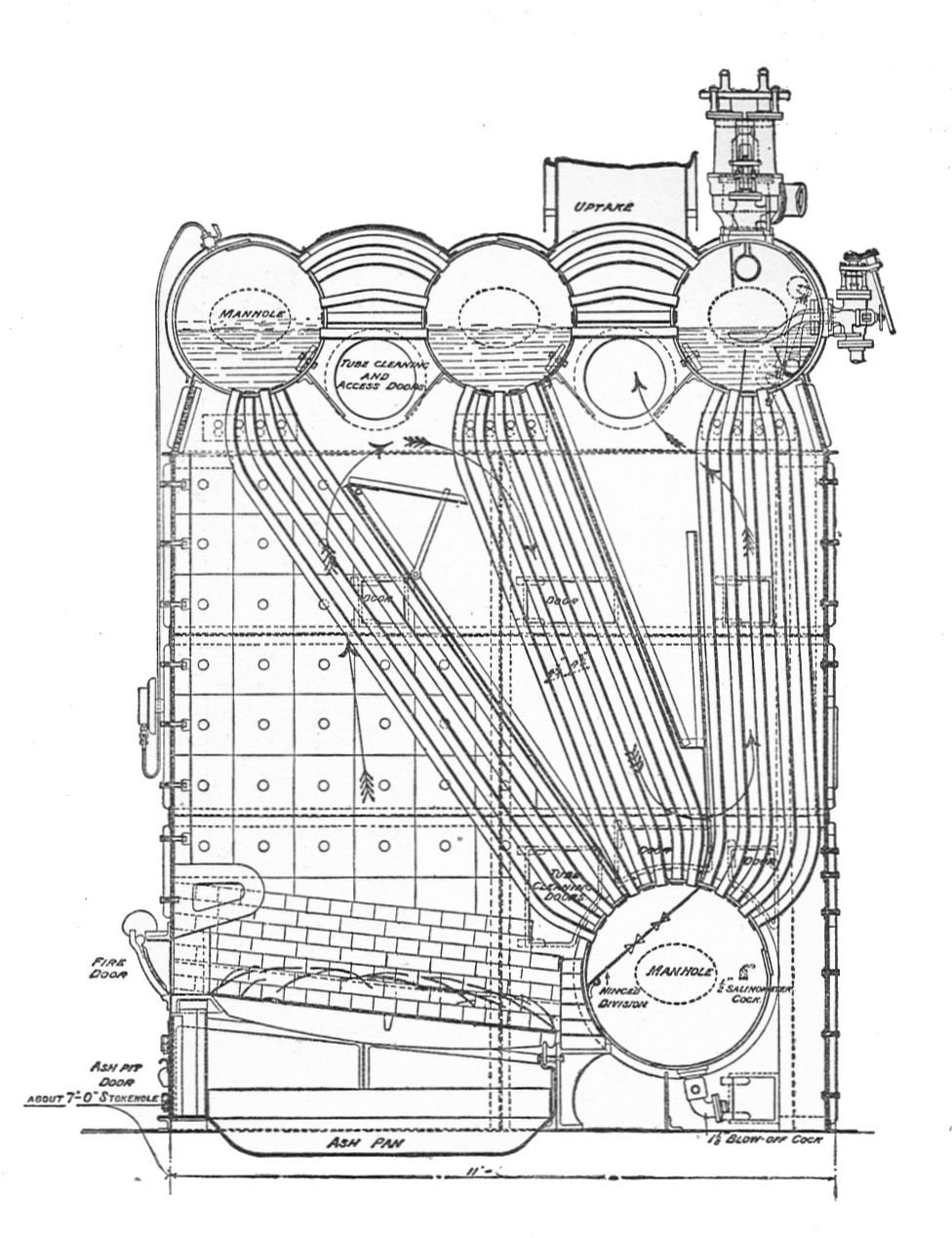
Typical four-drum form

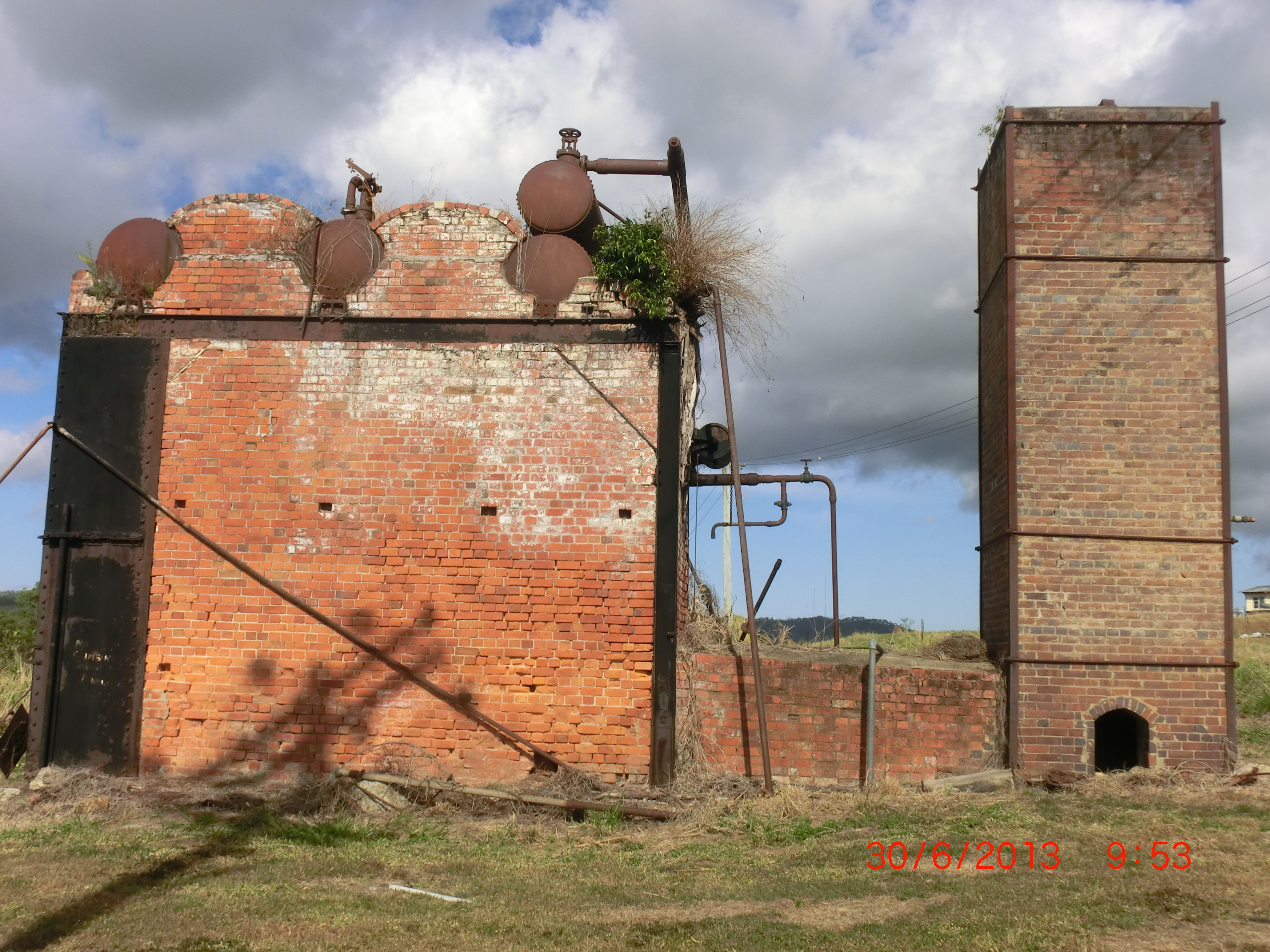
Brick enclosure of a Stirling boiler in Queensland, Australia, originally fired on sugarcane bagasse. Chimney is to the right.

Stirling boilers are one of the larger arrangements for a water-tube boiler: acceptable for stationary use, but impractical for mobile use, except for large ships with modest power requirements. They consist of a large brick-built chamber with a sinuous gas path through it, passing over near-vertical water-tubes that zig-zag between multiple steam drums and water drums.

They are amongst the older, "large-tube" designs of water-tube boilers, having water-tubes that are around 3¼ inches (83 mm) in diameter. The tubes are arranged in near-vertical banks between a number of cylindrical, horizontal steam drums (above) and water drums (below). The number of drums varies, and the Stirling designs are categorized into 3-, 4- and 5-drum boilers. The number of tube banks is one less than this, i.e. 2, 3 or 4 banks.

Gas flow from the furnace passes through each bank in turn. Partial baffles of firebrick tiles are laid on each bank, so as to force the gases to flow first up, and then down through each bank. Unusually, much of the gas flow is along the tubes' axis, rather than across them.

All circulation, both up and down, is through the heating tubes and there are no separate external downcomers. The steam drums and, (in a 5-drum boiler) the water drums, are however linked by short horizontal pipes and these form part of the circulation circuit.

The tubes themselves are seamless-drawn steel and mostly straight, with gently curved ends. The setting of the boiler is a large brick-built enclosure, but the steam drums are suspended from a separate girder framework inside this, so as to allow for expansion with heat. The tubes, and the water drums in turn, are hung from the steam drums, again to allow free expansion without straining the tube ends. Owing to their curved ends the water-tubes may enter the drums radially, allowing easy sealing, but this was also a feature considered, according to the fashion of the time, to be important on account of expansion.

Stirling boilers may be made in very large sizes. It is usual for a standard design to be used, but in varying widths, according to need.

=== Superheaters ===
Where a superheater is fitted, it is installed as straight or hairpin tubes in the upper part of the boiler between the first two steam drums. The baffles direct the gas-flow through this area first, so it may reach the highest temperature.

=== Fuels ===
A wide range of fuels may be burned, aided by a large grate area that may easily be increased further, should a poor-quality fuel require it. The original boilers were developed to burn coal, but they have been used since to burn many sorts of wood or plant waste.

A chain-fed automatic stoker may also be fitted, where a heavy firing rate is required.

The three-drum form is also used as a heat-recovery boiler, using the exhaust gases from steelworks or other industrial processes.

=== Circulation ===
As the gas flow passes through each tube bank in turn, the later banks are at a significantly lower temperature. This encourages an "extremely efficient" circulation by the thermosyphon effect. Water level is maintained with the steam drums approximately half-full, so the tubes operate in the "drowned" state with their upper ends permanently submerged.

Flow in the first bank is upwards as the tubes are heated, encouraged by their almost vertical position. Cooler water in the later water-tubes descends. Circulation is completed by the link pipes between the steam drums. Circulation is more active in the earlier, hotter circuits.

In the four-drum form, circulation within the middle bank may be split between a descending circuit with the first bank and an ascending circuit with the following bank.

==== Feedwater ====
Feedwater is supplied to the final steam drum and distributed via an internal trough. The cold feedwater descends slowly through the last tube bank and into the last water drum.

Any precipitable deposits (colloquially, "mud") will emerge from solution in this circuit and accumulate in the final water drum. This keeps them away from the more active early tube banks, reducing the problems and inefficiencies of scale build-up within the major heating tubes. Since the final water drum may also be used to catch the "mud" (i.e. a "mud collector"), it is sometimes known as a "mud drum".

=== Advantages ===
There are three advantages to the Stirling design:

- Owing to the multiple passes through the tube banks and the careful arrangement of circulation and feedwater, the boiler is generally quite efficient.
- The grate area may easily be varied without affecting the design of the water circuit. This allows the use of large grates for burning low-grade fuels, such as waste and refuse. Where an industrial process both required process steam and also generated combustible waste products, the Stirling boiler could use one to generate the other. This was commonly done in sugar refining, burning bagasse, or in paper pulp mills burning bark waste. The Stirling boiler was also used before World War II to burn domestic waste in cities, the steam then being used for power generation. (Emissions controls in later years made this burning of 'uncontrolled' waste impractical).
- Finally, internal access to components is good for cleaning and maintenance. In particular, it is possible to replace individual water-tubes, without needing to dismantle an entire bank.

=== Disadvantages ===
- The boiler is physically large for its power.
- Use of large diameter tubes restricts its ability to deal with high pressures, as other designs were beginning to do around this time. A working pressure of 150 psi (1,000 kPa) was adequate for driving a compound steam engine, but inefficient for a steam turbine.
- The arrangement of tubes encouraged efficiency in the boiler, but not superheater temperature. Again, as developments moved away from piston engines in favour of turbines, this became a significant limitation.

== Variations ==
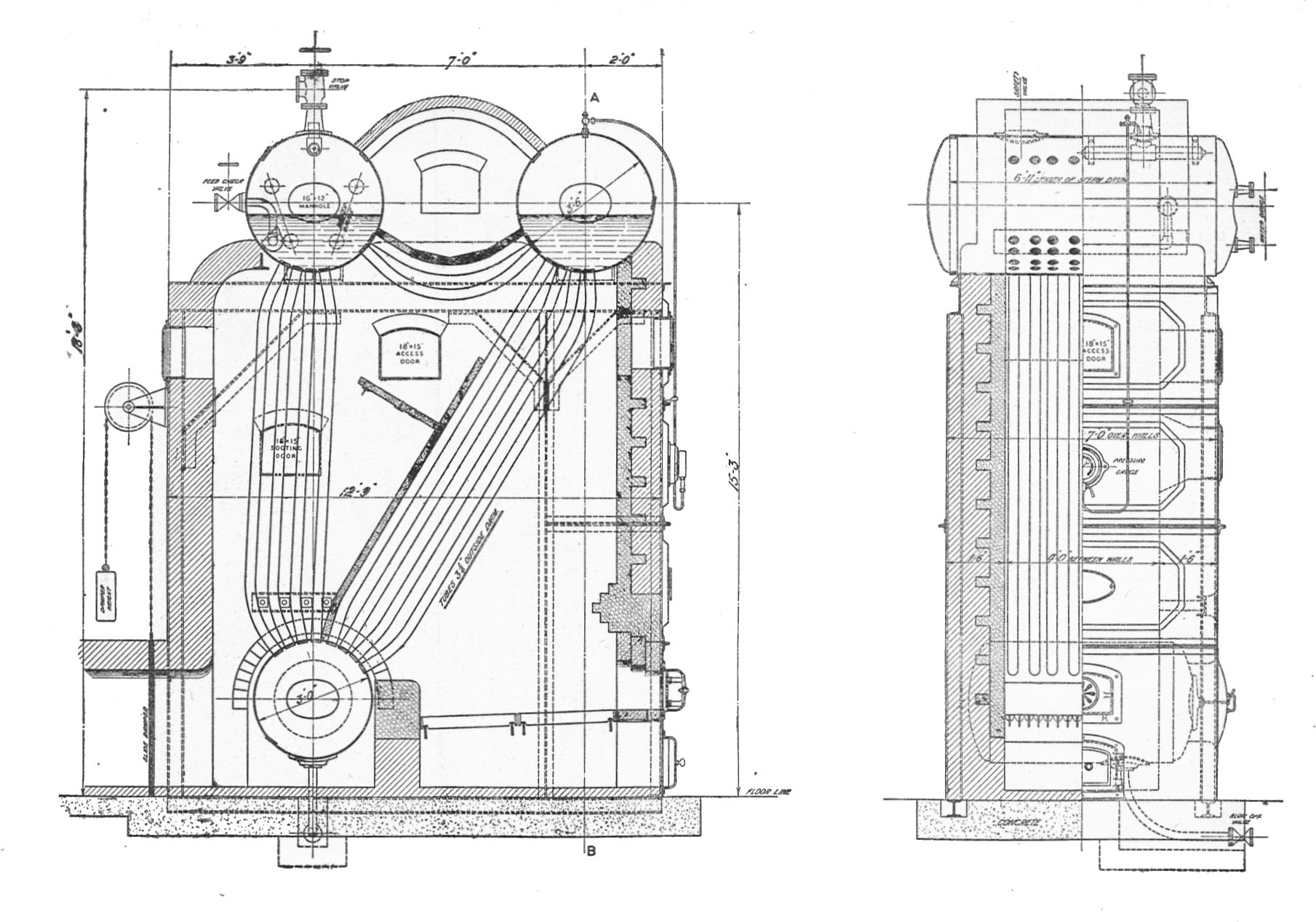
Small three-drum form, furnace to the right

Although broadly similar, variations with different numbers of tube banks are produced.

=== Three-drum or 'V' form ===
This simpler form is mainly used for low powers, or for heat-recovery from other furnace gases.

=== Four-drum or 'B' form ===
This is the main form of the boiler and gives efficient results with economical construction.

The marine version of the boiler is also of this form.

=== Five-drum or 'W' form ===
This is a more complex form, which uses an extra tube bank to gain efficiency. It is most popular for large installations, such as power stations, or where efficiency is most needed so as to gain the maximum heating from a limited fuel capacity.

== Marine Stirling boilers ==
Although generally a land-based boiler, the four-drum form was also used as a marine boiler, to power large ships.

The brick-built setting was replaced with a box-like steel housing, lined with firebrick. The water-tube diameter was reduced to between 2 and 2 1/2 inches (50.8 and 63.5 mm). To avoid problems with the water levels shifting as the ship rolls, the water drums were arranged crosswise to the hull and provided with internal baffles.
