= Water-tube boiler =

Type of furnace generating steam

Schematic diagram of a marine-type watertube boiler

A high pressure watertube boiler (also spelled water-tube and water tube) is a type of boiler in which water circulates in tubes heated externally by fire. Fuel is burned inside the furnace, creating hot gas which boils water in the steam-generating tubes. In smaller boilers, additional generating tubes are separate in the furnace, while larger utility boilers rely on the water-filled tubes that make up the walls of the furnace to generate steam.

The heated water/steam mixture then rises into the steam drum. Here, saturated steam is drawn off the top of the drum. In some services, the steam passes through tubes in the hot gas path (a superheater) to become superheated. Superheated steam is a dry gas and therefore is typically used to drive turbines, since water droplets can severely damage turbine blades.

Saturated water at the bottom of the steam drum returns to the lower drum via large-bore 'downcomer tubes', where it pre-heats the feedwater supply. (In large utility boilers, the feedwater is supplied to the steam drum and the downcomers supply water to the bottom of the waterwalls). To increase economy of the boiler, exhaust gases are also used to pre-heat combustion air blown into the burners, and to warm the feedwater supply in an economizer. Such watertube boilers in thermal power stations are also called steam generating units.

The older fire-tube boiler design, in which the water surrounds the heat source and gases from combustion pass through tubes within the water space, is typically a much weaker structure and is rarely used for pressures above 2.4 MPa (350 psi). A significant advantage of the watertube boiler is that there is less chance of a catastrophic failure: there is not a large volume of water in the boiler nor are there large mechanical elements subject to failure.

A water-tube boiler was patented by Blakey of England in 1766 and was made by Dallery of France in 1780.

== Applications ==
"The ability of watertube boilers to be designed without the use of excessively large and thick-walled pressure vessels makes these boilers particularly attractive in applications that require dry, high-pressure, high-energy steam, including steam turbine power generation".

Owing to their superb working properties, the use of watertube boilers is highly preferred in the following major areas:

- Variety of process applications in industries
- Chemical processing divisions
- Pulp and Paper manufacturing plants
- Refining units

Besides, they are frequently employed in power generation plants where large quantities of steam (ranging up to 500 kg/s (1,100 lb/s)) having high pressures i.e. approximately 16 MPa; 2,300 psi (160 bar) and high temperatures reaching up to 550 °C (1,022 °F) are generally required. For example, the Ivanpah solar-power station uses two Rentech Type-D watertube boilers for plant warmup, and when operating as a fossil-fueled power station.

=== Stationary ===
Modern boilers for power generation are almost entirely water-tube designs, owing to their ability to operate at higher pressures. Where process steam is required for heating or as a chemical component, then there is still a small niche for fire-tube boilers. One notable exception is in typical nuclear-power stations (Pressurized Water Reactors), where the steam generators are generally configured similar to firetube boiler designs. In these applications the hot gas path through the "Firetubes" actually carries the very hot/high pressure primary coolant from the reactor, and steam is generated on the external surface of the tubes.

=== Marine ===
Their ability to work at higher pressures has led to marine boilers being almost entirely watertube. This change began around 1900, and traced the adoption of turbines for propulsion rather than reciprocating (i.e. piston) engines – although watertube boilers were also used with reciprocating engines, and firetube boilers were also used in many marine turbine applications.

=== Railway ===
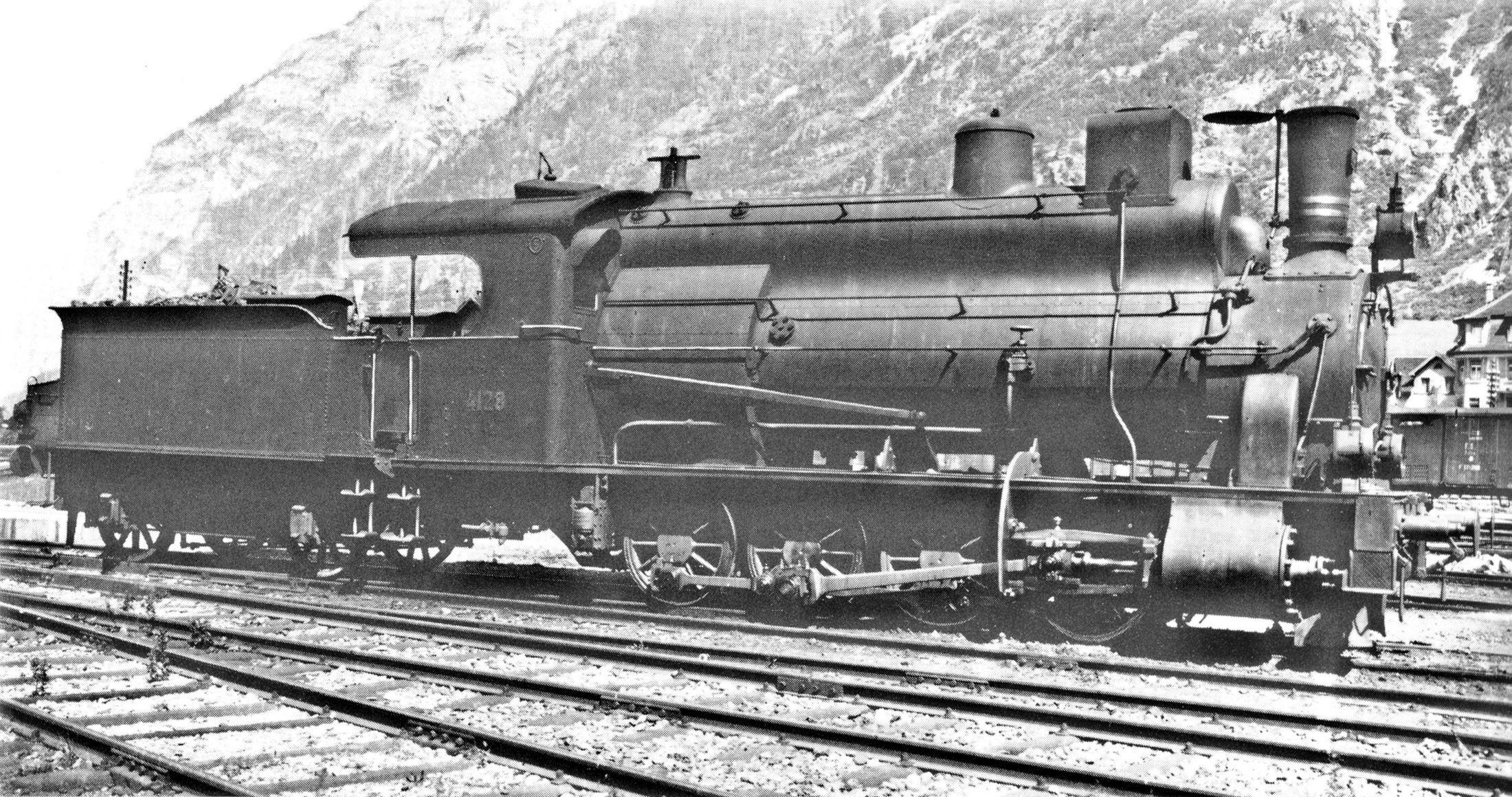
Swiss locomotive rebuilt with a Brotan boiler, in 1907

There has been no significant adoption of water-tube boilers for railway locomotives. A handful of experimental designs were produced, but none of them were successful or led to their widespread use. Most water-tube railway locomotives, especially in Europe, used the Schmidt system. Most were compounds, and a few uniflows. The Norfolk and Western Railway's Jawn Henry was an exception, because it used a steam turbine combined with an electric transmission.

- LMS 6399 Fury

Rebuilt completely after a fatal accident

- LNER 10000 "Hush hush"

Using a Yarrow boiler, rather than Schmidt. Not successful and re-boilered with a conventional boiler.

==== Hybrids ====
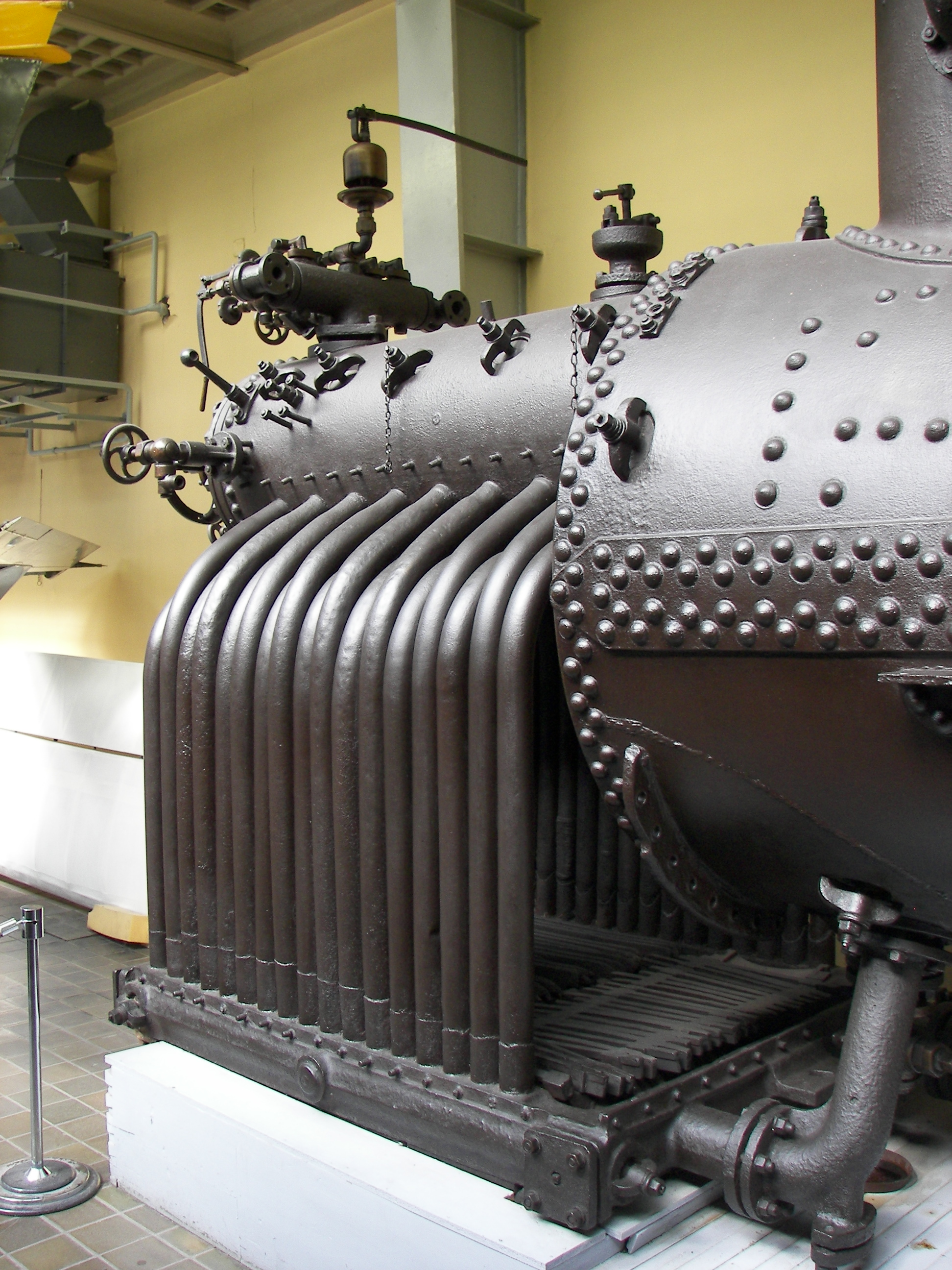
Brotan boiler

A slightly more successful adoption was the use of hybrid water-tube/fire-tube systems. As the hottest part of a locomotive boiler is the firebox, it was an effective design to use water-tubes here and a conventional fire-tube boiler as an economiser (i.e. pre-heater) in the usual position. One famous example of this was the USA Baldwin 4-10-2 No. 60000, built in 1926. Built as a compound with a boiler pressure of 2,400 kilopascals (350 psi) it successfully covered over 160,000 kilometres (100,000 mi) in service. After a year however, it became clear that any improvements were overwhelmed by the extra costs, and it was retired as a museum display at the Franklin Institute in Philadelphia, Pennsylvania. A series of twelve experimental locomotives were constructed at the Baltimore and Ohio Railroad's Mt. Clare shops under the supervision of George H. Emerson, but none of them were replicated in any numbers.

The only water-tube locomotive boiler used in any large numbers was the Brotan boiler, invented by Johann Brotan in Austria in 1902 and found sparsely throughout Europe, although Hungary had around 1,000 in service. Like the Baldwin 60000, it combined a water-tube firebox with a fire-tube barrel. The Brotan's original characteristic was a long steam drum running above the main barrel, resembling a Flaman boiler in appearance.

=== Road ===
While traction engines were usually built with locomotive boiler as its frame, other types of steam road vehicles such as lorries and cars used a wide range of different boiler types. Road transport pioneers Goldsworthy Gurney and Walter Hancock both used water-tube boilers in their steam carriages around 1830.

Most undertype wagons used water-tube boilers. Many manufacturers used variants of the vertical cross-tube boiler, including Atkinson, Clayton, Garrett and Sentinel. Other types include the Clarkson 'thimble tube' and the Foden O-type wagon's pistol-shaped boiler.

Steam fire-engine makers such as Merryweather usually used water-tube boilers for their rapid steam-raising capacity. Many steam cars used water-tube boilers, and the Bolsover Express company even made a water-tube replacement for the Stanley Steamer fire-tube boiler.

== Design variations ==
=== D-type boiler ===
The 'D-type' is the most common type of small- to medium-sized boilers, similar to the one shown in the schematic diagram. It is used in both stationary and marine applications. It consists of a large steam drum vertically connected to a smaller water drum (a.k.a. "mud drum") via multiple steam-generating tubes. These drums and tubes as well as the oil-fired burner are enclosed by water-walls - additional water-filled tubes spaced close together so as to prevent gas flow between them. These water wall tubes are connected to both the steam and water drums, so that they act as a combination of preheaters and downcomers as well as decreasing heat loss to the boiler shell.

=== M-type boilers ===
The M-type boilers were used in many US World War II warships including hundreds of Fletcher-class destroyers. Three sets of tubes form the shape of an M, and create a separately fired superheater that allows better superheat temperature control. In addition to the mud drum shown on a D-type boiler, an M-type has a water-screen header and a waterwall header at the bottom of the two additional rows of vertical tubes and downcomers.

=== Low water content ===
The low water content boiler has a lower and upper header connected by watertubes that are directly impinged upon from the burner. This is a "furnace-less" boiler that can generate steam and react quickly to changes in load.

=== Babcock & Wilcox boiler ===
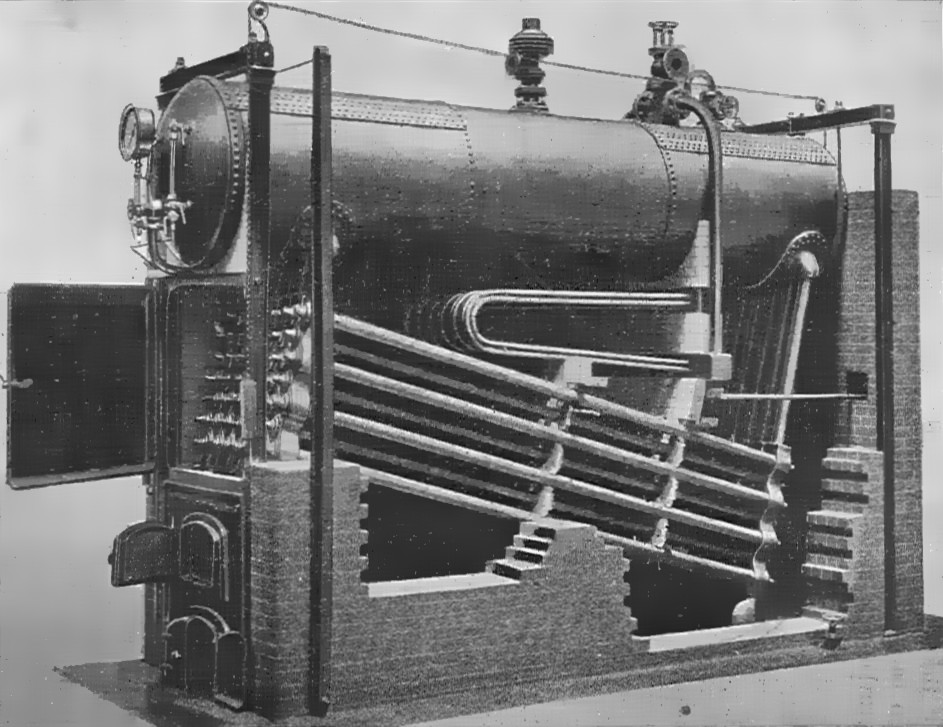
Babcock & Wilcox boiler

Designed by the American firm of Babcock & Wilcox, this type has a single drum, with feedwater drawn from the bottom of the drum into a header that supplies inclined water-tubes. The watertubes supply steam back into the top of the drum. Furnaces are located below the tubes and drum.

This type of boiler was used by the Royal Navy's Leander-class frigates and in United States Navy New Orleans-class cruisers.

=== Stirling boiler ===
The Stirling boiler has near-vertical, almost-straight watertubes that zig-zag between a number of steam and water drums. Usually there are three banks of tubes in a "four drum" layout, but certain applications use variations designed with a different number of drums and banks. They are mainly used as stationary boilers, owing to their large size, although the large grate area does also encourage their ability to burn a wide range of fuels. Originally coal-fired in power stations, they also became widespread in industries that produced combustible waste and required process steam. Paper pulp mills could burn waste bark, sugar refineries their bagasse waste. It is a horizontal drum type of boiler.

=== Yarrow ===
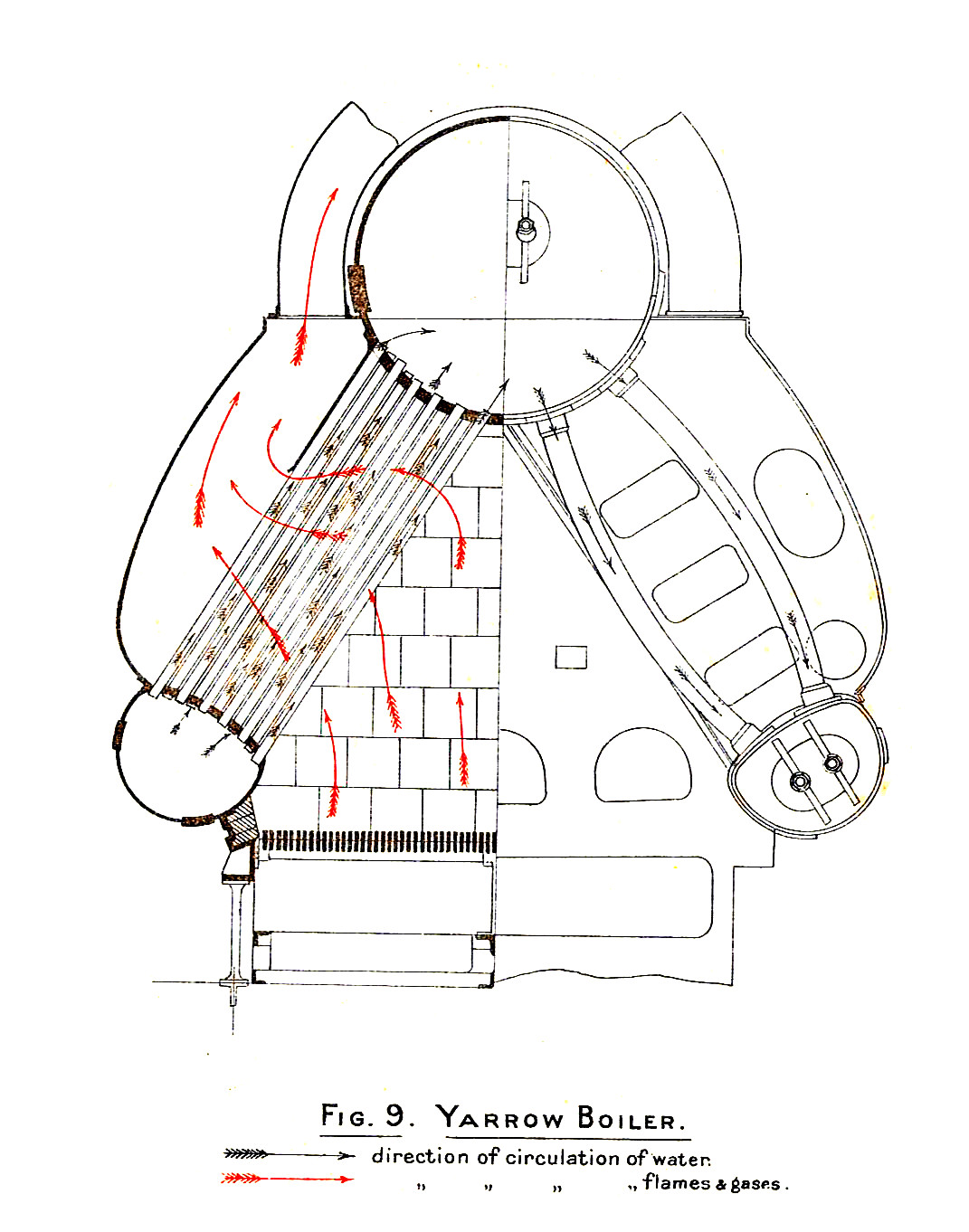
End-view of a Yarrow boiler

Named after its designers, the then Poplar-based Yarrow Shipbuilders, this type of three-drum boiler has three drums in a delta formation connected by watertubes. The drums are linked by straight watertubes, allowing easy tube-cleaning. This does, however, mean that the tubes enter the drums at varying angles, a more difficult joint to caulk. Outside the firebox, a pair of cold-leg pipes between each drum act as downcomers.

Due to its three drums, the Yarrow boiler has a greater water capacity. Hence, this type is usually used in older marine boiler applications. Its compact size made it attractive for use in transportable power generation units during World War II. In order to make it transportable, the boiler and its auxiliary equipment (fuel oil heating, pumping units, fans etc.), turbines, and condensers were mounted on wagons to be transported by rail.

=== White-Forster ===
The White-Forster type is similar to the Yarrow, but with tubes that are gradually curved. This makes their entry into the drums perpendicular, thus simpler to make a reliable seal.

=== Thornycroft ===
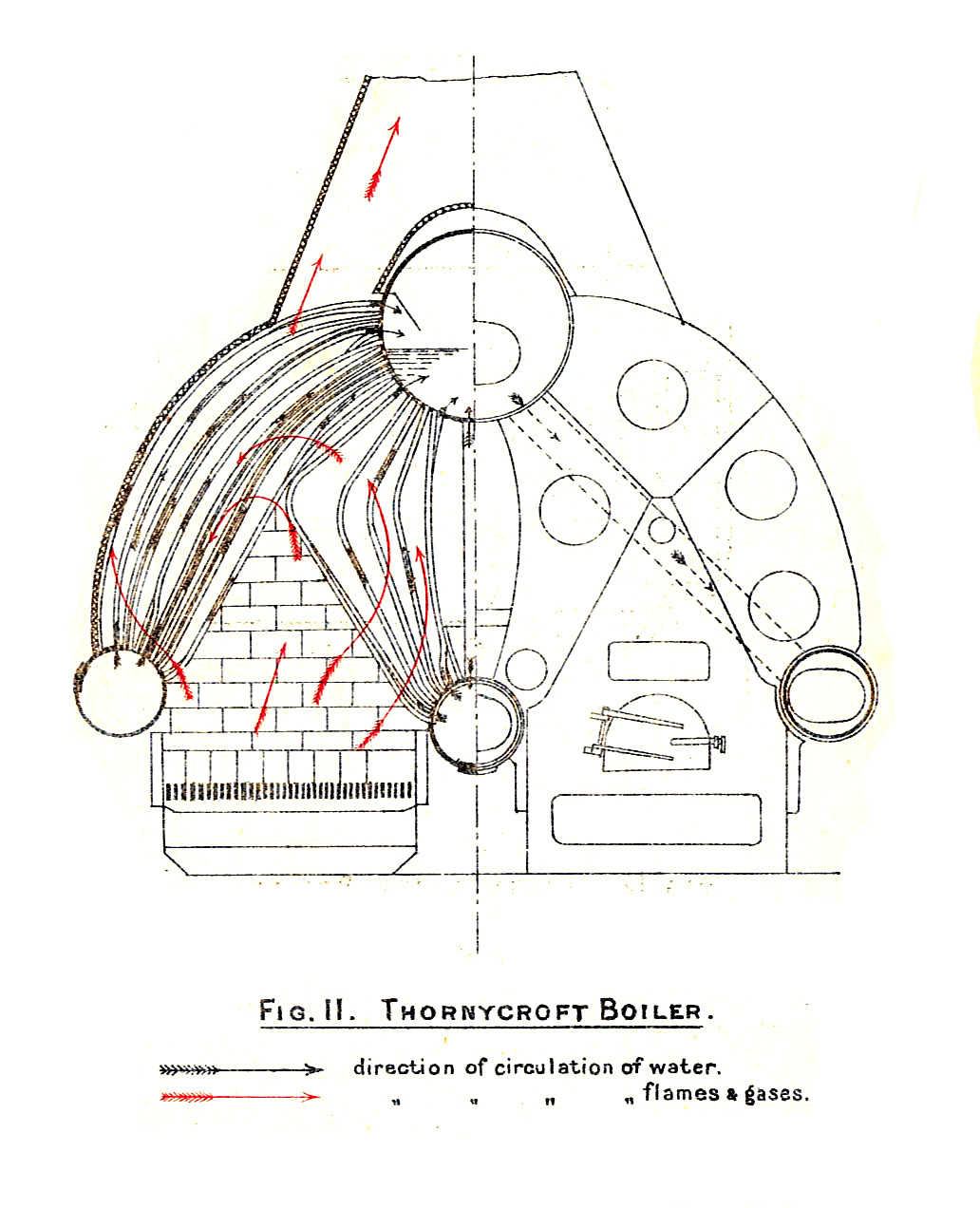
End view of a Thornycroft boiler

Designed by the shipbuilder John I. Thornycroft & Company, the Thornycroft type features a single steam drum with two sets of watertubes either side of the furnace. These tubes, especially the central set, have sharp curves. Apart from obvious difficulties in cleaning them, this may also give rise to bending forces as the tubes warm up, tending to pull them loose from the tubeplate and creating a leak. There are two furnaces, venting into a common exhaust, giving the boiler a wide base tapering profile.

=== Forced circulation boiler ===
In a forced circulation boiler, a pump is added to speed up the flow of water through the tubes.

=== Other types ===
- O-type boiler
- A-type boiler
- Flex-tube boiler
- M-type control superheater

== See also ==
- Clarkson thimble tube boiler
- Corner tube boiler
- Internally rifled boiler tubes (also known as serve tubes)
- Three-drum boiler
