= Görres =

Görres is the name of

- Joseph Görres (1776–1848), German Catholic writer
- Guido Görres (1805–1852), German Catholic historian, publicist and poet
- Ida Friederike Görres (1901–1971), Czech-Austrian writer
- Oscar Görres (born 1986), also known as OzGo, Swedish record producer, songwriter, and musician
- Sascha Görres (born 1980), German footballer

== See also ==
- Görres Society, German learned society
