= Friedrich Heinrich Vering =

Friedrich Heinrich Vering (b. at Liesborn in Westphalia, 9 March 1833; d. at Prague, 30 March 1896) was a German canon lawyer, a defender of the Catholic Church against the State.

== Life ==
After completing his course at the gymnasium of Paderborn in 1850, he studied law at the Universities of Bonn and Heidelberg, and graduated at the latter university in 1856. He was admitted there as privatdocent of Roman and canon law in 1857, and became professor extraordinary in 1862. He held this position until 1875 when he accepted the chair of canon law at the newly erected university of Czernowitz in Bukowina, Austria.

In 1879 he became professor of canon law at the German University of Prague, holding this position till his death.

== Works ==
His best known work is his comprehensive text-book on canon law: "Lehrbuch des katholischen, orientalischen und protestantischen Kirchenrechts" (Freiburg, 1876; 3rd ed., ibid., 1893). His two other major works are:

- "Geschichte und Institutionen des römischen Privatrechts" (Mainz, 1865, 5th ed., entitled: "Gesch. und Pandekten d. röm. und heutigen gemeinen Privatr.", Mainz, 1887); and *"Römisches Erbrecht in historischer und dogmatischer Entwickelung" (Heidelberg, 1861).

He also wrote the eighth volume of George Phillips's Kirchenrecht (Mainz, 1889) and numerous smaller juridical treatises. From 1860 he was, with Moy de Sons, joint editor, and from 182, sole editor, of "Archiv für katholisches Kirchenrecht" (Mainz).
