= Bad Lippspringe =

- Town
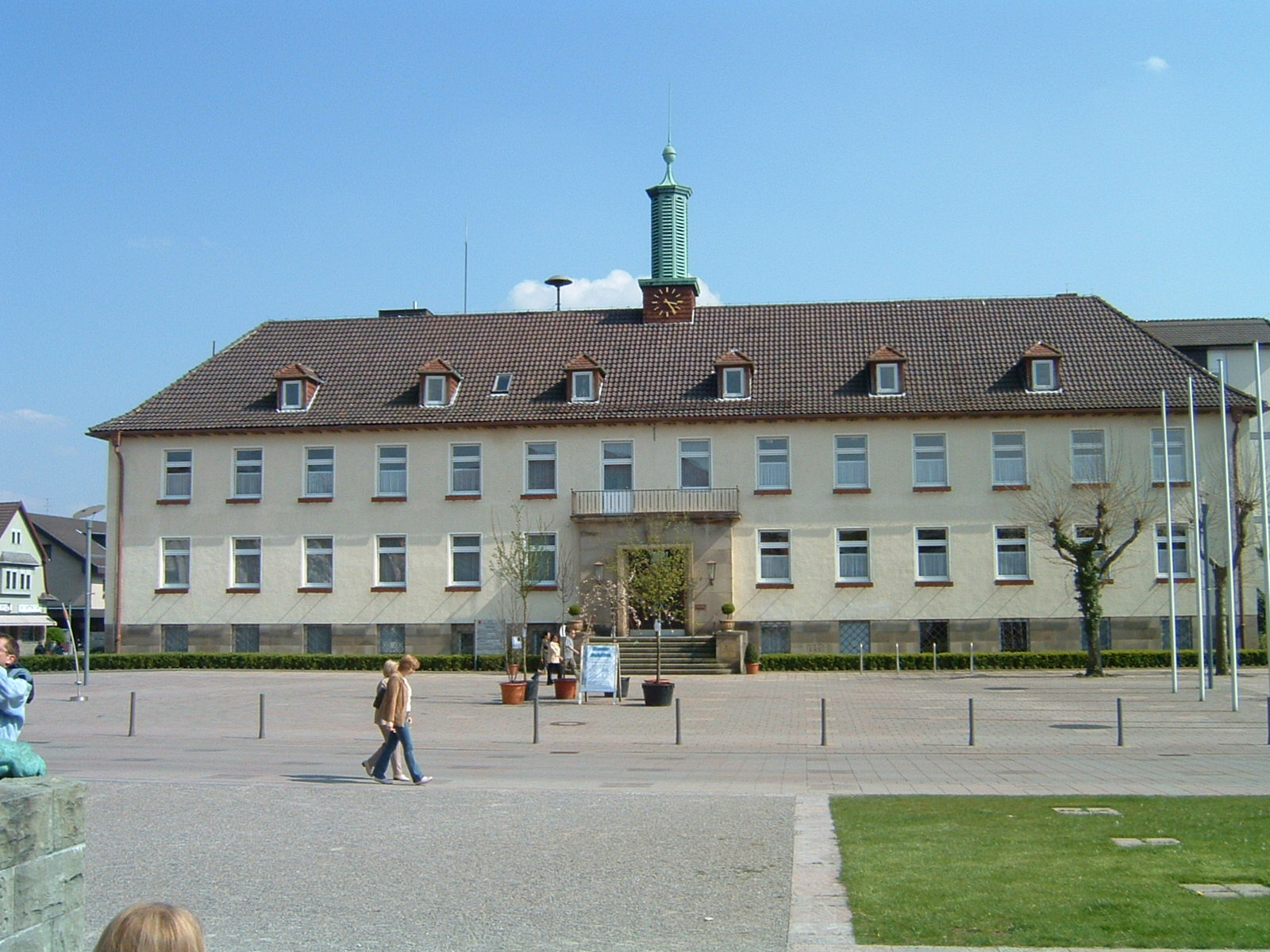
- Town hall of Bad Lippspringe

- Coat of arms

- Location of Bad Lippspringe within Paderborn district
- Interactive map of Bad Lippspringe
- Location within Germany Location within North Rhine-Westphalia
- Coordinates: 51°47′00″N 8°49′00″E
- Country: Germany
- State: North Rhine-Westphalia
- Admin. region: Detmold
- District: Paderborn

Government
  - Mayor (2025–30): Ulrich Lange (CDU)

Area
  - Total: 51.01 km^{2} (19.70 sq mi)
- Elevation: 140 m (460 ft)

Population (2025-12-31)
  - Total: 17,280
  - Density: 338.8/km^{2} (877.4/sq mi)
- Time zone: UTC+01:00 (CET)
  - Summer (DST): UTC+02:00 (CEST)
- Postal codes: 33175
- Dialling codes: 05252
- Vehicle registration: PB
- Website: www.bad-lippspringe.de

Bad Lippspringe (German: [baːt lɪpˈʃpʁɪŋə]) is a town in the district of Paderborn, in North Rhine-Westphalia, Germany.

== Geography ==
Bad Lippspringe is situated on the western slope of the Teutoburger Wald, approximately 10 km (6.2 miles) north-east of Paderborn. The river Lippe has its source in Bad Lippspringe, and the town is noted for its powerful river springs, many hospitals and its beautiful state gardening show in 2017. Bad Lippspringe has been twinned with Newbridge, County Kildare (Irish: An Droichead Nua), Ireland since 2008.

== Climate ==
Climate data for Bad Lippspringe (1991–2020 normals)
Month	Jan	Feb	Mar	Apr	May	Jun	Jul	Aug	Sep	Oct	Nov	Dec	Year
Mean daily maximum °C (°F)	4.6 (40.3)	5.5 (41.9)	9.4 (48.9)	14.3 (57.7)	18.2 (64.8)	21.3 (70.3)	23.6 (74.5)	23.3 (73.9)	19.0 (66.2)	13.9 (57.0)	8.7 (47.7)	5.4 (41.7)	13.9 (57.0)
Daily mean °C (°F)	2.1 (35.8)	2.5 (36.5)	5.4 (41.7)	9.4 (48.9)	13.2 (55.8)	16.2 (61.2)	18.2 (64.8)	18.1 (64.6)	14.3 (57.7)	10.2 (50.4)	6.0 (42.8)	3.0 (37.4)	9.9 (49.8)
Mean daily minimum °C (°F)	−0.6 (30.9)	−0.6 (30.9)	1.5 (34.7)	4.2 (39.6)	7.8 (46.0)	10.7 (51.3)	13.1 (55.6)	13.1 (55.6)	10.0 (50.0)	6.7 (44.1)	3.3 (37.9)	0.5 (32.9)	5.8 (42.4)
Average precipitation mm (inches)	87.6 (3.45)	64.0 (2.52)	64.8 (2.55)	53.0 (2.09)	64.4 (2.54)	70.8 (2.79)	90.2 (3.55)	85.7 (3.37)	77.0 (3.03)	76.6 (3.02)	79.6 (3.13)	88.6 (3.49)	902.5 (35.53)
Average precipitation days (≥ 1.0 mm)	19.0	16.8	16.5	13.6	14.7	15.5	15.9	15.7	15.1	16.8	18.3	20.4	198.4
Average snowy days (≥ 1.0 cm)	6.0	6.7	2.0	0.1	0	0	0	0	0	0	1.1	4.2	20.1
Average relative humidity (%)	83.9	81.2	76.6	70.2	70.7	72.1	71.7	72.3	78.0	81.9	85.1	85.5	77.4
Mean monthly sunshine hours	52.3	69.4	117.4	166.5	192.5	191.5	198.2	187.4	141.3	102.6	51.3	41.6	1,512.7
Source: World Meteorological Organization

== History ==
- Lippspringe is mentioned in chronicles as early as the 9th century, and here in the 13th century the order of the Templars established a stronghold. It received civic rights about 1400.
- Friedrich Wilhelm Weber was born here in 1817.
- During the 19th century, the Arminius spring and the Liborius spring, with saline waters of a temperature of 21 °C (70 °F), were used both for bathing and drinking in cases of tuberculosis.
- In 1915 the town's shooting range was converted into a lazaret to treat prisoners from Senne camp (Sennelager) 9 km to the west.

== Population ==
Historical population

Year	Pop.	±% p.a.
1965	9,135	—
1970	9,820	+1.46%
1975	10,956	+2.21%
1980	11,874	+1.62%
1985	12,113	+0.40%
1990	12,860	+1.20%
1995	14,566	+2.52%

Year	Pop.	±% p.a.
2000	14,885	+0.43%
2005	15,292	+0.54%
2010	15,200	−0.12%
2015	15,572	+0.48%
2020	16,408	+1.05%
2025	17,280	+1.04%

Source: Landesdatabank Nordrhein-Westfalen

== Politics ==
The current mayor is Ulrich Lange of the CDU who has been serving as mayor since 2020. In the 2025 elections he was reelected with 65,4 % of the vote.

=== City council ===
After the 2025 local elections, the Bad Lippspringe city council is composed as follows:

Party	Votes	%	+/-	Seats	+/-
Christian Democratic Union (CDU)	2,864	42.2	▲1.0	16	▲1
Free Voters' Association Bad Lippspringe (FWG)	1,167	17.2	▼3.5	7	▼1
Alternative for Germany (AfD)	968	14.3	▲9.0	5	▲5
Social Democratic Party (SPD)	688	10.1	▼8.9	4	▼2
Alliance 90/The Greens (Grüne)	661	9.7	▼8.5	4	▼1
Free Democratic Party (FDP)	244	3.6	▼1.6	1	▼1
Association Social Bad Lippspringe (BSB)	199	2.9	New	1	New
Valid votes	6,791	99.0			
Invalid votes	72	1.0			
Total	6,863	100.0		38	±0
Electorate/voter turnout	13,150	52.2			
Source: City of Bad Lippspringe

== Sports ==
The local football team is BV Bad Lippspringe, which Antonio Di Salvo started his career with, after being born nearby.

Bad Lippspringe was home to RAPA (Rhine Army Parachute Association), a British Army Parachute and Skydiving Dropzone. It was formed in 1964 and later closed in 2018 after 54 years.

== Notable people ==
- Friedrich Wilhelm Weber (1813–1894), German epic poet, fountain doctor in Lippspringe
- Alexander Hermann, Count of Wartensleben (1650–1734), Prussian field marshal
- Friedrich Kühn (1907–1979), German politician of the CDU, who was born in Bad Lippspringe
- Wilhelm Wegener (1911–2004), legal historian and genealogist
- Erich Fuchs (1921–2008), German internist and allergist, many years top and chief physician at the Asthma Clinic Allergy Research Institute in Bad Lippspringe
- Sabine Lösing (born 1955), member of the European Parliament, grew up in Bad Lippspringe
- Markus Gellhaus (born 1970), German football coach, played football at BV Bad Lippspringe
- Antonio Di Salvo (born 1979), Italian footballer, played football at BV Bad Lippspringe

== Gallery ==
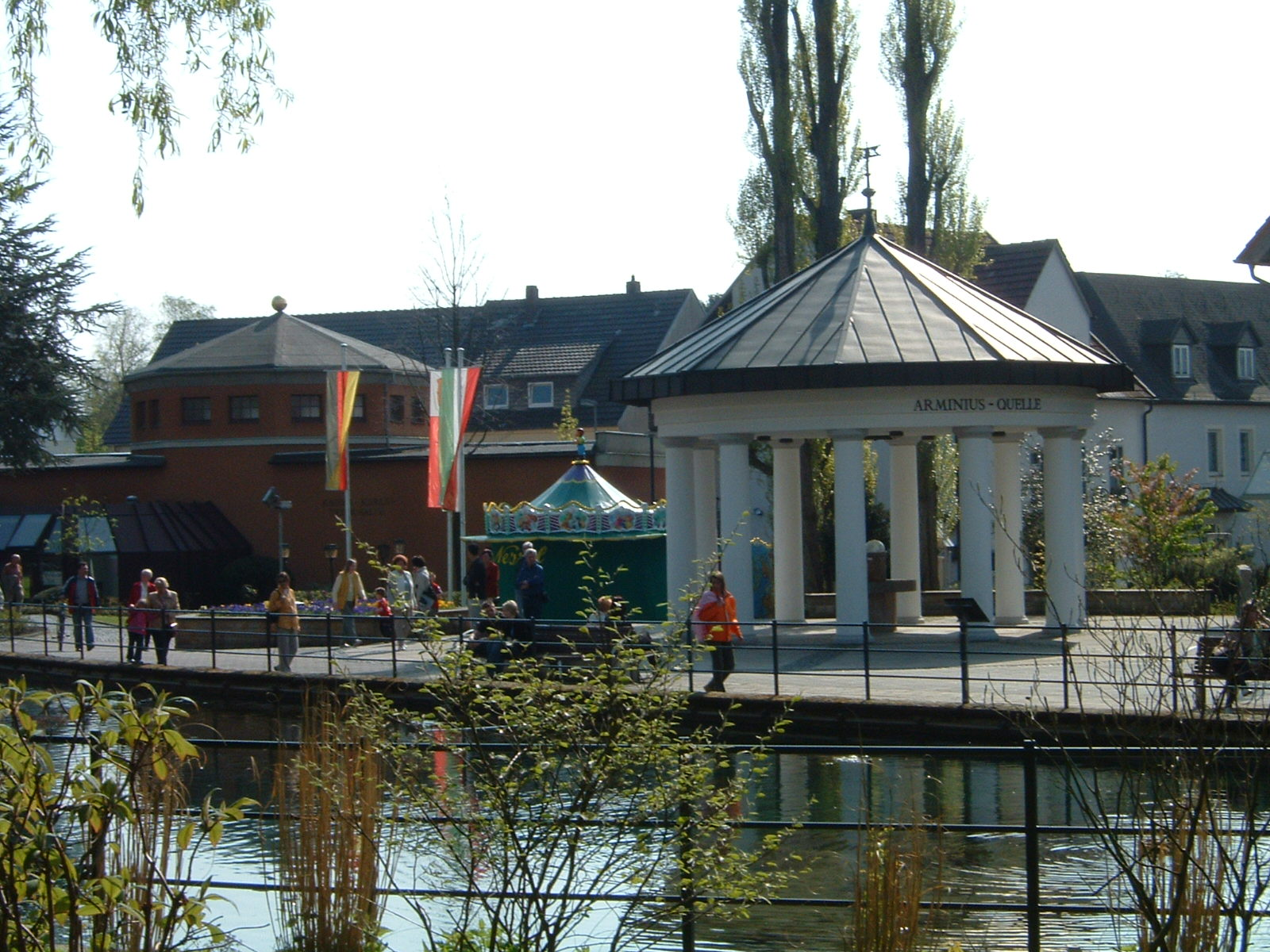
Arminiusquelle with Lippequelle in the foreground

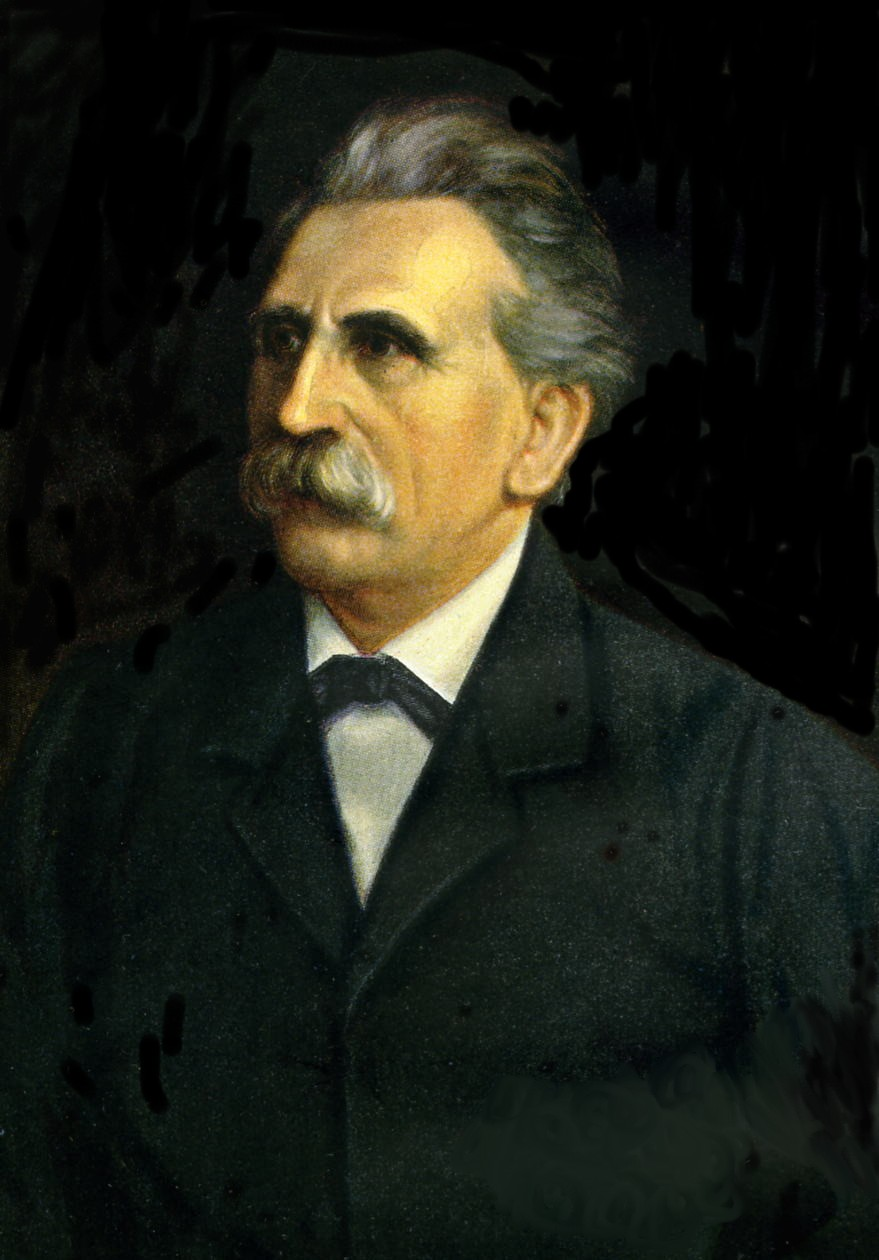
Friedrich Wilhelm Weber
