= Willi Sandforth =

German artist (1922–2017)

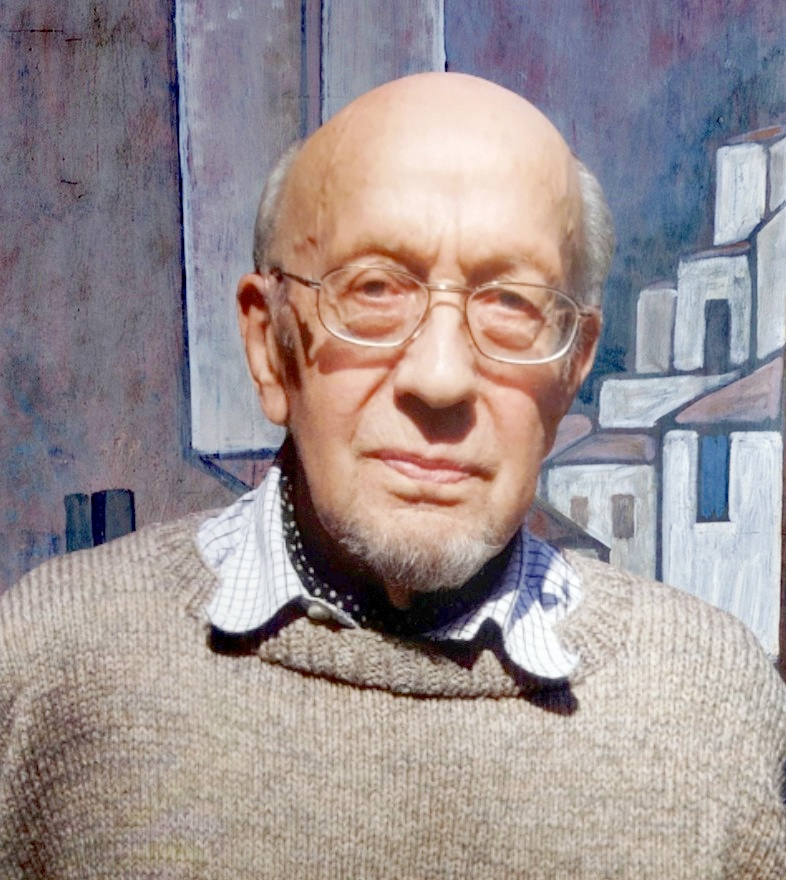
Willi Sandforth in front of painting, 2012

Willi Sandforth (10 January 1922 – 7 January 2017) was a German painter and graphic artist and a late representative of Constructivism.

== Life ==
=== Early years (1922 to 1947) ===
Willi Sandforth was born 10 January 1922 in Ahlen, Germany, the youngest of five children. His father was a foreman in an enamelling factory and his mother a trained housekeeper. The early childhood impressions of the industrial buildings in Ahlen shaped the artist's vision just as much as his first encounters with contemporary art. Thus, a collector's picture from a cigarette packet showing Carlo Carrà's Pine Tree by the Sea ended up in the hands of the adolescent, who was deeply impressed by the clarity and austerity of the picture's composition.

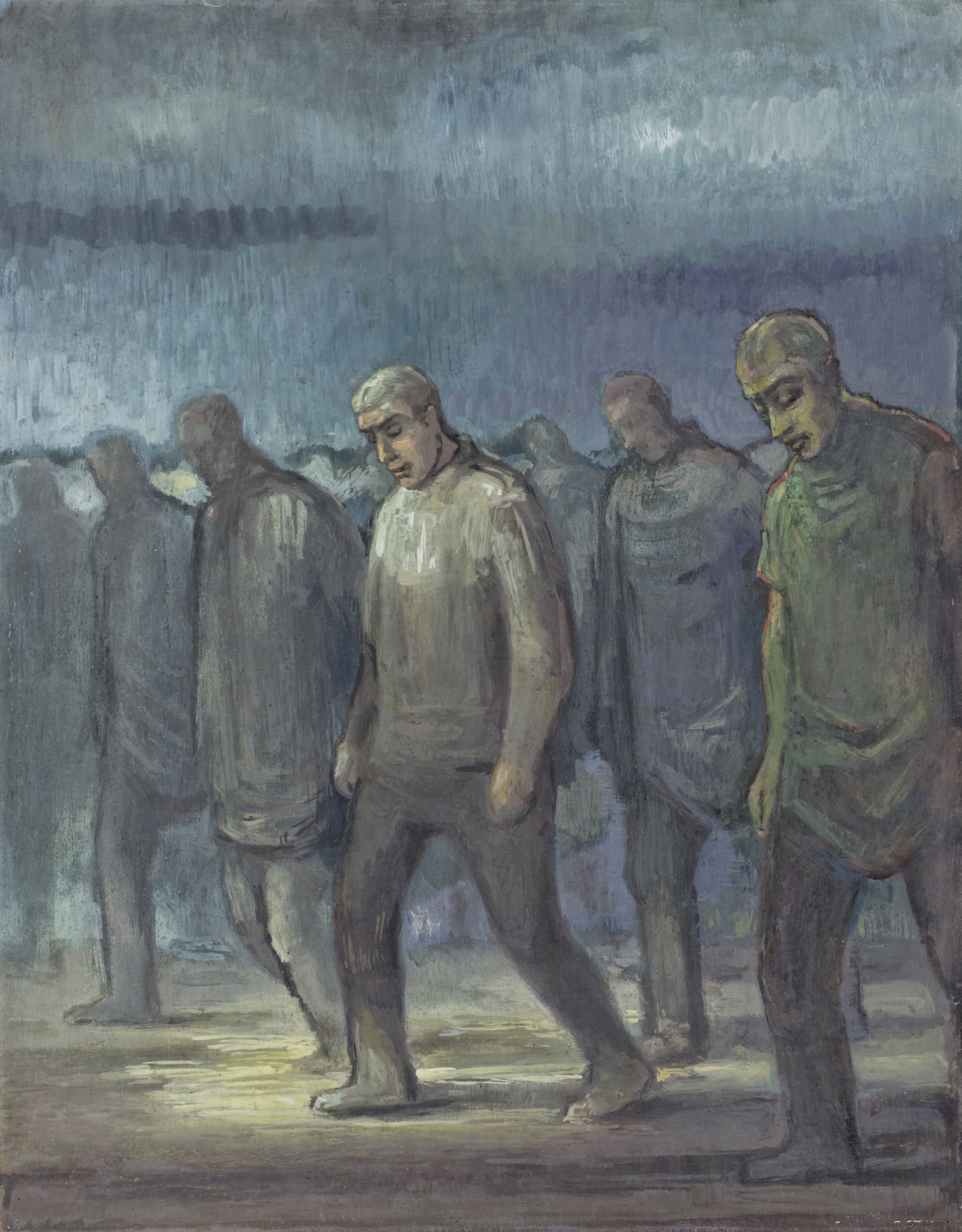
The End, Tryptichon II, 1946

Already as a teenager, Sandforth created portraits of his parents in the manner of the old masters without having enjoyed any artistic training until then. In 1938 he made a plaster bust as a sculptural self-portrait, of which only one photograph exists. After finishing primary school, he completed an apprenticeship as a decorator at his parents' request. In 1939 he attended a class for commercial art at the college of arts in Bielefeld until he was called up for military service. At the end of the war he was taken prisoner in France, where he experienced not only the typical privations but also impressions of the southern French landscape and the Strasbourg Cathedral. After a visit to the camp by control functionaries, he was appointed camp supervisor for art, which allowed him to draw and paint watercolours for a time. In April 1946, he was able to return to his parental home, where he first recorded impressions of the horrors of war and captivity in a depressing triptych, before he was able to turn to classical painting themes "with conscious colourfulness".

=== Training and first years as a freelance artist: (Kassel and Munich 1947–1954) ===
When the college of fine arts in Kassel resumed classes in autumn 1947, Sandforth enrolled to study with Kay Heinrich Nebel. He produced nature studies, figurative compositions, circus paintings and street scenes. When Nebel fell ill in the second semester, Sandforth considered continuing his studies at the Munich Art Academy with Xaver Fuhr. However, this did not happen after he was offered a traineeship with Hermann Lohe in the restoration department of the Bavarian State Painting Collections. This job took up so much of his time that he was unable to work as a freelance artist alongside it, as he had expected. So in 1951 he left the galleries and at the same time ended his training, looking forward to an uncertain future as a freelance painter full of hope.

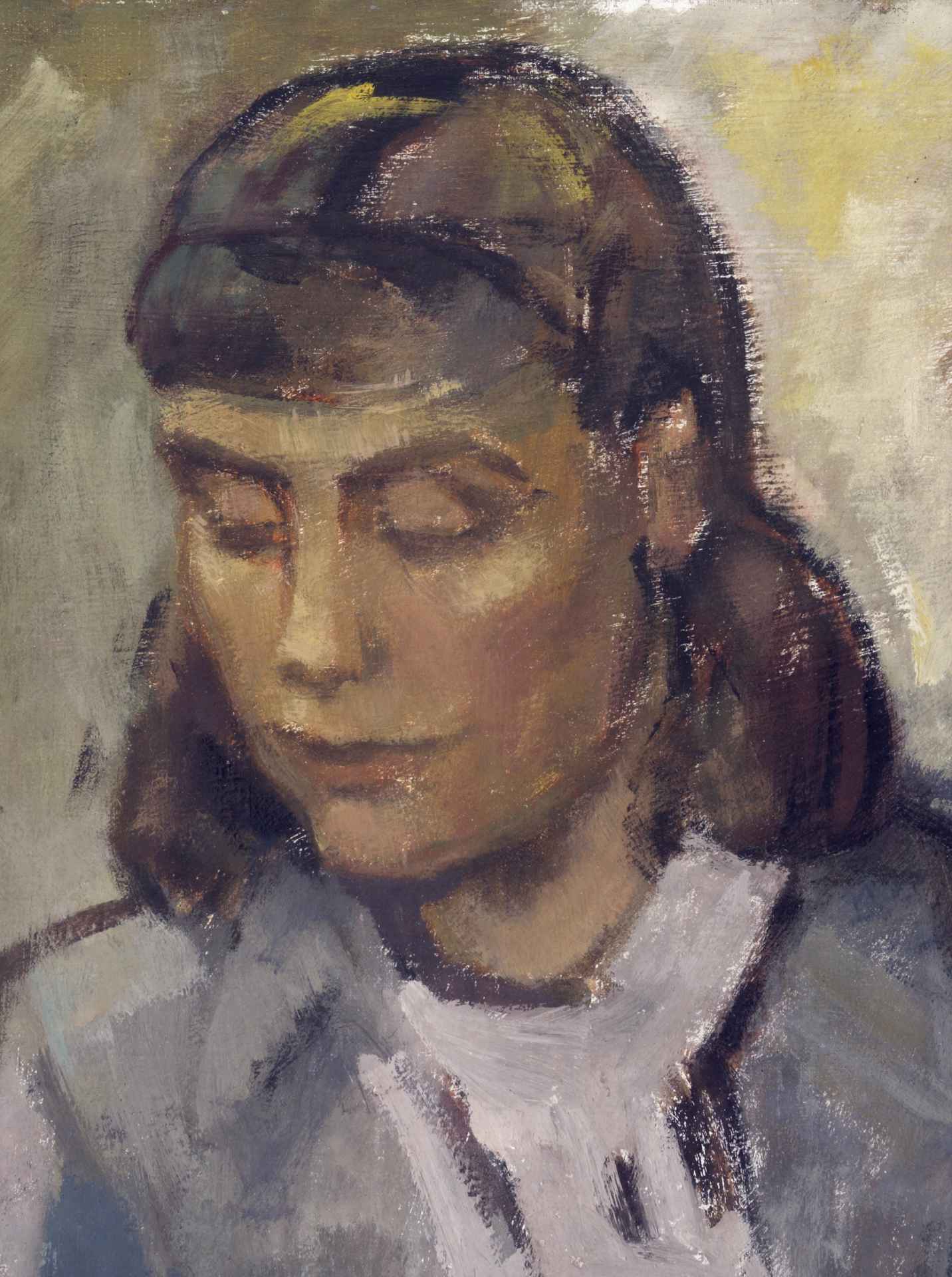
Lotte, early portrait, 1947

Sandforth had married in 1951 his fellow student Charlotte (Lotte), of whom he had already painted a first portrait in 1947. She supported him with her work as a graphic designer and layout artist in demand in Munich, and Sandforth appreciated and admired her work. The young couple with their son Hans Georg found friends among artists and journalists. Sandforth drew the destroyed and the preserved Munich and its surroundings and created his painting Big city children. In 1951 he joined the Artists' Cooperative founded by Hannes König, which, among other things, organised exhibitions to which Sandforth contributed works. Sandforth participated in the Great German Art Exhibition from 1952 until the 1970s. Nevertheless, it was arduous to assert himself as a young freelance painter against those already established.

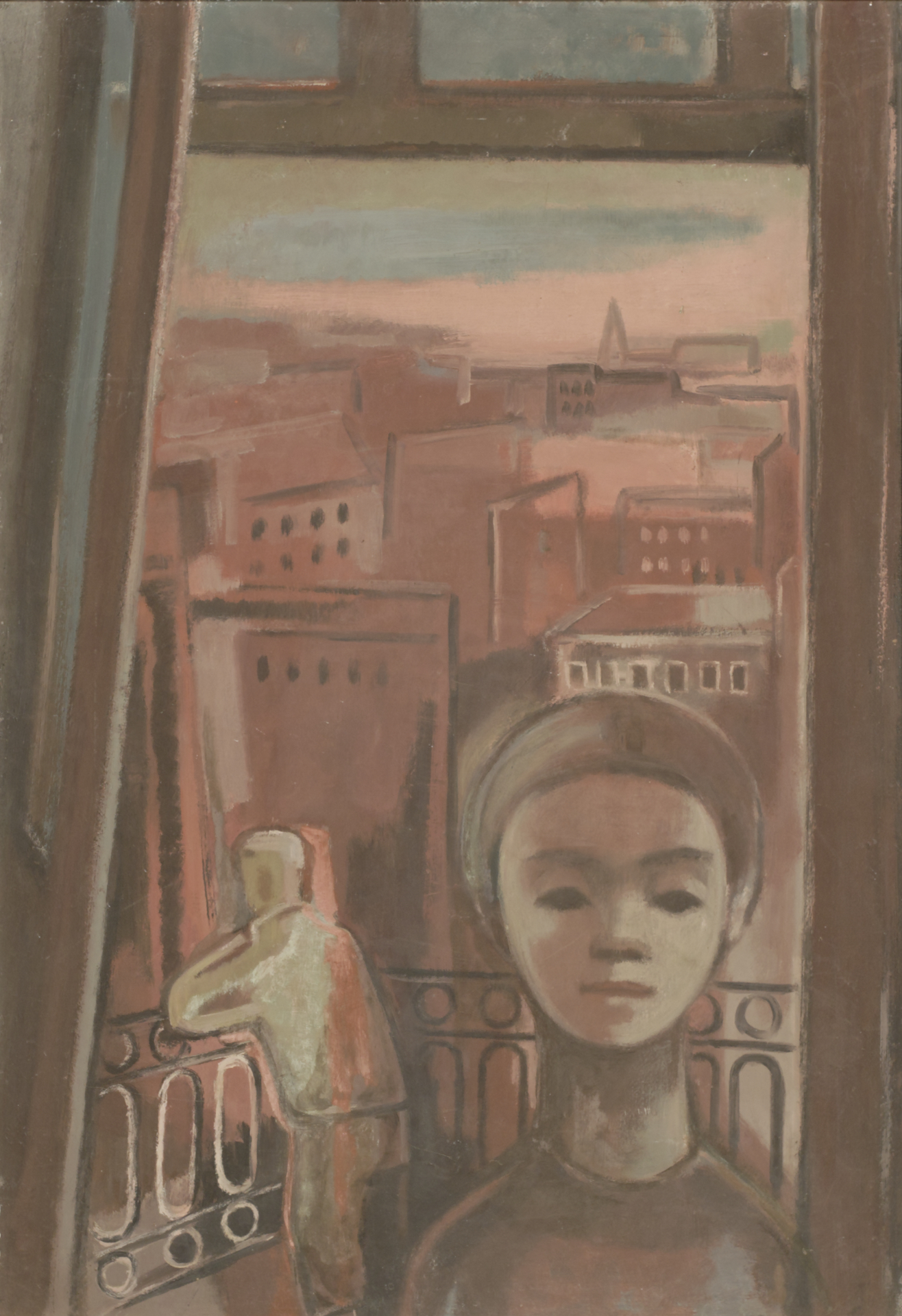
Big City Children, 1952

In 1953 Sandforth travelled to the Jutland North Sea coast via Greetsiel and Sylt. He exhibited the sketches and paintings he had brought with him, the latter partly created in the studio on the basis of the sketches, at the Art Pavilion Munich in 1954, and the press reported extensively. In order to get to know the works of other painters, Sandforth travelled as far as Naples, where he visited the frescoes of Hans von Marées, which are counted among the major works of 19th-century German painting. Further study trips took him to Lake Garda, Holland and the Lofoten Islands.

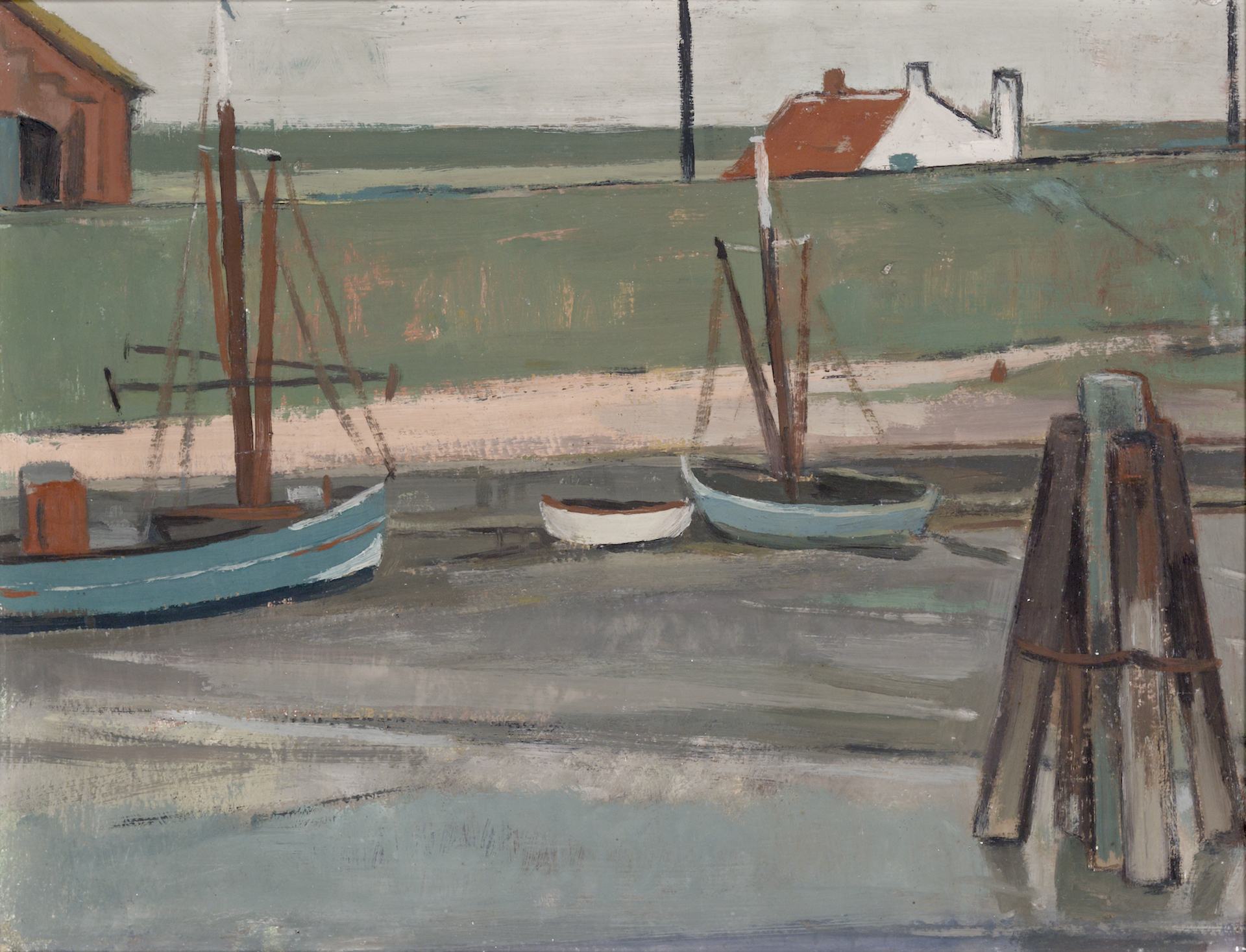
Greetsiel, low tide in the harbour, 1952

When the birth of their second child was imminent in autumn 1954, the couple decided to return to Westphalia. They found a flat in Gütersloh, East Westphalia, where Sandforth's parents-in-law lived in their own house. Before that, Sandforth travelled to Niendorf (Timmendorfer Strand) to paint with his colleague Josef Seidl-Seitz, who was 14 years his senior. Seidl-Seitz was known through various exhibitions and was, among other things, a juror of the "Great Art Exhibition". Together with him and some artists from Munich, the Art Association in Beckum, Germany, organised an exhibition in the district of Warendorf following the study trip. The daily newspaper Westfälische Rundschau of 21 December 1954 wrote: "Willi Sandforth ... also exhibited five works, which show a great ability for powerful composition and captivate the viewer with their noble colouring, which is fresh and lively despite all its delicacy. ... His landscape paintings are filled with a consistent striving for simple size and line and a fine harmony for colour."

In 1957, Willi Sandforth and his family moved into his parents-in-law's house, where they lived until the end of their lives. Sandforth built a studio next to the house where he could work at any time, even at night.

=== Creative periods after his return to Westphalia ===
==== 1954 to 1968 ====
In rural East Westphalia, Sandforth had a hard time following up on his first successes in Munich, as here in the provinces he lacked cultural institutions, museums and, above all, exchanges with colleagues. In order to secure a livelihood for his family in addition to the salary of his wife, who had taken up a job as an art teacher, he accepted numerous commissions for the design of reliefs, mosaics, murals and concrete stained glass windows in public spaces until the end of the 1960s. Nonetheless, the craftsmanship suited him and he gained a feeling for the surface, which was not without influence on his later large-format paintings. An albeit not entirely new theme for him was the industrial landscape. Around 1962, he created his work Winding Towers after studying, among others, Fernand Léger and his painting Les Constructeurs. Towards the end of the 1950s Sandforth was inspired by Giorgio Morandi for another subject, still lifes.

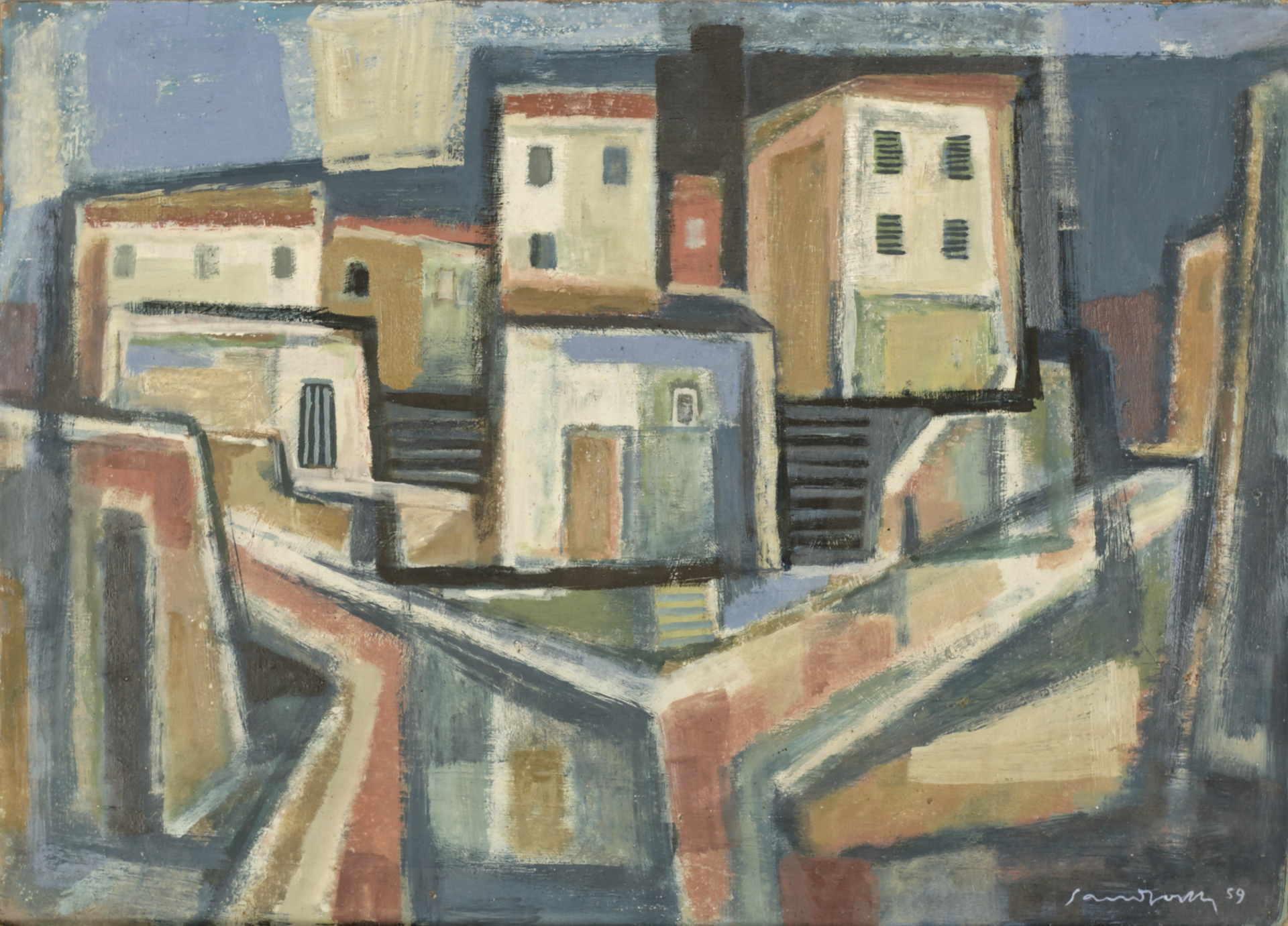
On Elba, 1959

Sandforth spent November 1956 on Elba for the first time, again together with Seidl-Seitz. Impressed by the island's landscape, he made countless sketches in which the artist geometrised individual elements of the nature surrounding him and thus simplified them on paper until he virtually typified them. In 1958, he went on a study trip to Elba, Ischia, Rome and Naples with Paul Schneider, a fellow student from his time in Kassel, who had become his brother-in-law and friend in the meantime, in order to find new motifs and to work more deeply on his own formal language.

Another of Sandforth's companions was the Ahlen artist and art teacher Hermann Schweizer, with whom Sandforth repeatedly exchanged ideas. In 1961, Sandforth went on a study trip to Greece with him and Paul Schneider, which was extraordinarily inspiring for all of them. For Sandforth, the view of the fascinating architecture of Santorini was "the decisive impetus to depart from spatiality and from now on to place the structures increasingly in the surface. ... Santorini therefore possibly only gave Sandforth the final impulse to concretely push ahead with his development from now on with a different consciousness."

Whereas Sandforth had already found a reduced and clear formal language based in the pictorial tradition of New Objectivity, his art now developed more strongly into a Constructivist form characterised by more austere pictorial architecture. The landscape paintings and graphic works shown at a solo exhibition in 1963 bear witness to this. This creative cycle also includes drawings of rocky cliffs on Bornholm, motifs from Elba and the Cyclades, from Lake Garda and from Holland. Hermann Schweizer describes in a text for an exhibition in 1973, at which Sandforth brought these pictures together under the title "Study Trips of a Painter", that Sandforth was particularly attracted to the places on Bornholm and Lake Garda "where the ordered crystalline structure of the rocks became visible in its clear, naked form and the variety of its gradations."

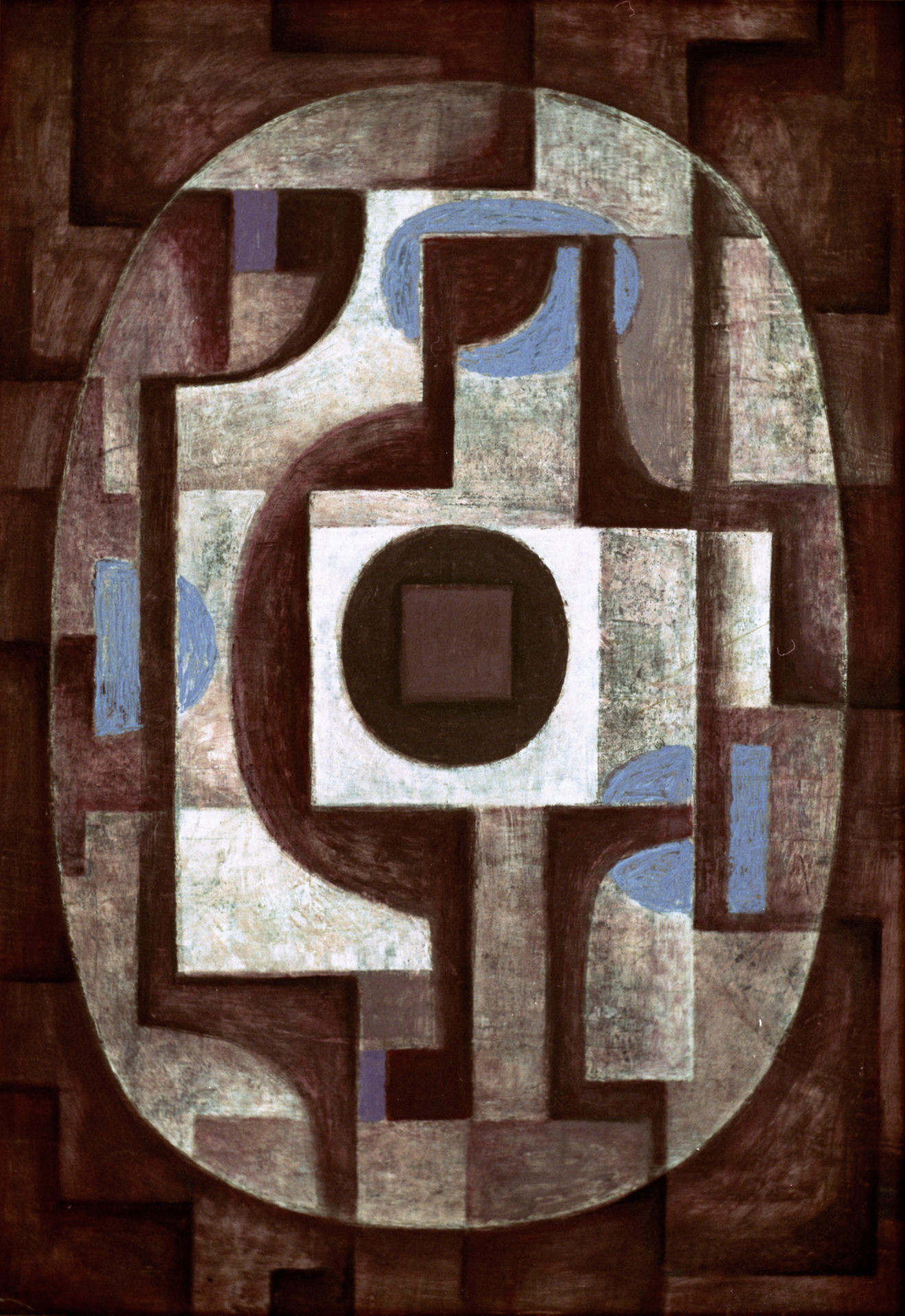
Concertante, 1968

Sandforth's development into a predominantly constructivist painter can be considered complete when looking at his paintings and the years in which they were created. He painted his last representational picture in 1982, a still life, which he revised again around 2000. Another remarkable feature is his new application of paint. He often used hardboard, painting not the smooth side as usual, but the rough side, which by its structure does not allow a smooth application of paint. "He applies the paint, spatulas layers of paint over it, smooths them out again, applies layers of paint again, some of them thin and translucent, until an inherently structured surface emerges with a depth effect that gives the work its liveliness. Often areas of varying density lie next to each other to increase the tension in the painting and Sandforth takes days, weeks, even months to apply this paint.".

Overall, the 1960s can be seen as a period of orientation as far as his painterly development is concerned. Sandforth only participated in isolated exhibitions at this time, so that self-discovery and reinvention could predominantly take place in concentrated work.

==== The active years 1969 to 1979 ====
The new period began with six exhibitions. In the summer of 1969, Sandforth exhibited five paintings as a member of the artist group "arcus" in the municipal museum Herford. In autumn 1969, works by Sandforth and Herbert Schlimgen were presented in the rooms of the Deutsche Bank in Gütersloh. In the autumn of 1970, another exhibition was held together with other members of arcus at Ringenberg Castle. In 1971, the exhibition New Art in an Old Abbey was held at Liesborn Abbey. At the exhibition Artists from East Westphalia at the Kunsthalle Bielefeld, Sandforth was represented in 1969 and 1971. Here Sandforth showed for the first time a group of 15 abstract works. "In these paintings he had concretised his formal language in a short period of time and created works that are consistently characterised by a great harmony and balance."

On the occasion of the artist's 50th birthday in 1972, Bernhard Rest, chairman of the Art Association, organised a solo exhibition at Liesborn Abbey. As a new work, Sandforth showed here the painting Cross in an Oval, with which he thematised the cross form for the first time, which he henceforth took up again and again in a pure form that does not allow any association with the Christian cross to arise.

In 1973, Sandforth again undertook a journey to the Lofoten Islands off the coast of Norway together with Paul Schneider and Hermann Schweizer. The gorges and massive rock formations that filled his sketchbooks fascinated him so much that he set off there again in 1976. The oil paintings based on the sketches were then created in the studio at home in a simple, matter-of-fact reduction. The paintings from the first trip, which were, however, created in the studio and not directly in front of nature, were presented by the artist under the title "Sketches from the North".

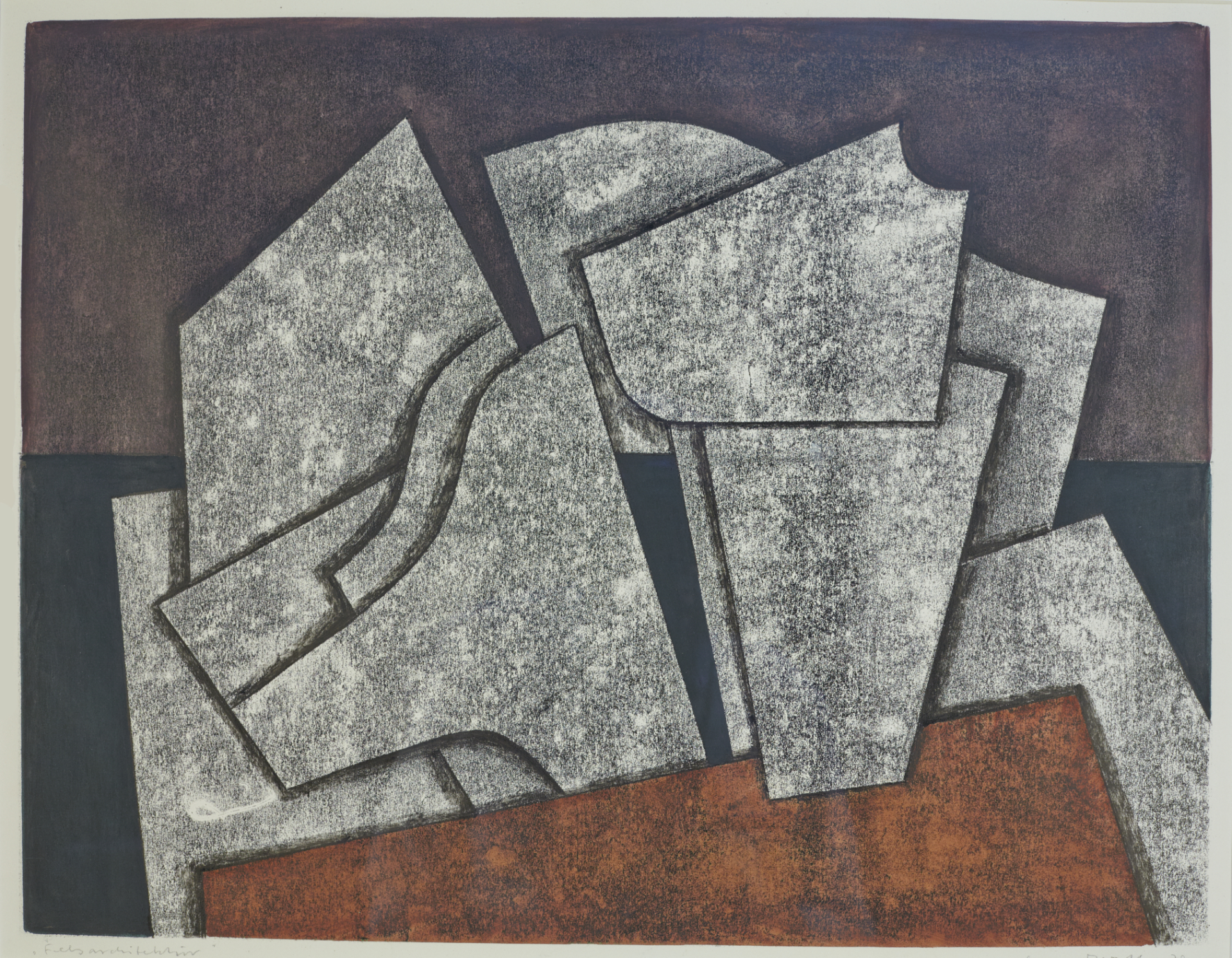
Rock Architecture, 1978

In the early 1970s, Sandforth met the painter Fritz Winter, who is one of the most important German representatives of abstract painting. Although Winter was 17 years older than Sandforth, the two quickly found a close exchange. Winter had already been involved with abstract painting for many years and had found his own abstract pictorial solutions. In 1975 he introduced Sandforth to his niece Helga Gausling, who lived in Ahlen and opened the Fritz Winter House there in the same year. Among other things, Sandforth helped to set up her first art exhibition in 1978 and subsequently held numerous exhibitions there himself, including frequent solo exhibitions.

At the end of 1979, Sandforth set off on a trip to the south of France, where he also visited Antibes and Aix-en-Provence. As he had done during his time as a prisoner of war, he was captivated by the sun-drenched landscape. He returned to his studio with a large number of watercolours and sketches.

By purely quantitative standards, the seventies were the most artistically active years in the artist's life. Sandforth participated in 23 exhibitions and contested 5 solo exhibitions. The catalogue of paintings alone shows 170 new works, from architectural and relief works to layered stencils, with a clear pictorial structure and his highly individual abstracting formal language.

==== The quieter 1980s ====
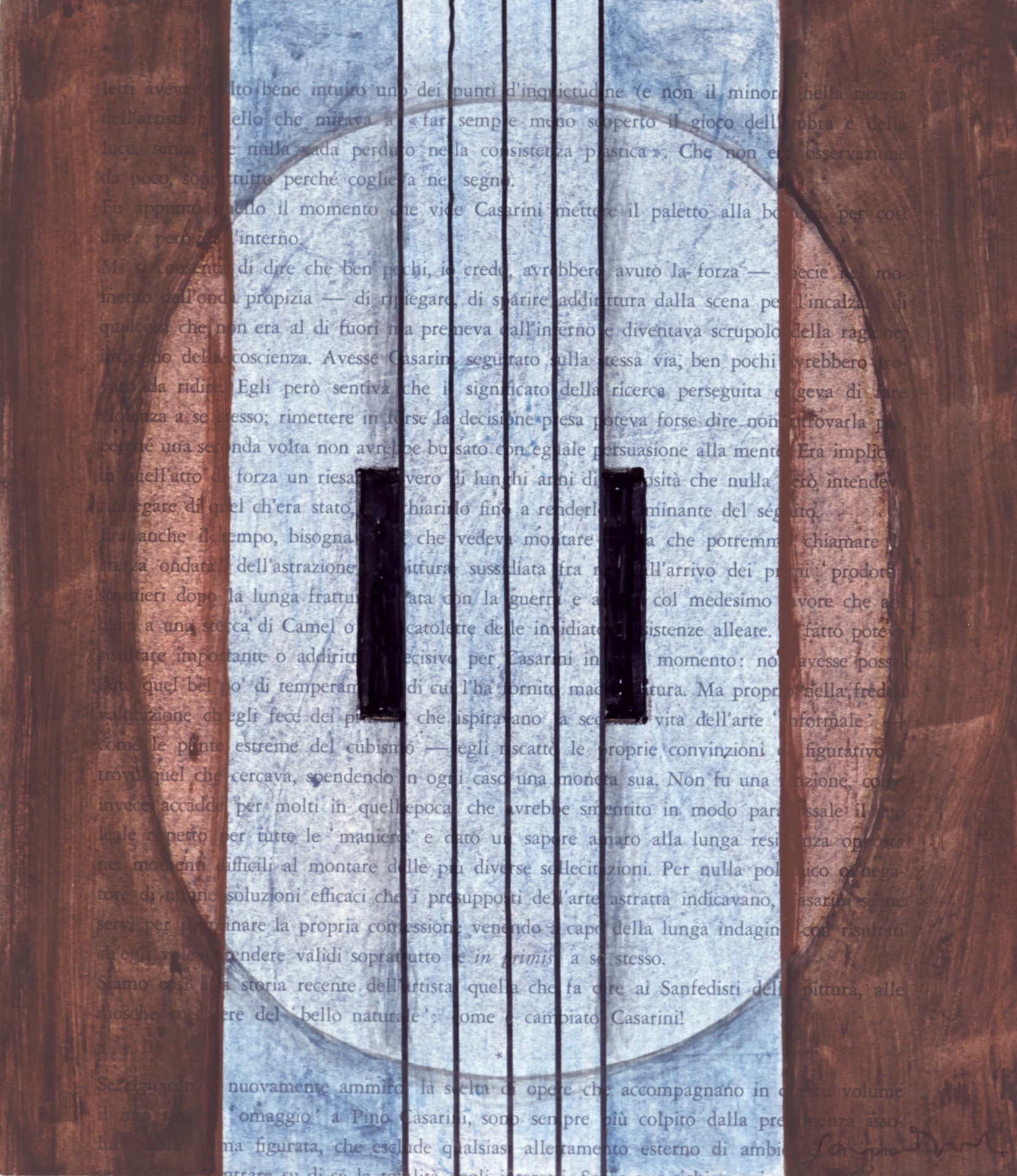
Casarini, 1994

In 1979 Sandforth met the painter Heinrich Siepmann (1904–2002), one of the most important representatives of the German post-war avant-garde. As a friend for many years, Siepmann exerted no small influence on Sandforth's further development as a painter, based on similarities in his life, in his conception of art in general and in questions of pictorial form and composition. This decade is marked by greater calm: fewer exhibitions, less travel, a reduced number of new paintings. It seems as if Sandforth needed the quiet in the studio to question his own artistic expression, to develop it further and to arrive at new strictly non-representational, constructivist pictorial ideas. The relationship of the forms to each other and to the overall pictorial architecture runs thematically through the early works of the 1980s. The first work in strict symmetry, Gegeneinander mit Halbrunden in der großen Fassung, he still signs in the centre front. Sandforth extended the ambivalence between calm and tension in the structure of the individual pictorial elements by introducing a vertical line as an accentuating moment in his paintings. In these works, one can see how the painter struggles for a balance in the picture, how the rising or sinking form is brought into harmony, how colour surfaces and surface boundaries circle each other. And finally, he moves from abstract art towards Art Concret after Theo van Doesburg: Nothing is more concrete than a line, a colour, a surface. For Sandforth, however, harmony, regularity and balance are also part of it. His paintings with a few colour surfaces offset against each other create a harmonious spatial structure.

=== The late work ===
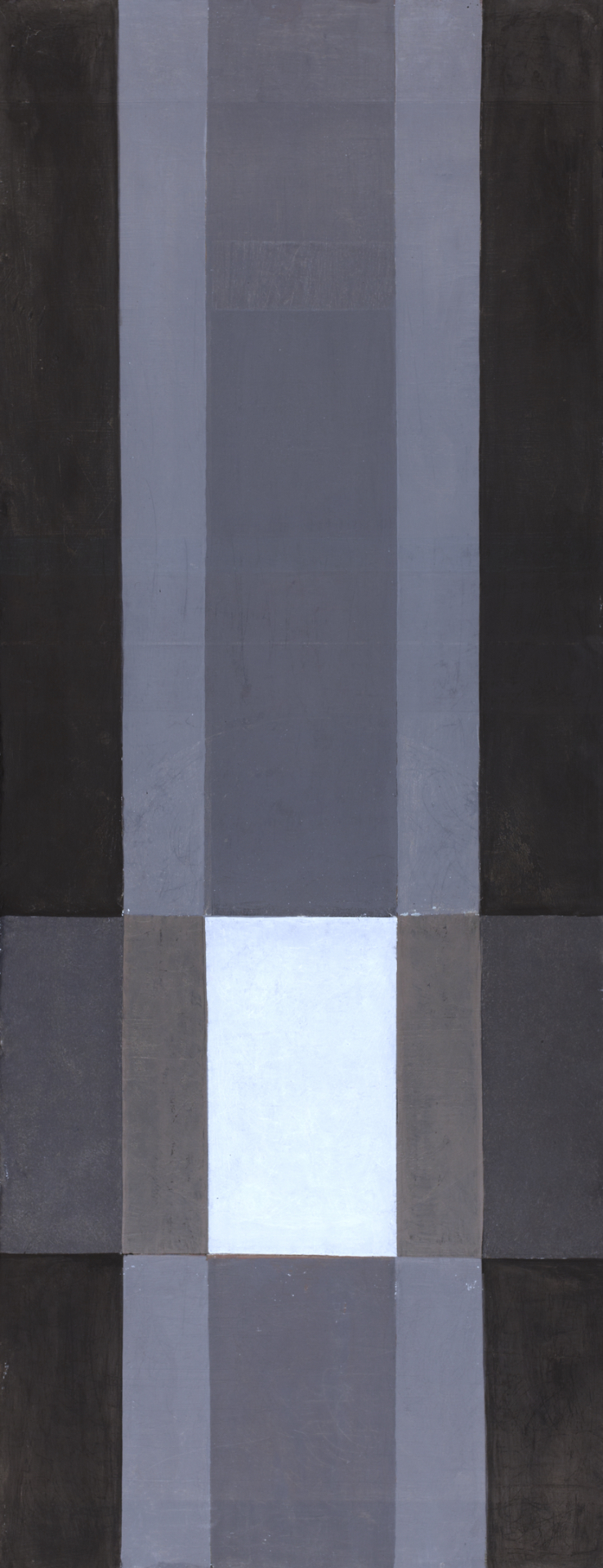
Deep Cross, 2012

In the works since the beginning of the 1990s, two new themes seem to appear, the stele and the triptych, only seemingly because references back to the first beginnings of his artistic work can be discerned. While works on stelae are not uncommon in sculpture, the stele is a rarely used pictorial form, especially in figurative painting. Both the triptych and the stele are reminiscent of traditional forms of sacred art in Western and Northern Europe, so that both pictorial forms evoke pictorial memories in the viewer without Sandforth filling them with religious pictorial content. Rather, he used the strict, purely vertical form of the stele to convey the impression of a spatial situation to the viewer with the help of a reduced geometric vocabulary of forms. While the young artist created his first triptych in 1946 with the title The End in One Go, there are now paintings created in three different years (1996, 2000, 2001), which he puts together to form a triptych, thus not only creating a body of work, but also setting the individual paintings in architectural interaction with each other, as it were.

At the beginning of the new millennium, his wife Lotte fell ill and finally died in 2006, after which it took a long time before Sandforth was able to concentrate on painting again. In addition to smaller paintings, he also created several larger steles in formats of 140 cm × 50 cm (55 in × 20 in) and 130 cm × 60 cm (51 in × 24 in) as well as an oval measuring 100 cm × 75 cm (39 in × 30 in) – masterpieces at the end of a long and evolving artistic life in which the artist, by his own admission, always followed his inner compass.

=== Death ===
Sandforth died on 7 January 2017 in Rietberg, Germany.

== Exhibitions ==
Willi Sandforth's works were shown in at least 80 exhibitions from 1951 until shortly before his death and more after his death. Of these, at least 16 were solo exhibitions. Works were exhibited in Munich, Stuttgart, Berlin, Linz (Austria), Gothenburg (Sweden), Düsseldorf, Münster, Dortmund, Hamm, Ahlen, Bielefeld and other cities in Germany. Of particular note is the exhibition on the occasion of his 90th birthday, somewhat belatedly, from 15 February to 24 April 2014 simultaneously at the Kunstmuseum Ahlen and the Fritz Winter House there.

In the aforementioned catalogue raisonné of 207 A4 pages, which is available in the trade, only his oil paintings are included, more than 900 and without any claim to completeness; about 200 oil paintings could not be included here because their whereabouts (sold, given away, lost) could no longer be ascertained. In addition, there were thousands of drawings and sketches. Some of these works are in museums such as the Art Museum Ahlen, the Gustav-Lübcke-Museum Hamm and the Museum of the Liesborn Abbey, many are with collectors and in other private collections as well as in the artist's estate, which is administered by his son.

== Works (excerpt) ==
The following is some of the works from his creative periods and his Constructivist pieces.

=== Figurative works ===
*	*	*	*	*	*
around 1980: Houses in the South of France, oil on paper, 68x50, G388	around 1971: WS 3580 Mountain village on Lake Garda, oil on canvas, 38x66, G19	1965: WS 3586 Small shipyard (variant), oil on monotype on paper, 50x70, G178	1966: 1966: WS 3587 Indemini (Ticino), oil on monotype on paper, 55x70, G181	WS 3588a untitled, drawing, ink on paper, watercoloured	WS 3589 o. Titel, drawing, ink on paper, watercoloured
WS 3590 untitled, drawing, ink on paper, watercolour	WS 3591 o. Titel, drawing, ink on paper, watercoloured	WS 3592 untitled, drawing, ink on paper, watercoloured	WS 3594 o. Titel, drawing, chalk on paper, watercoloured	WS 3596 untitled, drawing, ink and felt-tip pen on paper, watercoloured	1966: WS 3598 Small harbour (Bornholm), mixed media, oil on monotype on paper, 60x70

Other works (Photos of these works are partly included in Figurativ paintings by Willi Sandforth (see Weblinks).)

c. 1946: Self-portraits, oil on paper, 41x34, G2+3; 1946: The End (Triptych I-III), oil on paper on cardboard, 46x72; 72x56; 46x72, G4-6; 1947: Lotte, early portrait, oil on canvas, 40x35, G19; 1948: Harbour in Tönning, oil on cardboard, 43x68, G27; 1948: Circus in Kassel, oil on cardboard, 30x50, G30; 1952: My wife, oil on cardboard, 1952, 98x68, G41; 1953: Drawbridge in Neuharlingersiel, oil on hardboard, 42x56, G58; around 1960: Ships in the harbour of Tönning, oil on cardboard, 31x60, G138; 1961: Santorin, oil on monotype on paper, 60x80, G148	1971: Mountain village at Lake Garda, oil on canvas, 38x64, G241; around 1976: Rocks on Bornholm, oil on paper, 50x70, G317; 1977: Before the horizon, oil on monotype on paper, 63x90, G318; c. 1980: Shadowed backyard, oil on paper, 69x50, G378; c. 1980: Houses in the South of France, oil on paper, 68x50, G388; c. 1981: Rock shape with hatching, oil on cardboard, 42x33, G426; c. 1889: Obelisk, oil on cardboard, 27x13, G559; around 1989: Sketch of a woman's head (after Picasso), oil on plywood, 50x45, G543; finished around 2000, started 1982: Still life, oil on hardboard, 25x50, G992

=== Constructivist works ===
*	*	*	*	*	*
1966 WS 1450 Strictly built, oil on cardboard, 100x70	1970 WS 0457 Staggered surfaces in red, oil on hard fibre, 80x60	1972 WS 0494 Geometric Game, oil on canvas, 152x100	1975 WS 3567 Layering and Hatching, oil on hardboard, 57x57	1978, WS 3574 Silhouettes, oil on monotype on paper, 65x45	around 1992 WS 1992 Composition with row of forms in an oval (small version), oil on canvas, mounted on wood, 19x17
1978 WS 3570 Layering with red and blue accent, oil on hardboard, 100x85	1990 WS 3570 Counterpressure (small version) oil on canvas 23x11	1992 WS 1051 Flat composition, oil on hardboard, 68x98	1998 WS 0257 Small plank in grey, oil on canvas, 100x30	2006 WS 3364 Staggered surfaces, oil on hardboard 66x55	1992 WS 1400 Dancing perpendiculars, oil on hardboard, 30x85

Other works (Photos of these works are partly included in Constructivist Paintings by Willi Sandforth (see Weblinks).)

c. 1959: Aero, oil on paper, 50x30, G118; around 1968: Relief (blue), oil on monotype on paper, 49x42, G203; 1977: Form layering, glazed oil, ink and pencil on paper, 23x31, G321; 1978: Rock architecture, oil on monotype on paper, 72x86, G245; 1978: Before the horizon (II), oil on monotype on paper, 60x70, G346; 1972: Geometric Game, oil on canvas, 155x100, G267; 1975: Rotating (large version), oil on hardboard,100x100, G294; c. 1976: Split Form, oil on canvas,68x50, G388; 1978: Against a dark background, oil on monotype on paper, 55x45, G347; 1980: With red caesura, oil on monotype on paper 40x3,0, G390	around 1985: Divided red block, oil on wood, 21x18, G491; around 1986: With small triangle, oil on canvas 23x12, G478; around 1986: Entangled (Variant), oil on canvas, 24x20, G515; around 1988: Layering in the Oval, 46x58, G539; c. 1991: Counterpressure (Small version), 23x11, G592; around 1991: Double Trapezium, oil on canvas 23x13, G584; c. 1992: Composition with row of forms in an oval (small version), oil on canvas, mounted on wood, 19x17 G597; 1994: Diagonal – Vertical, oil on hardboard, 23x20, G626; 1999: White form with blue accent, oil on hardboard, 44x41, G720; around 1996: Small panel painting, oil on canvas, 22X29, G663
