= George Phillips (canon lawyer) =

German canon lawyer (1804–1872)

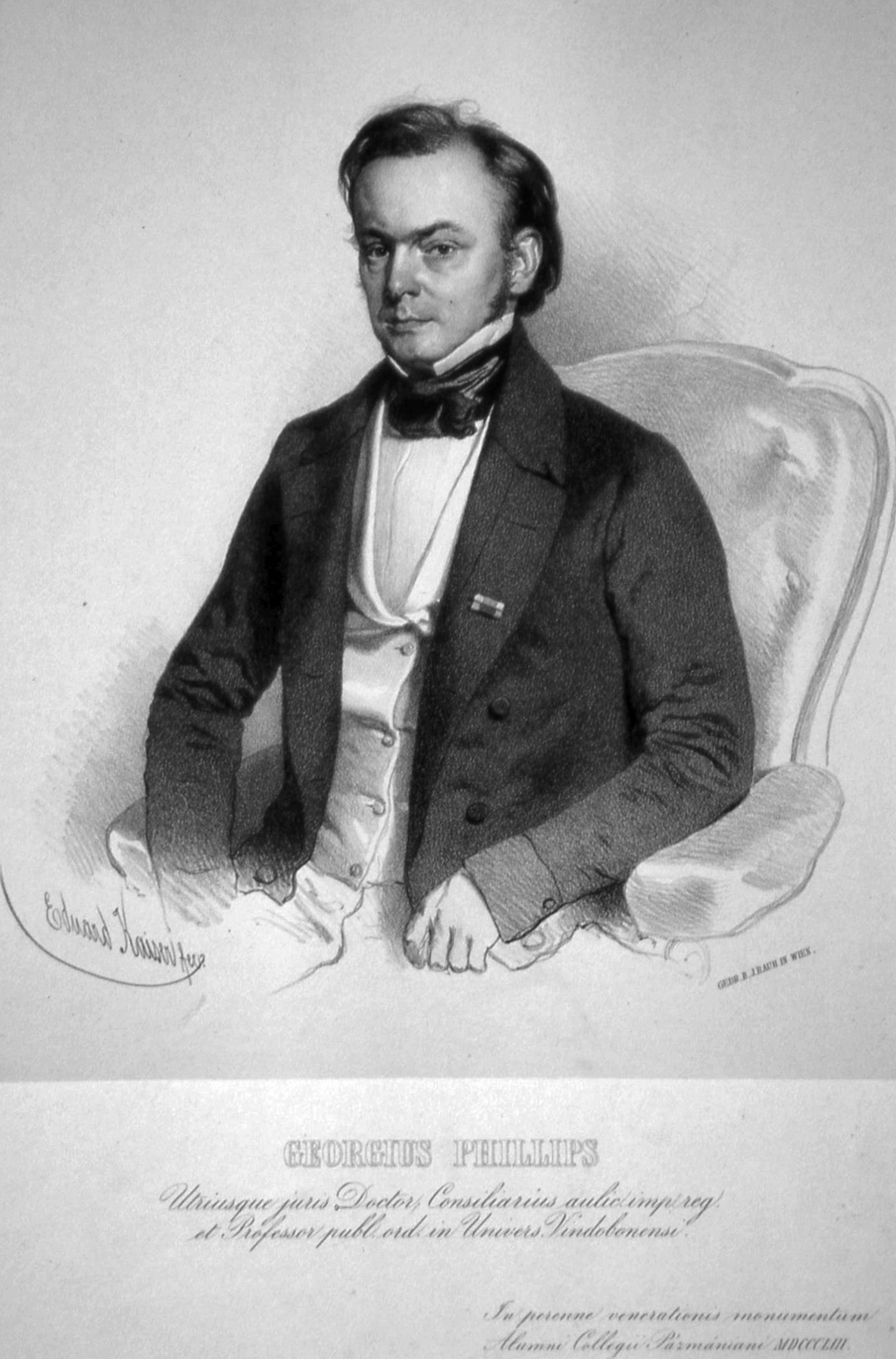
Georg Phillips, lithograph by Eduard Kaiser, 1853

George Phillips (6 September 1804 – 6 September 1872) was a German canon lawyer.

== Life ==
He was born in Königsberg, the son of James Phillips, an Englishman who had acquired wealth as a merchant in Königsberg, and of a Scotswoman née Hay. On completing his course at the gymnasium, George studied law at the Friedrich Wilhelm University of Berlin and the University of Göttingen (1822–24); his principal teachers were von Savigny and Karl Friedrich Eichhorn, and, under the influence of the latter, he devoted himself mainly to the study of Germanic law.

After obtaining the degree of Doctor of Law at Göttingen in 1824, he paid a long visit to England. In 1826, he qualified at Berlin as Privatdozent (tutor) for German law, and in 1827 was appointed professor extraordinary in this faculty. In the same year he married Charlotte Housselle, who belonged to a French Protestant family settled in Berlin. Phillips formed a close friendship with his colleague K. E. Jarcke, professor at Berlin since 1825, who had entered the Catholic Church in 1824. Jarcke's influence and his own studies on medieval Germany led to the conversion of Phillips and his wife in 1828 (14 May).

Jarcke having moved to Vienna in 1832, Phillips accepted in 1833 a call to Munich as counsel in the Bavarian Ministry of the Interior. In 1834, he was named professor of history, and a few months later professor of law at the Ludwig-Maximilians-Universität München. He now joined a Catholic circle including Joseph Görres, Johann Adam Möhler, Ignaz von Döllinger, and Johann Nepomuk von Ringseis. In 1838, he founded with Guido Görres the militant "Historischpolitische Blätter".

In consequence of the Lola Montez affair, in connexion with which Phillips signed, with six other Munich professors, an address of sympathy with the dismissed minister Abel, he was relieved of his chair in 1847. In 1848, he was elected deputy of a Münster district for the National Assembly of Frankfort, at which he upheld Catholic interests. In 1850, after declining a call as professor to Würzburg, he accepted the chair of German law at Innsbruck. Invited to fill the same chair in Vienna in 1851, he moved to the Austrian capital, and remained there until his death.

In 1862-7 he accepted a long leave of absence to complete his Kirchenrecht. He always maintained his relations with his friends in Munich and other cities of Germany, and never relaxed as a Catholic activist. He died in Vienna.

== Works ==
As a writer, his labours lay in the domain of German law, canon law, and their respective histories. At first his activity was directed mainly towards German law with his principal contributions to the subject being:

- "Versuch einer Darstellung des angelsächsischen Rechtes" (Göttingen, 1825);
- "Englische Reichs- und Rechtsgeschichte", of which two volumes (dealing with the period 1066-1189) appeared (Berlin, 1827-8);
- "Deutsche Geschichte mit besonderer Rücksicht auf Religion, Recht und Verfassung", of which two volumes alone were issued (Berlin, 1832-4), deals with Merovingian and Carolingian times;
- "Grundsätze des gemeinen deutschen Privatrechts mit Einschluss des Lehnrechts" (Berlin, 1838);
- "Deutsche Reichs- und Rechtsgeschichte" (Munich, 1845).

After his call to Munich, however, Phillips moved to a treatment of canon law from a strictly Catholic standpoint. In addition to numerous smaller treatises, he published in this domain:

- "Die Diözesansynode" (Freiburg, 1849);
- "Kirchenrecht", his major work, which appeared in seven volumes (Ratisbon, 1845–72), and was continued by Vering (vol. VIII, i, Ratisbon, 1889). This comprehensive work exercised influence on the study of canon law and its principles.

Phillips also published a "Lehrbuch des Kirchenrechts" (Ratisbon, 1859–62; 3rd ed. by Moufang, 1881) and "Vermischte Schriften" (3 vols., Ratisbon, 1856–60).
