= Bad Lippspringe Gardening Show 2017 =

2017 horticulture expo in Germany

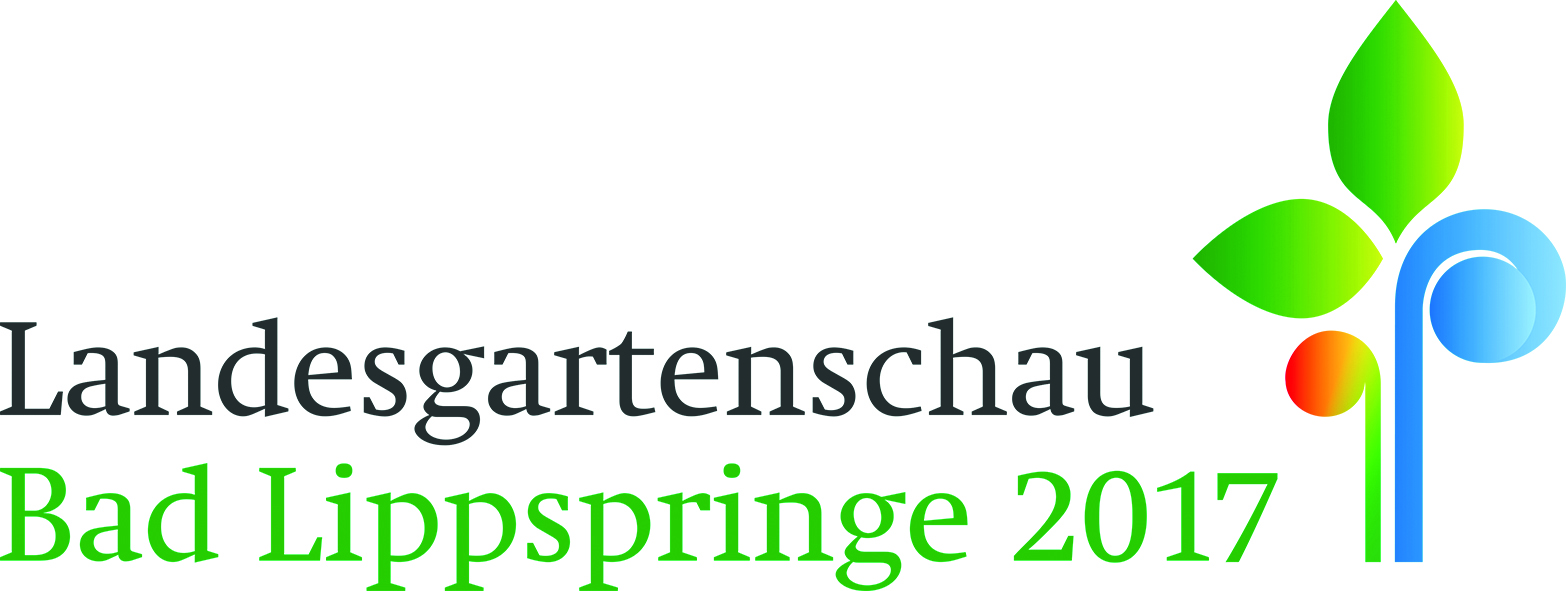
- Native name: Landesgartenschau Bad Lippspringe 2017
- Date: April 12 – October 15, 2017
- Location: Bad Lippspringe

Bad Lippspringe 2017 was a horticultural show and the 17th State Garden Show of North Rhine-Westphalia. On June 1, 2011, the city of Bad Lippspringe was chosen out of five applications by the NRW Ministry.

The garden show took place from April 12 to October 15, 2017. The motto of the show was "Floral splendor & Forest idyll". This was also the first garden show in North Rhine-Westphalia to take place with the forest as backdrop. The town of Bad Lippspringe is the smallest town to date to receive the finance to host the Landesgartenschau NRW.

The exhibition was located in the forest and in the Arminiuspark, which are connected to the city centre by a boulevard. Flower shows and theme gardens were the main attractions.

The horticultural show consisted of two areas: the Kaiser Karl Park and the Kurwald (a section of the forest) with a surface area of about 30 hectares, and the second being the Arminiuspark (3 hectares) within the city. During the period of the garden show the Arminiuspark was partially fenced off.

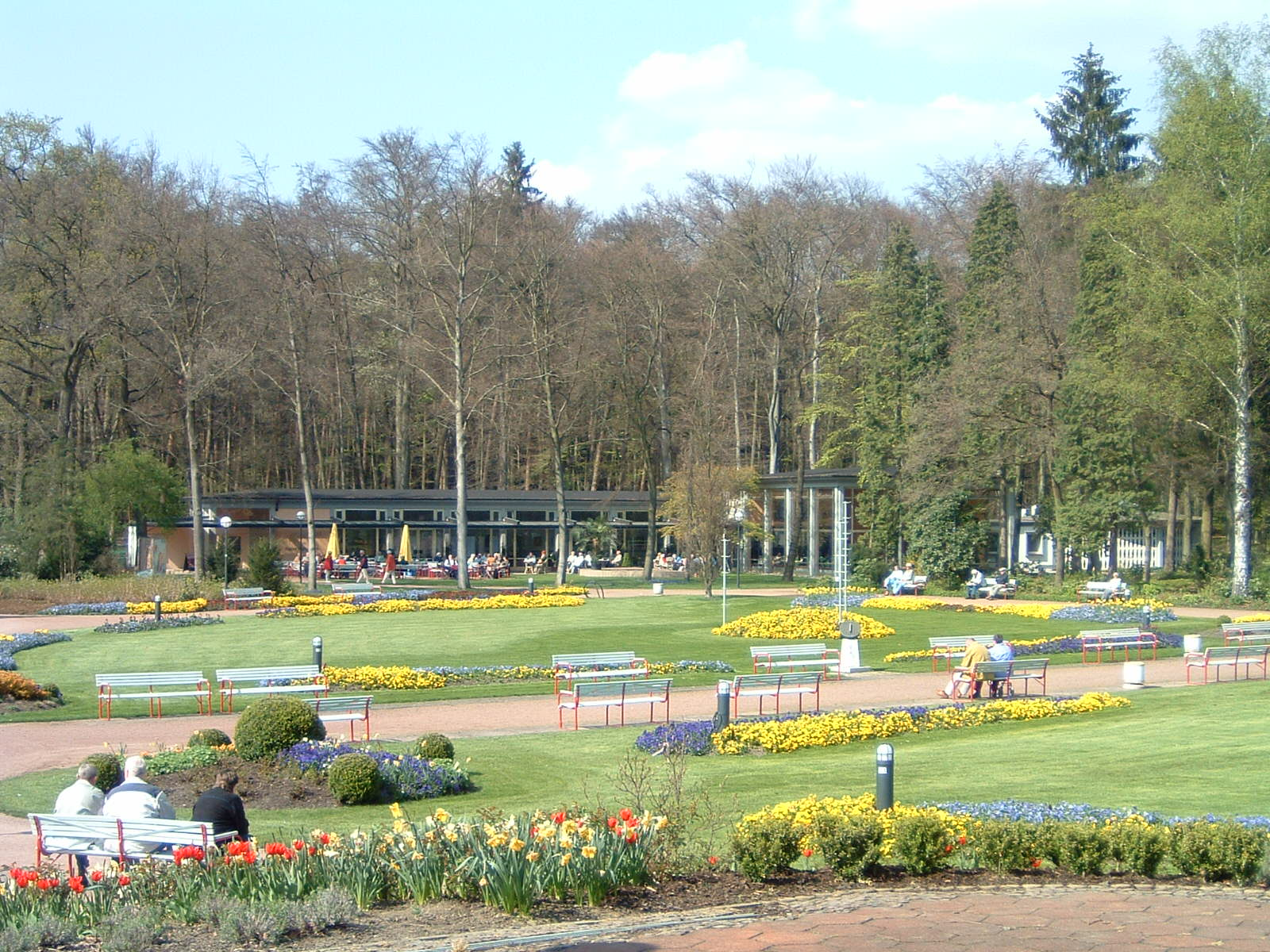
Kaiser-Karls-Park before its conversion to the garden show

== Venue ==
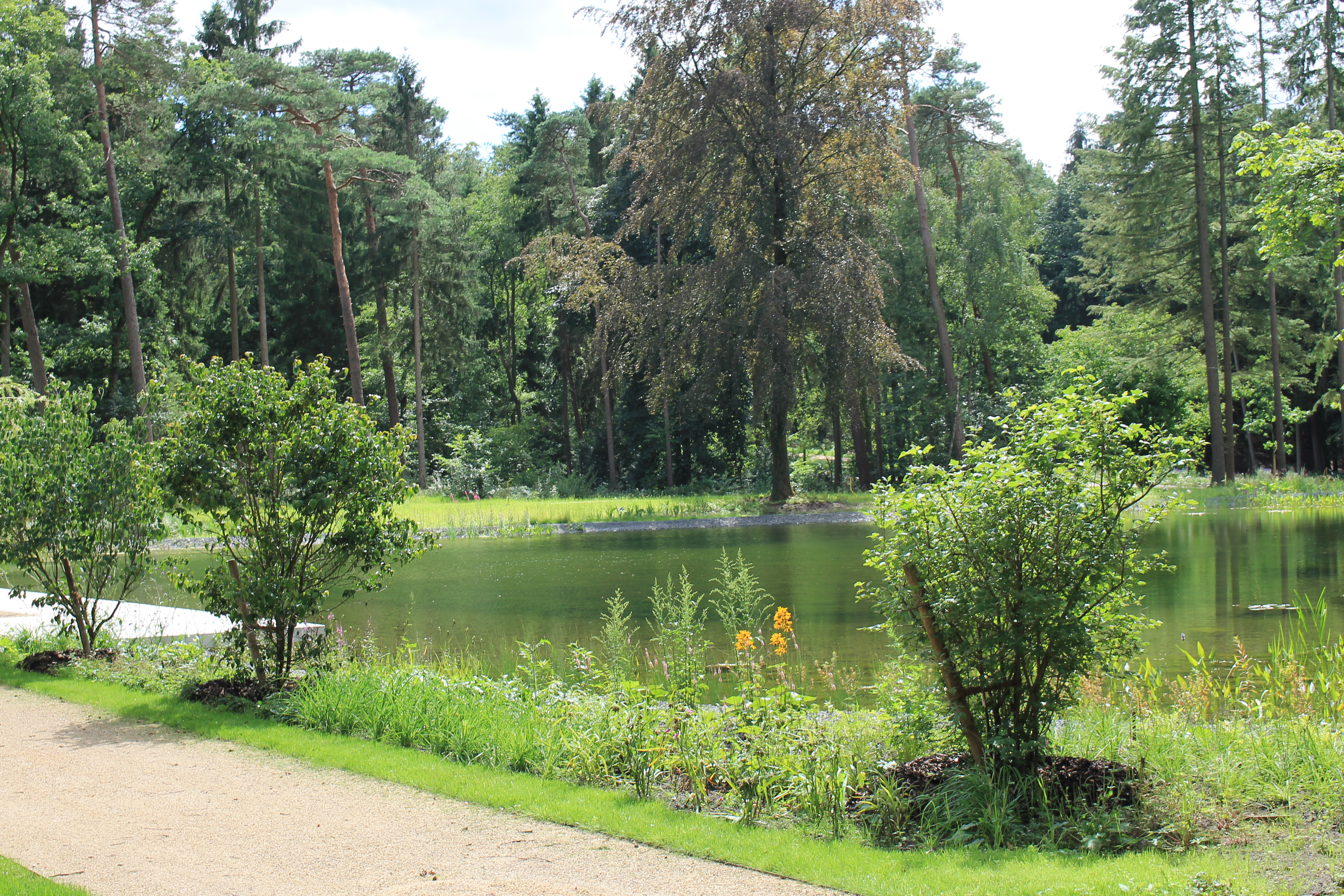
view to Mersmann ponds, area of the garden show

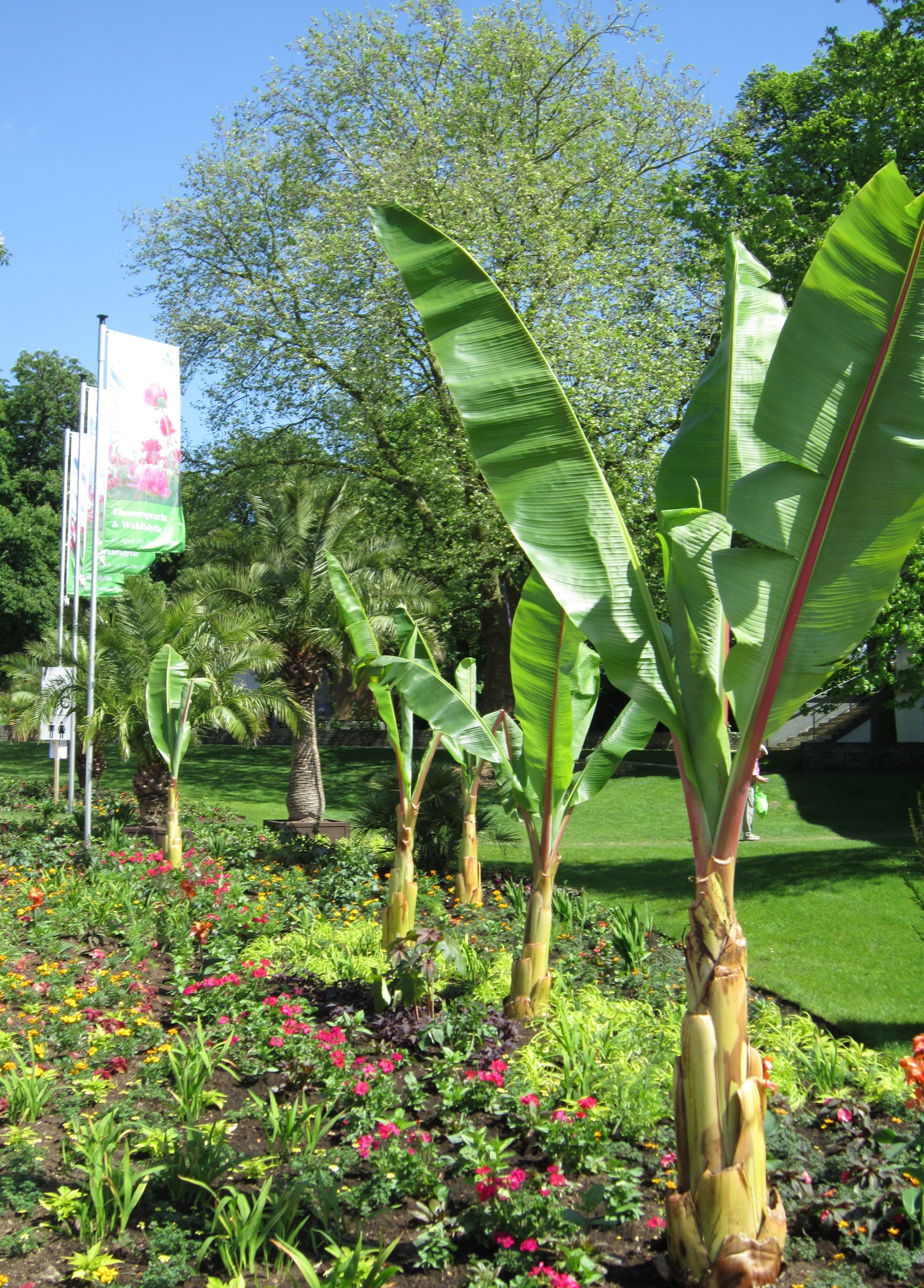
Arminiuspark during the garden show

Bad Lippspringe was the first place to hold a garden show in a forest setting. True to the motto "Blumenpracht & Waldidylle" ("Floral splendor & Forest idyll") there were flower shows, themed gardens and events between the parks and the city centre.

The preliminary studies for the founding of the Bad Lippspringe gardening show 2017 began in June 2009. Feasibility studies started in September 2010, the application was made in January 2011. Bad Lippspringe competed with other better known spa towns and ultimately got the financial support in June 2011. The first steps on the way to the gardening show were the decisions on the mascot "Lippolino" in May 2012 and on the logo in January 2013. Following the competition of landscape architects which took place from April to November 2013, construction work started in February 2014.

The gardening show hoped to achieve sustainable outcomes. Accordingly, Bad Lippspringe received further grants, amongst others from the urban development promotion programme, up to the year 2017. The city targeted day trippers, spa visitors and locals equally.
