= Ludwig Arndts von Arnesberg =

German jurist (1803-1878)

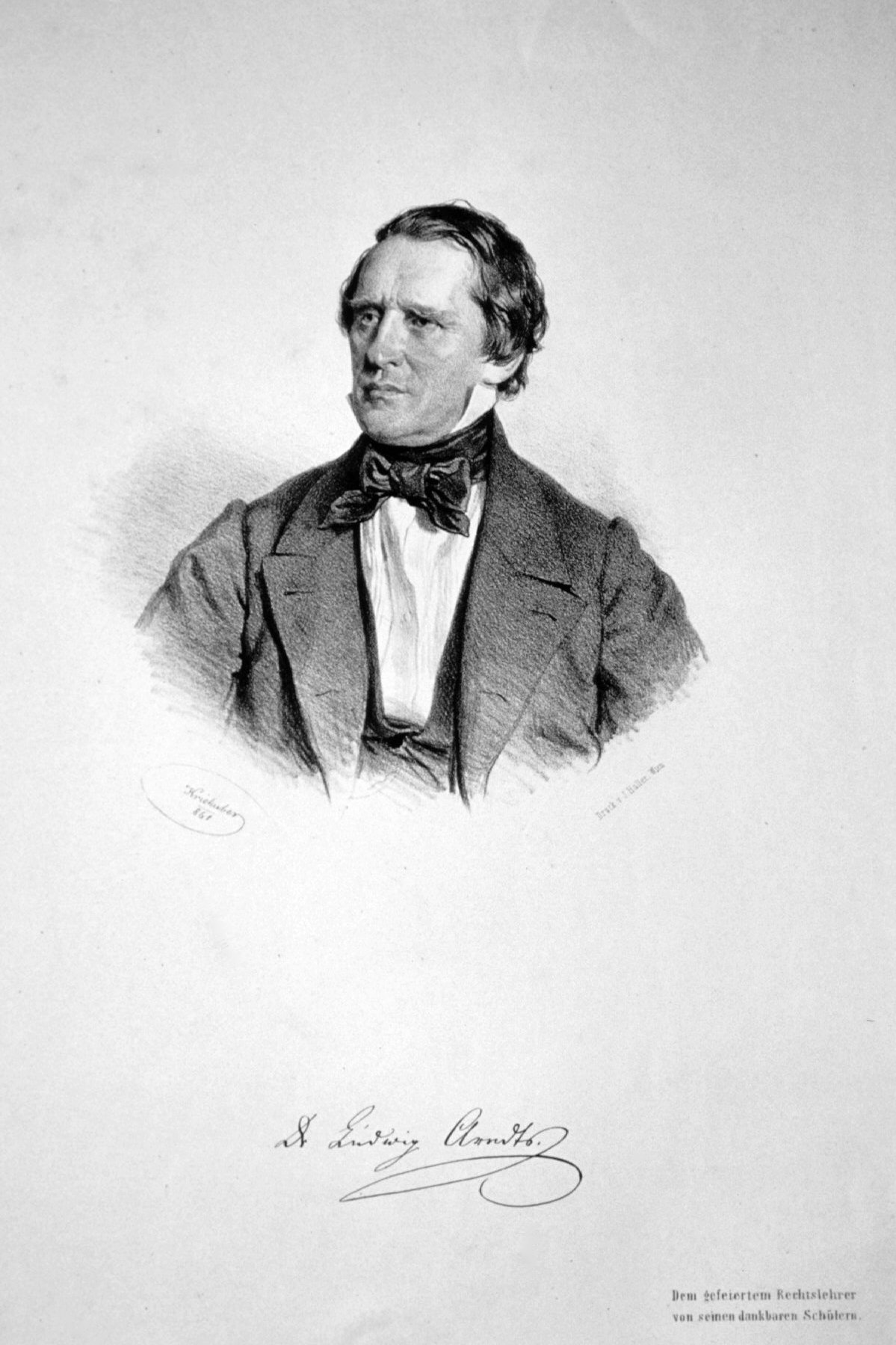

Ludwig Arndts von Arnesberg (19 August 1803, in Arnsberg, Prussia – 1 March 1878, in Vienna) was a German jurist.

== Biography ==
He was first appointed professor of jurisprudence at the University of Bonn, then held the same position at the University of Breslau, the Ludwig-Maximilians-Universität München, and finally, in 1855, at the University of Vienna, where he remained until his death. In 1848, he was a member of the National Assembly at Frankfurt, where he advocated strongly the right of Austria to enter the German Confederacy. In 1860, he married the composer and writer Maria Vespermann Gorres. In 1871, he was knighted by the Emperor of Austria.

== Works ==
His chief works are:

- Lehrbuch der Pandekten (“Pandects textbook,” 14th ed., 1899)
- Juristische Encyclopädie und Methodologie (“Encyclopedia of Jurisprudence and Methodology,” 9th ed., 1895)
- Die Lehre von den Vermächtnissen (“Inheritance law,” 3 vols., 1875)
- Gesammelte zivilistische Schriften (“Collected writings on civil law,” 3 vols., 1874)
- Kritische Uberschau der deutschen Gesetzgebung und Rechtswissenschaft (“Critical overview of German lawmaking and jurisprudence,” in collaboration with Johann Kaspar Bluntschli and Joseph Pözl, 8 vols., 1854)
