= Dreingau =

Dreingau is the medieval name of one of five Saxon pagi (i.e., boroughs) in what today is the Münsterland in Westphalia. During the Middle Ages documents referred to it as Dreine, Dreni, Drieni, Dragini, Dragieni, Drachina or Treine. The name came into use around the year 800, and is hardly used anymore today. It has survived only in the name of the town Drensteinfurt, and in the name of a regional newspaper, the Dreingau-Zeitung.

== Location ==
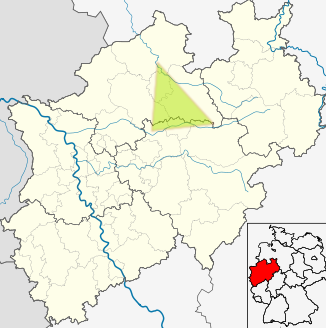
Approximate location of the Dreingau in today's North Rhine-Westphalia

The origins of the name Dreingau are disputed; it might derive either from a medieval term denoting a "fertile land," or might describe a "dry land". Considering that the Saxon pagi still held extensive marshlands at this time, both interpretations might well be equivalent.

Although the sources are frequently inconsistent or ambiguous in assigning various places to the Dreingau, the consensus is that the pagus was of roughly triangular shape, with the Lippe between Lippstadt and Lünen forming the southern border, and with the city of Greven as the anchor point in the North. Close to the Lippe river was the large forest Ihtari (later known as Ihteri and then Ichtern). South of the Dreingau was the pagus Bracbant, home to tribes of the Bructeri; to the north was Bursibant around Rheine; other neighboring areas were the Skopingau centered on Schöppingen, and the Stevergau around Coesfeld.

Notable places mentioned in medieval documents in the context of the Dreingau include the village Wernina (now Werne), Seliheim (now Selm), and Liesborn Abbey but there is little mention of Münster.

== History ==
The Dreingau had been a theatre of war even before it got its name. In the times of the expansionist drive of the Roman Empire against the Germanic people the Battle of the Lupia River in 16 BC and the Battle of Idistaviso in 16 AD mark the period when the Dreingau area was either a staging point or a battlefield. It figured centrally in the Saxon Wars of Charlemagne from 772 onward. During the Thirty Years' War the Dreingau was devastated by troops led by Christian the Younger of Brunswick.
