= Vering =

Vering is a German surname. Notable people with the surname include:

- Brad Vering (born 1977), American Greco-Roman wrestler
- Friedrich Heinrich Vering (1833–1896), German canon lawyer
- Jan Vering (1954–2021), German gospel singer, newspaper editor, and dramaturge
