= Maria Vespermann =

German composer, writer, and painter

Maria Vespermann Gorres Arndts (5 April 1823 – 22 May 1882) was a German composer, writer, and painter who sometimes used the pseudonym Carl Pauss. Her music was also published under the names Maria Gorres and Maria Arndts.

Vespermann was born in Munich to the actor Wilhelm Vespermann and singer Clara Metzger Vespermann. She showed musical talent at an early age, and appeared in her first public concert when she was only 12 years old.

Vespermann married the Catholic historian and poet Guido Görres in 1844. They had three daughters before Görres died in 1852. In 1860 she married jurist Carl Ludwig Arndts von Arnesberg in Vienna.

Gorres' music was published by Aibl (now Universal Edition) and her prose was published by Verlag Ferdinand Schöningh.

== Music ==
Her publications include:

=== Piano ===
- Aus den Bergen, opus 8
- Bunte Reihen kurzer Klavierstücke, opus 6
- Four Hand Pieces, opus 5

=== Vocal ===
- Amen Amen! They All Sank to Their Knees (chorus and piano)
- Hail Springtime (chorus and piano)
- It's Lovely in Spring (women's chorus and piano)
- Praise the Lord (chorus and piano)
- Sacred Songs, opus 3
- Song Cycle ( text Friedrich Wilhelm Weber's Dreizehnlinden)
- Thanks be to the Lord (chorus and piano)
- We are the Blacksmiths (men's chorus and piano)

=== Prose ===
- Dramas for the Christian Home
- Juhschreih on the Halseralm
- Mozart as a Matchmaker

== See also ==
- Download free sheet music by Maria Gorres
- Hear Idylle by Maria Gorres
