= Karl Ernst Jarcke =

German publisher (1801–1852)

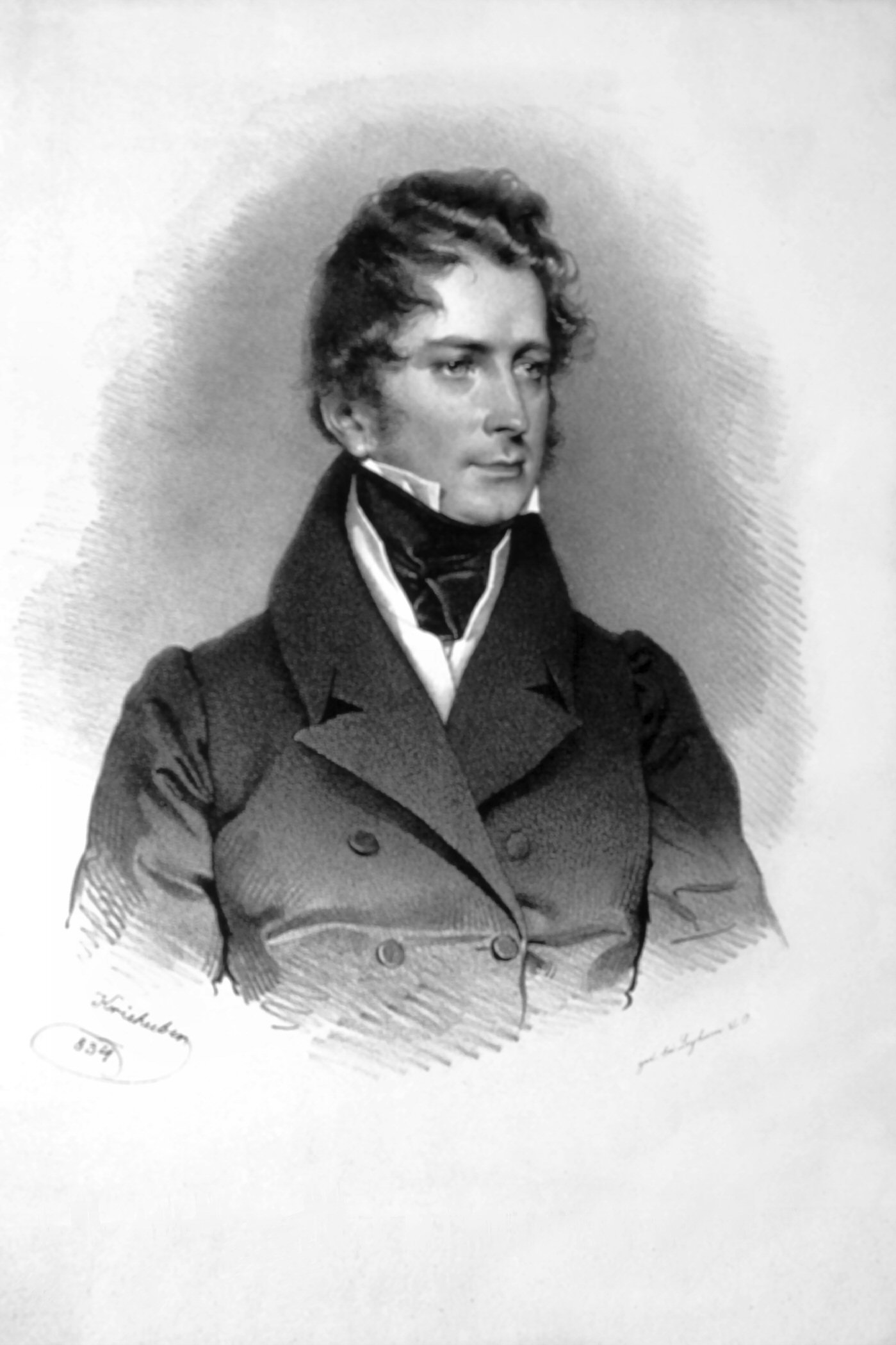
Carl Ernst Jarcke, 1834

Karl Ernst Jarcke (10 November 1801, in Danzig, Prussia – 27 December 1852, in Vienna) was a German publisher and professor of criminal law, who took a conservative stance towards revolutionary movements in the early nineteenth century.

== Biography ==
Jarcke belonged to a Protestant merchant family. He took up the study of jurisprudence, and became at an early age professor of criminal law at Bonn and later in Berlin. His scholarly attachments were especially revealed in his Handbuch des gemeinen deutschen Strafrechts (3 vols., 1827–30). He converted to Catholicism in Cologne in 1824. After the outbreak of the July Revolution in Paris, he wrote an anonymous political brochure, Die franzosische Revolution von 1830. It met the emphatic approval of the circle of friends of the then Crown Prince (later King Frederick William IV of Prussia), which was composed of men of anti-revolutionary views, influenced by Romanticism and by Karl Ludwig von Haller.

Jarcke assumed the editorship of the periodical Politische Wochenblatt, founded by these men in 1831 to promote their ideas. In 1832 Metternich called him to the State Chancery in Vienna to succeed the late Friedrich von Gentz. He accepted the call, but continued an active collaborator of the weekly journal. The residence in Vienna did not satisfy him. In 1837 he broke with his Berlin friends on the subject of the "Cologne Occurrence" -- the imprisonment of the Archbishop of Cologne—of which they approved but which he condemned. In 1838 he founded with George Phillips the Historisch-politische Blatter to support Catholic interests in Germany. When Metternich was overthrown in 1848 Jarcke left Vienna, but returned there when order was restored, and died shortly after.

== Philosophy ==
Jarcke's ideal was the "Germanic State" of the Middle Ages; at its head an hereditary monarch, all claims of the princes on their subjects to be regulated by treaties, the state to be occupied only with the defence in war and the administration of justice; in domestic affairs entirely unrestricted opportunities for development within the confederacy. Of "political necessities", "measures for the welfare of the state", and of a "constitution" Jarcke wished to know nothing, except perhaps of a restriction of the royal prerogative by an advisory popular assembly, which however must be representative of the professions and the interests at stake, not merely founded on a general or property qualification franchise. In his articles on the relations between Church and State he combatted especially the Protestant and Liberal views. In seeming contradiction to his anti-revolutionary year of 1848, he took a willing part in the Catholic movement which began at that time.
