= Sabine Lösing =

German politician (born 1955)

Sabine Lösing MEP
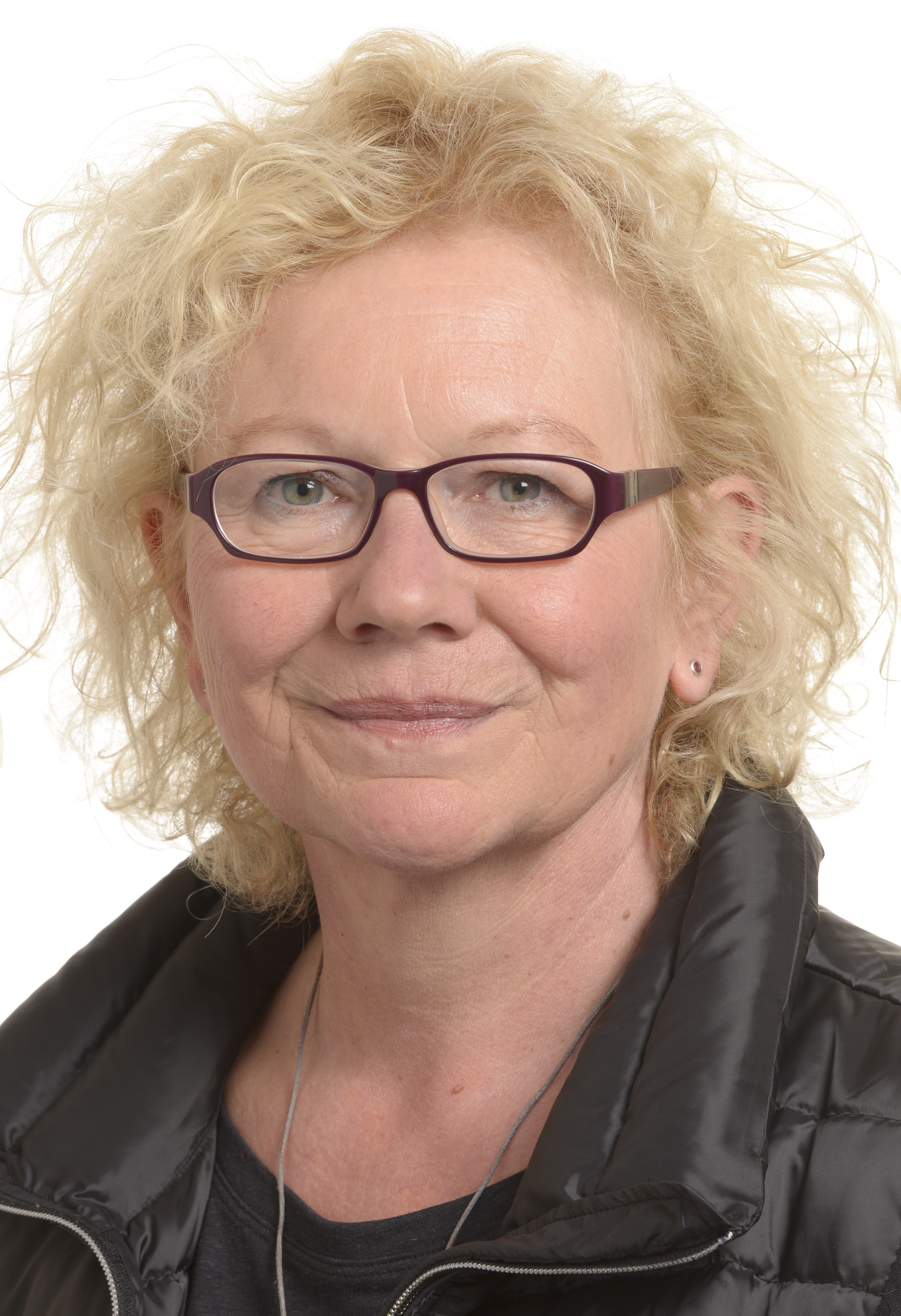

Member of the European Parliament
- Incumbent
- Assumed office 1 July 2009
- Constituency: Germany

Personal details
- Born: 30 November 1955 (age 70) Bad Godesberg, Germany
- Party: German; The Left Party; EU; European United Left–Nordic Green Left
- Website: www.sabine-losing.de

Sabine Lösing (born 30 November 1955) is a German politician and Member of the European Parliament from Germany. She is a member of The Left, part of the European United Left–Nordic Green Left. In February 2013, she was elected as chairwoman of the Die Linke state association in Lower Saxony.
