= Friedrich Wilhelm Weber =

German politician and poet (1813–1894)

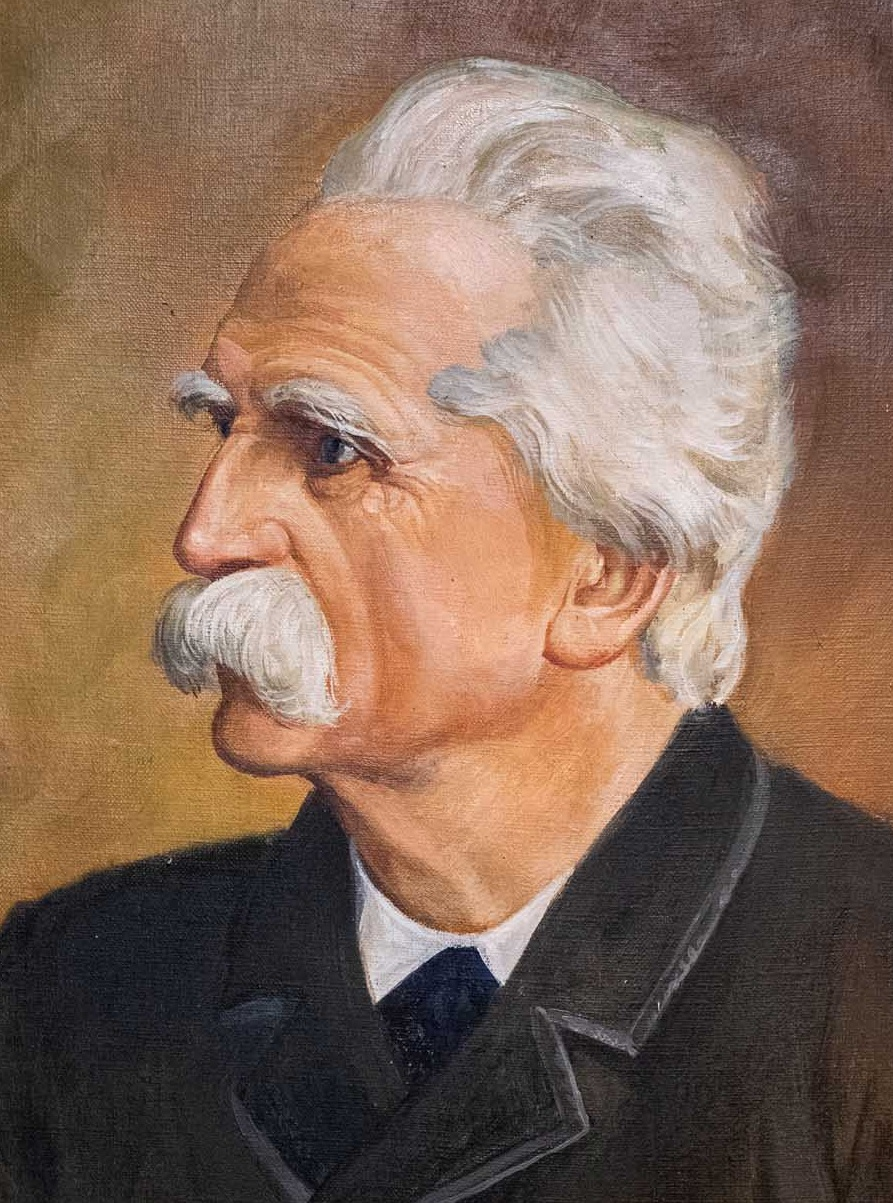
Friedrich Wilhelm Weber.

Friedrich Wilhelm Weber (25 December 1813 – 5 April 1894) was a German doctor, politician of the Prussian House of Deputies, and poet.

== Biography ==
Weber was born in Alhausen, near Bad Driburg, in Westphalia. His father was forester for the Count of Asseburg. Weber first attended the village school, then when thirteen years old he went to the Gymnasium at Paderborn, and afterwards studied medicine at the University of Greifswald. His talent for poetry had been evidenced at the gymnasium; at university, it grew. After spending two years at Greifswald he went to Breslau, where he became acquainted with Gustav Freitag. After a year, however, he returned to Greifswald, where he obtained a doctorate; thence he went to Berlin, where he passed the state medical examination with great honour. After a brief journey for recreation to southern Germany he settled as a physician in Driburg, where he spent twenty-six years.

His practice as a doctor did not keep him from writing poetry. In 1887 he settled permanently at Nieheim. In 1863 he was made Sanitätsrat (honorary title given to a distinguished doctor) in recognition of his medical services; he was made an honorary doctor of philosophy by the academy in Munich, and when he celebrated his semi-centennial as a physician he received the Order of the Red Eagle, fourth class, while three years before his death he received the further honour of the title of Geheimen Sanitätsrat. He was elected a member of the Prussian House of Deputies. He remained a member of the Centre Party until 1893, when he declined a re-election on account of his health.

== Work ==
Weber's poetry fell into the genres of epic, lyric, and didactic. His early poems were frequently imitations of foreign poets. He was also one of the translators who made Scandinavian and English poetry accessible to Germans, including Tennyson's Enoch Arden, Aylmers Field and Maud, and Esaias Tegnér's Axel. His reputation, however, was founded on his epic, Dreizehnlinden (1878). It enjoyed a wide circulation, and was arranged for the stage; composers Ludwig Bonvin and Maria Vespermann also set it to music. Weber was nicknamed 'Dreizehnlinden-Weber' after it.

His second work is his Goliath (1892). His Gedichte (1881) and Herbstblätter (1895) were published after his death. Other works include Marienblumen (1885), and two other religious poems written for special occasions, Vater unser and Das Leiden unseres Heilandes (1892).

== Sources ==
Attribution

- cites
  - Heinrich Keiter, Friedr. W. Weber, der Dichter von Dreizehnlinden (1884)
  - Julius Schwering, Friedr. W. Weber, sein Leben u. sein Werke (1900)
