= Guido Görres =

German Catholic historian, publicist and poet

Guido Görres (28 May 1805 – 14 July 1852) was a German Catholic historian, publicist and poet.

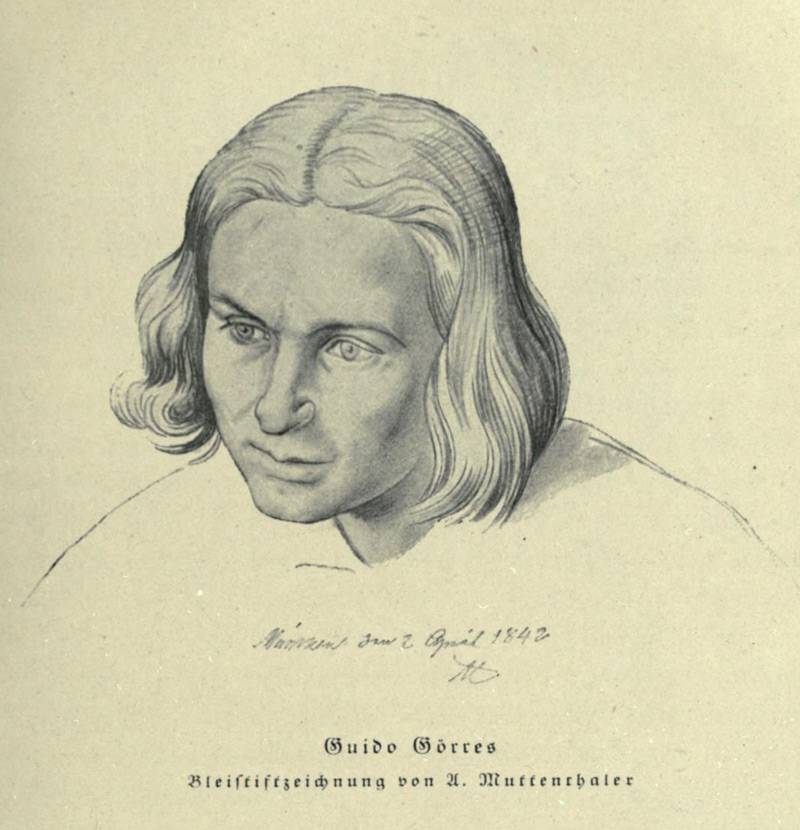
Guido Görres.

== Life ==
Born in Koblenz, he was the son of Joseph Görres, and made his early classical studies in his native town. During his father's banishment he went to Aarau and Strasburg to pursue his education. Reaching the University of Bonn in 1824, he devoted himself chiefly to the study of philology and history.

In Munich he continued his linguistic studies, and in 1830 received a prize from the French Academy. In the meantime (1827) his father had received a call as professor of history to Munich, and Guido, influenced by his father's lectures, took up history as his chief study.

In 1844 Görres married the composer and writer Maria Vespermann, who gave him three daughters. But his conjugal happiness was not to last more than eight years, for he died at Munich at the age of forty-seven years.

== Works ==
The fruits of Görres's historical studies were "Nikolaus von der Flüe" (Ratisbon, 1831) and "Die Jungfrau von Orleans" (Ratisbon, 1834) Nikolaus von der Flüe was the first critical historical investigation into the life of Nicholas. In doing research for his biography of Joan of Arc, he made a tour of investigation through France in search of material relating to the Maid of Orléans and became friends with Charles Forbes René de Montalembert.

Jointly with Count Franz Pocci, he published from 1834 to 1839 an illustrated serial on the festivals of the Church, the "Festkalender in Bildern und Liedern", the first illustrated magazine for the young in German. But before long his work took a different direction. He edited from 1838 the "Historisch-politische Blätter", a publication established to maintain the defense of the rights of the Catholic Church and to champion the Interests of German Catholics. Guido Görres took charge of the editorial management with George Phillips, and continued at this post until his death. It was widely influential, and kept German Catholics informed of events in the wider world Church.

At the same time his talents as a poet found expression in many beautiful compositions. He became one of the foremost lyricists among the modern Catholic poets of Germany. Under the influence of Clemens Brentano, with whom he was friends, Görres wrote late-Romantic fairy tales, sagas and legends, but above all poems (poems for children, spiritual Marian songs), some of which went into popular songs and were used in the church. In Rome in 1842, he wrote a collection of "Marienlieder" to celebrate Mary in the month of May.

The tale "Schön Röslein" (Munich, 1838), " Das Weihnaehtskripplein" (Schaflthausen, 1843), "Das Leben der hl. Cäcilia in drei Gesangen" (Munich, 1843), and the widely known and popular poems "Die Gottesfahrt nach Trier" (Coblenz, 1844), "Die arme Pilgerin zum hl. Rock" (Coblenz, 1845), the "Gedichte" (Munich, 1844), evince true art, deep perception and delicate tenderness, combined with power of conception and vigour of form. His work "Der hürnen Siegfried und sein Kampf mit dem Drachen" (The Heroic Life and Exploits of Siegfried the Dragon-Slayer) (Schaffhausen, 1843) was illustrated by Wilhelm von Kaulbach. In 1840, he wrote a detailed account of the Oberammergau Passion Play.

In 1846 he began with Count Pocci, as he had formerly done in the case of the Feast Calendar, the publication of an illustrated magazine called the "Deutsches Hausbuch", which however appeared for two years only. On the death of Brentano, Görres edited his "Märchen" (2 volumes, Stuttgart, 1846). He also produced an excellent German translation of "The Imitation of Christ" (St. Pölten, 1839, with illustrations by Steinle).
