= Liesborn Abbey =

Benedictine monastery

Coordinates: 51°42′35″N 8°15′22″E

- Kloster Liesborn
- Interactive map of Liesborn Abbey

Monastery information
- Order: Benedictine
- Denomination: Catholic
- Established: c. 815
- Disestablished: 1803
- Diocese: Münster

People
- Founders: Bozo and Bardo (probable)
- Abbot: Heinrich of Cleves, Johann Smalebecker, Anton Kalthoff, Gerlach Westhof
- Bishop: Egbert of Münster
- Important associated figures: Bernhard Witte, Master of Liesborn

Architecture
- Status: Dissolved
- Functional status: Historical Site
- Style: Gothic (rebuilt)
- Completion date: 1506 (rebuilt church)
- Closed: 1803

Site
- Location: Liesborn, Wadersloh, Germany
- Country: Germany
- Visible remains: Gothic church, monastic buildings

Liesborn Abbey (German: Kloster Liesborn) was a Benedictine monastery (originally for nuns or women's collegiate foundation) in Liesborn, in what was originally the Dreingau, now a part of Wadersloh in the district of Warendorf in North Rhine-Westphalia, Germany.

== History ==
The foundation of the monastery was traditionally ascribed to Charlemagne in 785. More probable however is a later date of 815, with two founders named Bozo and Bardo. At first Liesborn was a monastery of nuns or a women's collegiate foundation, but by the 12th century the community had grown so worldly that in 1131 Egbert, Bishop of Münster, expelled them, and replaced them by Benedictine monks.

The abbey was several times besieged by enemies. From the 13th century ascetic life steadily declined as the abbey increased in wealth, and the monastery, like very many other religious houses in Germany, became a secular college for the nobility. In 1298 the property of the abbey was divided unto separate prebends, twenty-two of them full prebends, and six for boys. Severely affected by the plague in the 14th century, the wealthy abbey nevertheless recovered.

However, in 1465 the abbey joined the reformist Bursfelde Congregation, which succeeded in restoring spiritual discipline and a more properly monastic way of life. Thanks to this influence, Liesborn was in a very healthy condition by the time of the distinguished abbots Heinrich of Cleves (1464–90) and Johann Smalebecker (1490–1522), who restored the buildings and greatly improved the economic state of the abbey. The zeal of Liesborn influenced other Benedictine abbeys, and it succeeded in re-establishing discipline and spiritual observance in several nunneries.

Also at this time the humanist Bernhard Witte was a monk here (from 1490 to about 1534) and wrote a history of Westphalia and a chronicle of the abbey.

The period of prosperity, however, did not last long. Abbot Anton Kalthoff (1522–32) adopted the doctrines of the Anabaptists and was deposed. Gerlach Westhof (1554–82) favoured the Protestants and involved the monastery heavily in debt. Conditions worsened during the wars of the 17th century. The Peace of Westphalia in 1648 brought a temporary improvement, but Liesborn suffered further during the wars of the 18th century, and by the time of the suppression was thousands of thalers in debt. The abbey was dissolved during secularisation on 2 May 1803 and was declared the property of the Prussian Crown.

The Gothic church, rebuilt between 1499 and 1506, and several of the monastic buildings, are still standing.

== Master of Liesborn ==
The beautiful paintings of the altar-piece by an unknown artist with which Abbot Heinrich adorned the church became famous, as the works of the Master of Liesborn, but under French administration in 1807 they were sold for almost nothing. The best of them are now in the National Gallery, London.
