= Joseph Görres =

German writer and philosopher (1776–1848)

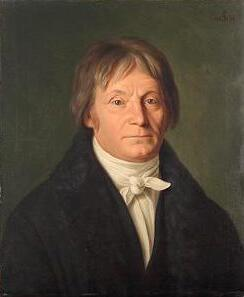
- Portrait of Görres, by Joseph Anton Settegast
- Born: Johann Joseph von Görres; 25 January 1776; Koblenz, Electorate of Trier
- Died: 29 January 1848 (aged 72); Munich, Kingdom of Bavaria
- Occupations: Publicist, writer, journalist, politician
- Spouse: Catherine de Lasaulx
- Children: Guido Görres, Maria Görres

Johann Joseph Görres, since 1839 von Görres (25 January 1776 – 29 January 1848), was a German writer, philosopher, theologian, historian and journalist.

== Early life ==
Görres was born in Koblenz. His father was moderately well off, and sent his son to a Latin college under the direction of the Jesuits. The young Görres' sympathies were initially with the French Revolution, and the French exiles in the Rhineland confirmed his beliefs, which would then evolve over time. He began a republican journal called Das rote Blatt, and afterwards Rübezahl, in which he strongly condemned the administration of the Rhenish provinces by France.

After the Treaty of Campo Formio (1797) there was hope that the Rhenish provinces would be constituted into an independent republic. He was one of several delegates sent by the Rhine and Moselle provinces to Paris in the fall of the year 1799, to protest against the conduct of the French general Leval in the Rhine country. The embassy reached Paris on 20 November 1799; two days before this Napoleon had assumed power. After much delay he received the embassy; but the only answer they obtained was "that they might rely on perfect justice, and that the French government would never lose sight of their wants". His stay in Paris cured him of his enthusiasm for the French Revolution, Görres on his return published a tract called Resultate meiner Sendung nach Paris, in which he gave his impressions.

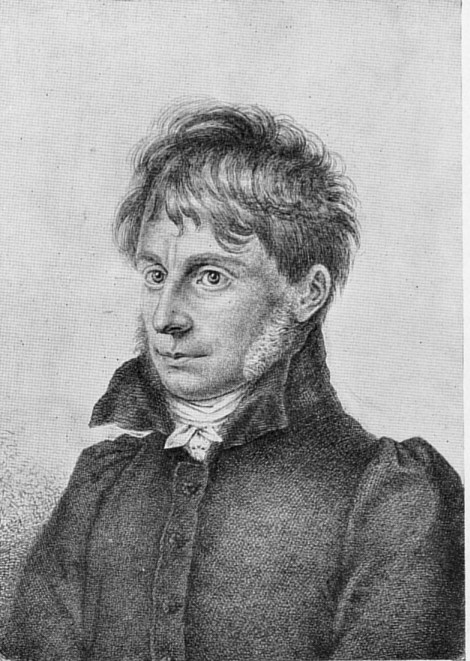
Lithograph of the young man by August Strixner, after a painting by Peter von Cornelius

During the thirteen years of Napoleon's dominion Görres lived a quiet life, devoting himself chiefly to art or science. In 1801 he married Catherine de Lasaulx, and for some years taught at a secondary school in Koblenz; in 1806 he moved to Heidelberg, where he lectured at the university. British lawyer and diarist Henry Crabb Robinson met Görres during this time. A quote from his diary:

Görres has the wildest physiognomy – looks like an overgrown old student. A faun-like nose and lips, fierce eyes, and locks as wild as Caliban's. Strong sense, with a sort of sulky indifference toward others, are the characteristics of his manner.

Clemens Brentano compared his appearance to that

[...] of an old lion shaking and pulling his mane caught in the bars of his cage.

As a leading member of the Heidelberg Romantic group, he edited together with Brentano and Ludwig Achim von Arnim the Zeitung für Einsiedler (subsequently renamed Trost-Einsamkeit), and in 1807 he published Die deutschen Volksbücher (literally The German Folk Books).

He returned to Koblenz in 1808, and again found occupation as a teacher in a secondary school, supported by civic funds. He now studied Persian, and in two years published a Mythengeschichte der asiatischen Welt (History of the Myths of the Asiatic World), which was followed ten years later by Das Heldenbuch von Iran (The Book of Heroes of Iran), a translation of part of the Shahnama, the epic of Firdousi.

== Editor of the Merkur ==
In 1813 he again took up the cause of national independence, and in the following year founded Der rheinische Merkur. The outspokenness of its hostility to Napoleon made it influential, and Napoleon himself called it "a fifth power". It campaigned for a united Germany, with a representative government, but under an emperor, Görres having abandoned his earlier advocacy of republicanism. When Napoleon was at Elba, Görres wrote an ironic imaginary proclamation issued by him to the people. He criticised the second peace of Paris (1815), declaring that Alsace and Lorraine should have been demanded back from France.

Stein used the Merkur at the time of the meeting of the congress of Vienna to give expression to his hopes. But Hardenberg, in May 1815, warned Görres to remember that he was not to arouse hostility against France, but only against Napoleon. There was also in the Merkur a demand for a constitution for Prussia, expression of the desire that an Austrian prince should assume the imperial title, and also a tendency to liberalism—all distasteful to Hardenberg, and to his master Friedrich Wilhelm III. Görres disregarded warnings sent to him by the censorship, so that the Merkur was suppressed early in 1816, at the instance of the Prussian government; and soon after Görres was dismissed from his teaching post.

== Life as an independent writer ==
He went back to Heidelberg, but in 1817 returned to Coblenz and founded a relief-society for the alleviation of distress in the Rhenish province. At the same time he continued his work as a political pamphleteer, as shown chiefly in his "Adresse der Stadt und Landschaft Koblenz und ihre Uebergabe beim Fürsten Hardenberg" (1818) and his brochure "Teutschland und die Revolution" (1819). In this work he reviewed the circumstances which had led to the murder of August von Kotzebue, and, while expressing horror at the deed itself, he urged that it was impossible and undesirable to repress the free utterance of public opinion. The success of the work was marked, despite a ponderous style. It was suppressed by the Prussian government, which confiscated his papers and ordered his arrest. He escaped, however, to Frankfurt, whence he made his way to Strasbourg.

Two more political tracts were Europa und die Revolution ("Europe and the Revolution", 1821) and In Sachen der Rheinprovinzen und in eigener Angelegenheit ("In the matter of the Rhine Province and in a matter of my own", 1822). In the former book – read with avidity throughout Germany – Görres describes the moral, intellectual and political corruption of France in the course of the eighteenth century as the major cause which led to the revolution:

"The public morals, corrupted as they were from the high to the lower classes of society, abjured the aid of the clergy: in the dissolution of all the principles of justice and morality, nought remained unconsumed, save the consuming power itself — wit, which now not as a creative, but as a destroying spirit, brooded over the abyss. The literati, who had formerly gone to court, now, after having there finished their schooling, turned to the people and preached to them another doctrine — of the God who resided in matter, of the Heaven to be found in the senses, of morality that consisted in cunning, and of the felicity that voluptuous indulgence afforded; and that all beside was the vain deception and jugglery of priests, whether at court or in the Church. That warm genial view of the Middle Age, which, in the same way as antiquity gave life to mountains, springs, and trees, looked on the state in all its members and parts as a thing endued with vitality, and procured for them, as so many essential personalities, love and attachment; that warm ennobling view had long since passed away. In room of this, the doctrine of political materialism had descended from the high to the lower regions of society, and for warm life had substituted cold abstractions, cyphers, and rigid geometrical forms, which cut sharply into private life; and for such dead abstractions it was impossible to feel affection. The portion of the nobility that sank into degeneracy at court, incurred the contempt of the people. The better part, who residing on their estates, still cultivated many ancient virtues, were, as holding extensive landed possessions in the face of grinding poverty, objects of hatred; and their consideration was undermined by the arrogance and ever increasing wealth of the monied class. Thus all bonds were relaxed, in proportion as the inward expansion of all relations increased. Authority sometimes, with a good-natured imprudence, assisted in the destruction; sometimes terrified, struggled against it in impotent opposition, by means of her police and bastilles, and then again sent her armies over the Atlantic, in order to visit in America the school of freedom. Thus all was prepared for the stroke; and when the same want of money, which through the indulgencies had led to the Reformation, necessitated the convocation of the three estates, the Revolution broke out."

— Joseph Görres, "Europe and the Revolution", 1821

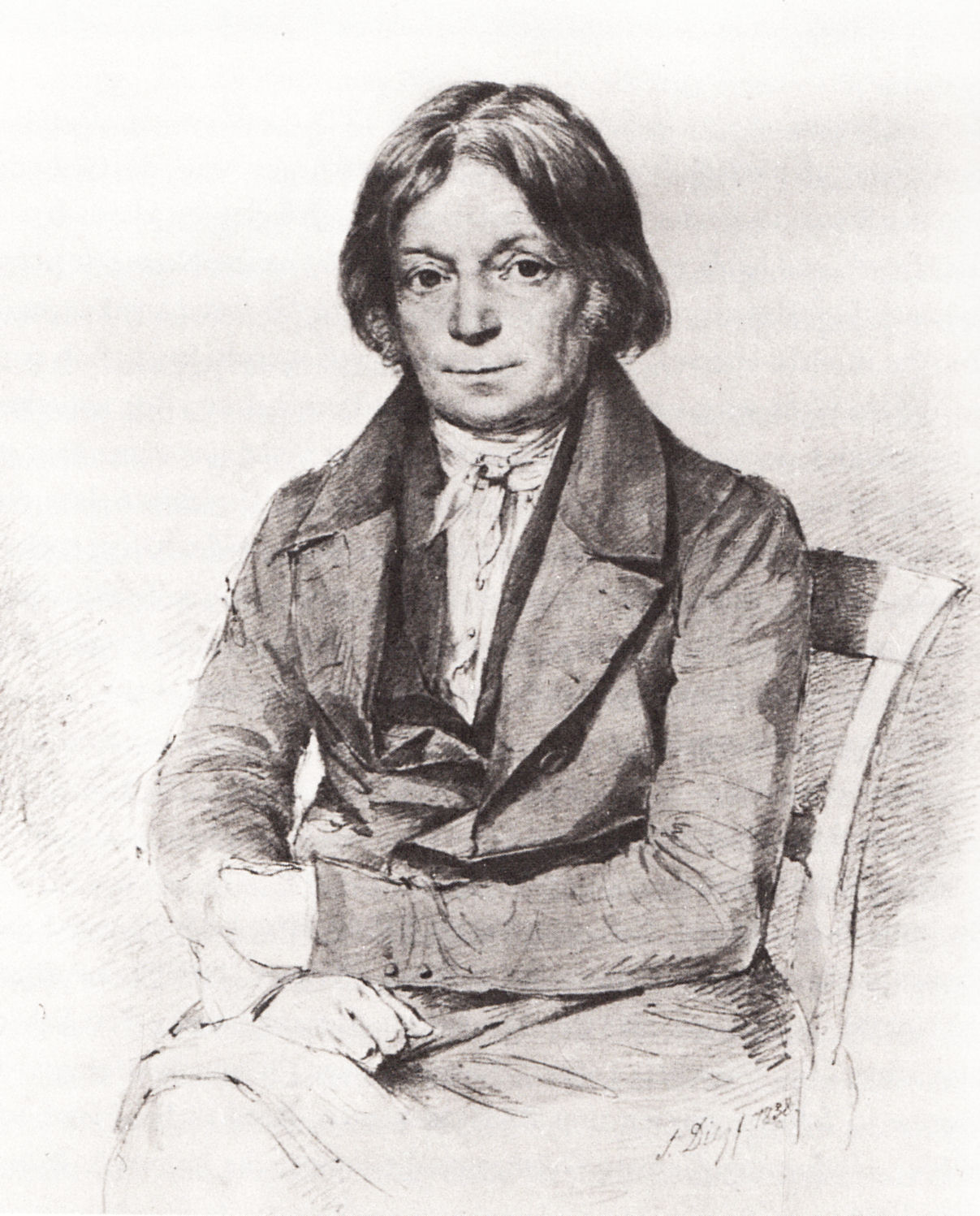
Joseph Görres in 1838, drawing by F. Diez

In his pamphlet Die heilige Allianz und die Völker auf dem Congresse von Verona ("The Holy Alliance and the peoples represented at the congress of Verona", 1822), Görres asserted that the princes had met together to crush the liberties of the people, and that the people must look elsewhere for help. The "elsewhere" was to Rome; and from this time Görres became an Ultramontane writer. In 1826, he was summoned to Munich by King Ludwig of Bavaria as professor of history in the university, and there his writing enjoyed popularity. There he was visited by Brentano, Lacordaire, Lamennais, and Montalembert.

Since his sojourn in Strasbourg, Görres had studied the mystic testimonies of various epochs. He went into the mystical writers of the Middle Ages such as María de Ágreda as well as observing, partly in person, the ecstatic young women of his time (Maria von Mörl, and others), and strove to comprehend more thoroughly the nature of Christian mysticism. His Christliche Mystik ("On christian mysticism", 4 vols., 1836–1842; 2nd ed., 5 vols., 1879) gave a series of biographies of the saints, together with an exposition of Roman Catholic mysticism. But his most celebrated ultramontane work was a polemical one. Its occasion was the deposition and imprisonment by the Prussian government of the archbishop Clement Wenceslaus reportedly due to his refusal to sanction in certain instances the marriages of Protestants and Roman Catholics.

In his Athanasius (1837), Görres upheld the power of the church. Athanasius went through several editions, and initiated a long and bitter controversy. In the Historisch-politische Blätter ("Historical-political pages"), a Munich journal, Görres and his son Guido (1805–1852) continued to uphold the claims of the church. On New Year's Day of 1839, Görres received the "Civil Order of Merit" from the king for his services.

== Death ==
He died on 29 January 1848, the year of the fall of Metternich, and was buried in the Alter Südfriedhof in Munich.

== Publications ==
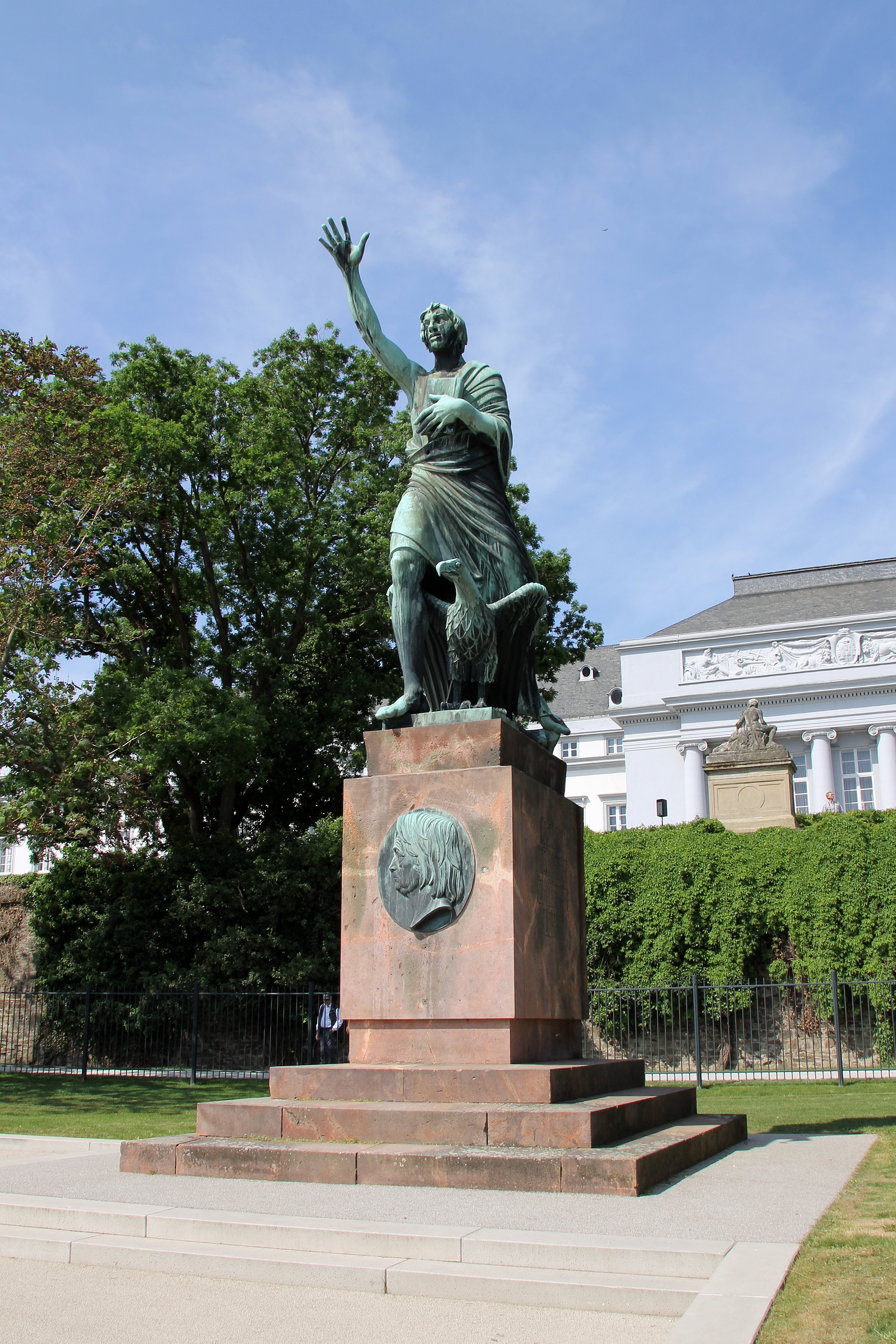
Joseph-Görres-Memorial in Koblenz

- Der allgemeine Frieden, ein Ideal (1798).
- Aphorismen über Kunst (1802).
- Glauben und Wissen (1805).
- Die teutschen Volksbücher. Nähere Würdigung der schönen Historien-, Wetter- und Arzneybüchlein […] (1807).
- Schriftproben von Peter Hammer (1808).
- Über den Fall Teutschlands und die Bedingungen seiner Wiedergeburt (1810).
- Mythengeschichte der asiatischen Welt (1810).
- Lohengrin, ein altteutsches Gedicht (1813).
- Rheinischer Merkur (1814–1816).
- Teutschland und die Revolution (1819).
- Beantwortung der in den jetzigen Zeiten für jeden Teutschen besonders wichtigen Frage: Was haben wir zu erwarten? (1814).
- Europa und die Revolution (1821).
- Firdusi (1822).
- Die heilige Allianz und die Völker auf dem Congresse von Verona (1822).
- Introduction to Melchior von Diepenbrock's Heinrich Susos, genannt Amandus, Leben und Schriften (1829).
- Über die Grundlage, Gliederung und Zeitenfolge der Weltgeschichte (1830).
- Nachruf auf Achim von Arnim (1831).
- Vier Sendschreiben an Herrn Culmann, Sekretär der Ständeversammlung (1831).
- Ministerium, Staatszeitung, Rechte und Unrechte Mitte (1831).
- Athanasius (1837).
- Die Triarier H. Leo, Dr. P. Marheinecke, D. K. Bruno (1838).
- Die christliche Mystik (1836–1842).
- Kirche und Staat nach Ablauf der Cölner Irrung (1842).
- Der Dom von Köln und das Münster von Strasburg (1842).
- Introduction to Das Leben Christi, by Johann Nepomuk Sepp (1843).
- Die Japhetiden und ihre gemeinsame Heimat Armenien. Akademische Festrede (1844).
- Die drei Grundwurzeln des celtischen Stammes und ihre Einwanderung (1845).
- Die Wallfahrt nach Trier (1845).
- Die Aspecten an der Zeitenwende. Zum neuen Jahre 1848 (last and unfinished article, 1848).

=== Works in English translation ===
- Germany and the Revolution. London: Longman, Hurst, Rees, Orme, and Brown, 1820.

== Influences ==
- Richard Wagner was an avid reader of Görres' Lohengrin introduction, since the 1840s, as well as (less enthusiastically) of the Christliche Mystik (read in 1875).
- Carl Jung mentions reading Görres as a young man in his autobiography, Memories, Dreams, Reflections (Pantheon Books, 1963, p. 99) ISBN 0-679-72395-1.
- The Görres Society was founded on 25 January 1876 in honour of Görres to advance Roman Catholic studies.

== See also ==
- Guido Görres
