= Somatic cell count =

Count of cells, usually to detect mastitis and thus to assess milk quality

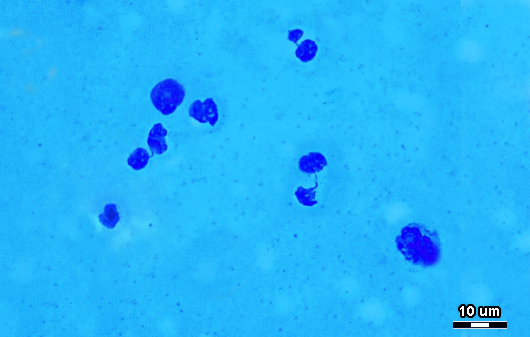
Somatic cells stained with Newman-Lampert Lewovitz-Weber solution (ISO 13366-1/2008)

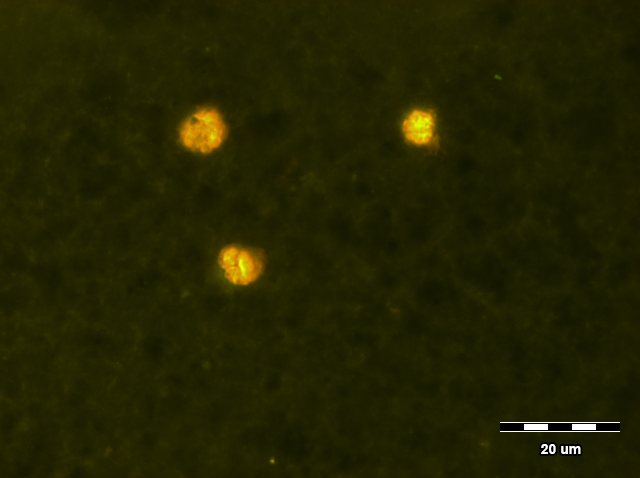
Somatic cells stained with ethidium bromide (ISO 13366-1/1997)

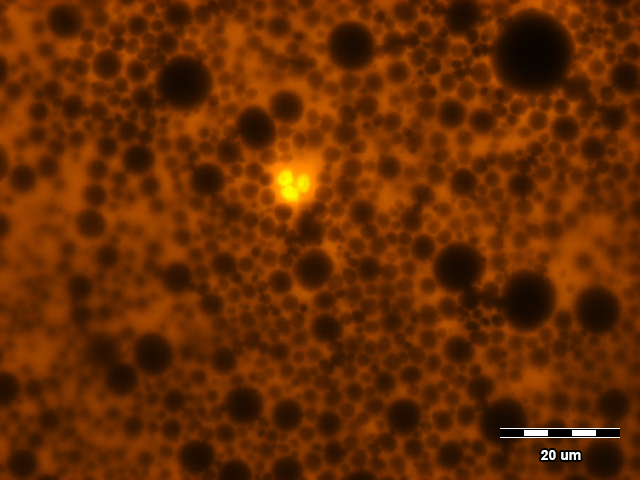
Polymorfonuclear leukocyte stained with ethidium bromide (ISO 13366-1/2008)

A somatic cell count (SCC) is a cell count of somatic cells in a fluid specimen, usually milk. In dairying, the SCC is an indicator of the quality of milk—specifically, its low likeliness to contain harmful bacteria, and thus its high food safety. White blood cells (leukocytes) constitute the majority of somatic cells in question. The number of somatic cells increases in response to pathogenic bacteria like Staphylococcus aureus, a cause of mastitis. The SCC is quantified as cells per milliliter. General agreement rests on a reference range of less than 100,000 cells/mL for uninfected cows and greater than 250,000 for cows infected with significant pathogen levels. Several tests like the Bartovation SCC cow’s milk test and The California mastitis test provide a cow-side measure of somatic cell count. The somatic cell count in the milk also increases after calving when colostrum is produced.

== Bacteria plate count ==
The methods of determining Grade A milk quality are well established, and are based on the somatic cell count and the bacteria plate count. Generally a lower somatic cell count indicates better animal health, while the bacteria plate count indicates improved equipment sanitation.

Somatic cells originate only from inside the animal's udder, while the bacteria are usually from external contaminations, such as insufficient cleaning of the milk transport equipment or insufficient external cleansing of the cow's udder and teats prior to milking. Milking equipment can also be accidentally knocked or kicked off an animal onto the floor, and contaminants on the barn floor can be sucked into the milk line by the system vacuum. A filter sock or filter disk in the pipeline prevents large particulate contaminants from entering the milk bulk tank, but cannot remove bacterial contamination once it has occurred.

For example, as defined by the State of Indiana administrative code, grade A milk shall meet the following standards:

- The bacterial estimate classification shall be "acceptable".
- The bacteria count using the standard plate count, direct microscopic count, or plate loop count methods shall be not more than one million (1,000,000) bacteria per milliliter.
- The somatic cell count shall be not more than one million (1,000,000) cells per milliliter.
- The milk shall not contain drug residues.

Milk not meeting these standards shall be designated as undergrade. Undergrade milk may not be sold for human consumption or processing into products for human consumption.

As established, these measurements are taken daily from the milk bulk tank and not from individual cows. This is because testing of individual animals at each milking would be expensive, but it also means that milk from a sick cow is diluted and averaged down by the healthy animals. Recently technological advances have allowed the dairy producer to test animals individually for SCC at every milking. The huge bulk tanks at large farms are accommodating of more sick animals in the herd, without the sick animals affecting the overall milk quality rating. However many different state and governmental agencies (including FDA) inspect each load of milk delivered to the processing facility as well as the processing facilities themselves to ensure that all milk processed through those facilities is safe for all consumers.

As discussed in the paper Guidelines for Using the DHI Somatic Cell Count Program:

- The results of many studies suggest that cows with SCC of less than 200,000 are not likely to be infected with major mastitis pathogens, but cows with SCC above 300,000 are probably infected (Smith, 1996).
- Herds with bulk tank SCC above 200,000 will have varying degrees of subclinical mastitis present. Data from the National Mastitis Council (1987) show that 6% of the [udder] quarters in a herd could be expected to be infected in a herd with a bulk tank SCC of 200,000.
- At 500,000 SCC, 16% of the quarters may be infected with a 6% reduction in milk production compared to a SCC of 200,000.

In Canada, European Union, Australia, New Zealand, Switzerland, and some US states (e.g., Washington) the somatic cell count shall be not more than 400,000 cells per milliliter. The somatic cell count limit is 750,000 in the majority of the USA and 1,000,000 in Brazil.

Bacteria in milk can come from sources other than the animal. Over time the milking pipeline and equipment can become coated with residues such as milkstone which are not removed by standard detergents and require periodic flushing of equipment with high strength corrosives. Automatic washing equipment for the bulk tank may not effectively clean all interior surfaces, and does not clean the exterior of the bulk tank at all.

Milk processors and co-ops purchasing milk routinely award farmers for having the lowest possible SCC counts via "quality bonuses" added to each milk payment to the dairyman.

== See also ==
- Mastitis in dairy cattle
- Breed method
