= Dairy farming =

Long-term production of milk

A dairy farmer prepares cows for milking at a modern dairy facility in Highgate Center, Vermont.

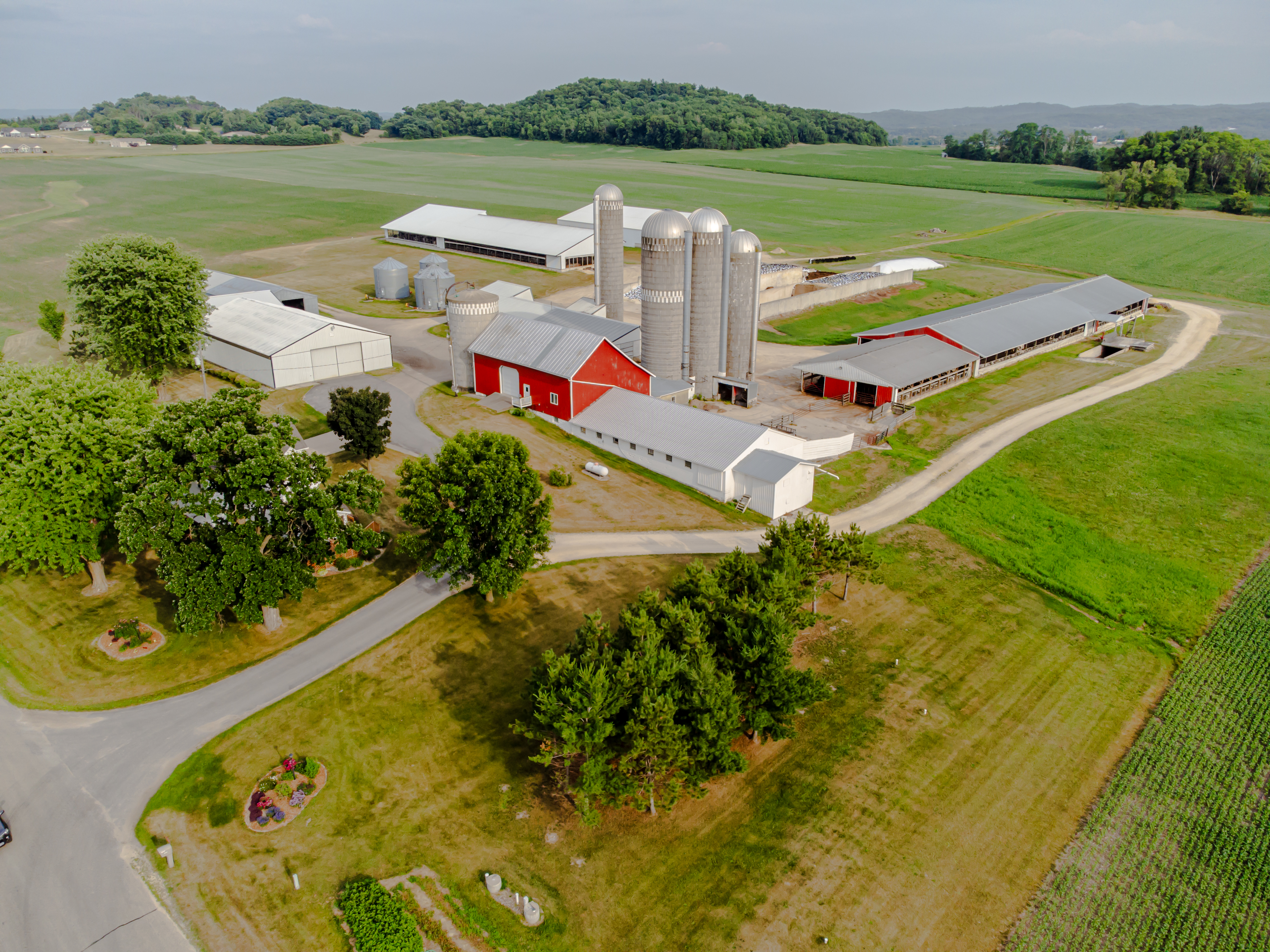
Dairy farm near Bangor, Wisconsin

Dairy farming is a class of agriculture for the long-term production of milk, which is processed (either on the farm or at a dairy plant, either of which may be called a dairy) for the eventual sale of a dairy product. Dairy farming has a history that goes back to the early Neolithic era, around the seventh millennium BC, in many regions of Europe and Africa. Before the 20th century, milking was done by hand on small farms. Beginning in the early 20th century, milking was done in large scale dairy farms with innovations including rotary parlors, the milking pipeline, and automatic milking systems that were commercially developed in the early 1990s.

Milk preservation methods have improved starting with the arrival of refrigeration technology in the late 19th century, which included direct expansion refrigeration and the plate heat exchanger. These cooling methods allowed dairy farms to preserve milk by reducing spoiling due to bacterial growth and humidity.

Worldwide, leading dairy industries in many countries including India, the United States, China, and New Zealand serve as important producers, exporters, and importers of milk. Since the late 20th century, there has generally been an increase in total milk production worldwide, with around 827,884,000 tonnes of milk being produced in 2017 according to the FAO.

There has been substantial concern over the amount of waste output created by dairy industries, seen through manure disposal and air pollution caused by methane gas. The industry's role in agricultural greenhouse gas emissions has also been noted to implicate environmental consequences. Various measures have been put in place in order to control the amount of phosphorus excreted by dairy livestock. The usage of rBST has also been controversial. Dairy farming in general has been criticized by animal welfare activists due to the health issues imposed upon dairy cows through intensive animal farming.

== Common types ==
Although any mammal can produce milk, commercial dairy farms are typically one-species enterprises. In developed countries, dairy farms typically consist of high producing dairy cows. Other species used in commercial dairy farming include goats, sheep, water buffaloes, and camels. In Italy, donkey dairies are growing in popularity to produce an alternative milk source for human infants.

== History ==
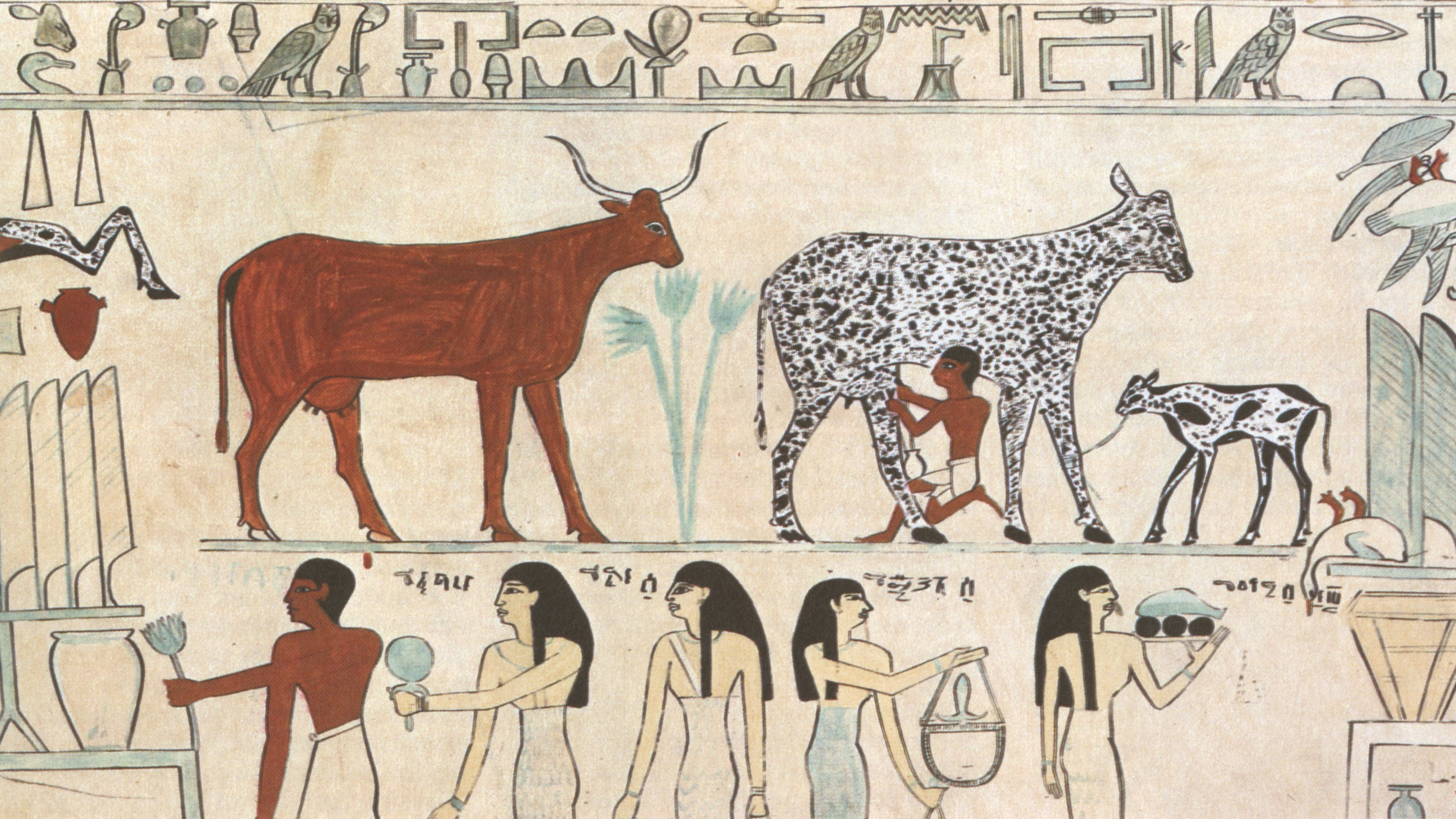
Milking cattle in ancient Egypt

While cattle were domesticated as early as 12,000 years ago as a food source and as beasts of burden, the earliest evidence of using domesticated cows for dairy production is from the seventh millennium BC – the early Neolithic era – in northwestern Anatolia. Dairy farming developed elsewhere in the world in subsequent centuries: the sixth millennium BC in eastern Europe, the fifth millennium BC in Africa, and the fourth millennium BC in Britain and Northern Europe.

In the last century or so larger farms specialising in dairy alone have emerged. Large scale dairy farming is only viable where either a large amount of milk is required for production of more durable dairy products such as cheese, butter, etc. or there is a substantial market of people with money to buy milk, but no cows of their own. In the 1800s, economist Johann Heinrich von Thünen argued that there was about a 100-mile radius surrounding a city where such fresh milk supply was economically viable.

=== Hand milking ===
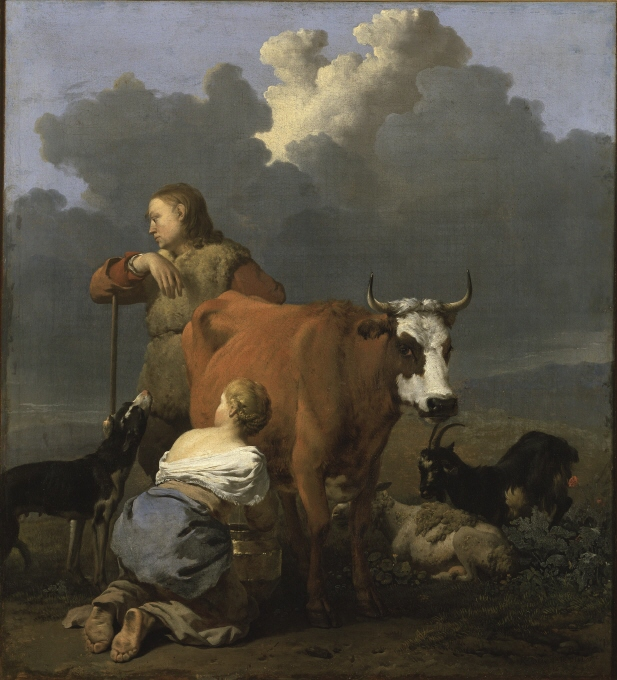
Woman hand milking a cow

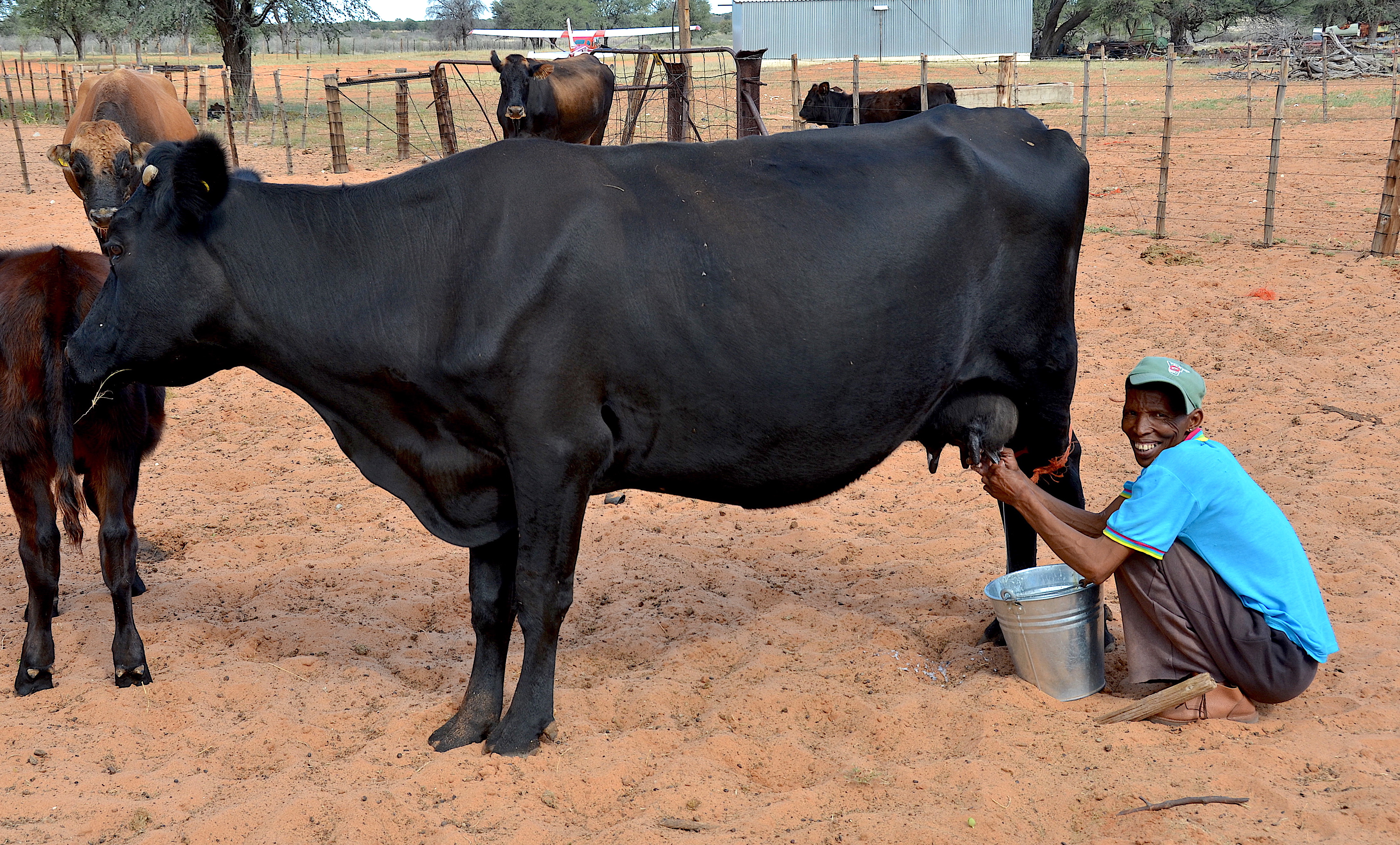
Hand milking on a farm in Namibia

Centralized dairy farming as we understand it primarily developed around villages and cities, where residents were unable to have cows of their own due to a lack of grazing land. Near the town, farmers could make some extra money on the side by having additional animals and selling the milk in town. The dairy farmers would fill barrels with milk in the morning and bring it to market on a wagon. Until the late 19th century, the milking of the cow was done by hand. In the United States, several large dairy operations existed in some northeastern states and in the west, that involved as many as several hundred cows, but an individual milker could not be expected to milk more than a dozen cows a day. Smaller operations predominated.

For most herds, milking took place indoors twice a day, in a barn with the cattle tied by the neck with ropes or held in place by stanchions. Feeding could occur simultaneously with milking in the barn, although most dairy cattle were pastured during the day between milkings. Such examples of this method of dairy farming are difficult to locate, but some are preserved as a historic site for a glimpse into the days gone by. One such instance that is open for this is at Point Reyes National Seashore.

Dairy farming has been part of agriculture for thousands of years. Historically it has been one part of small, diverse farms. In the last century or so larger farms concentrating on dairy production emerged. Large scale dairy farming is only viable where either a large amount of milk is required for production of more durable dairy products such as cheese, butter, etc. or there is a substantial market of people with cash to buy milk, but no cows of their own. Dairy farms were the best way to meet demand.

=== Vacuum bucket milking ===
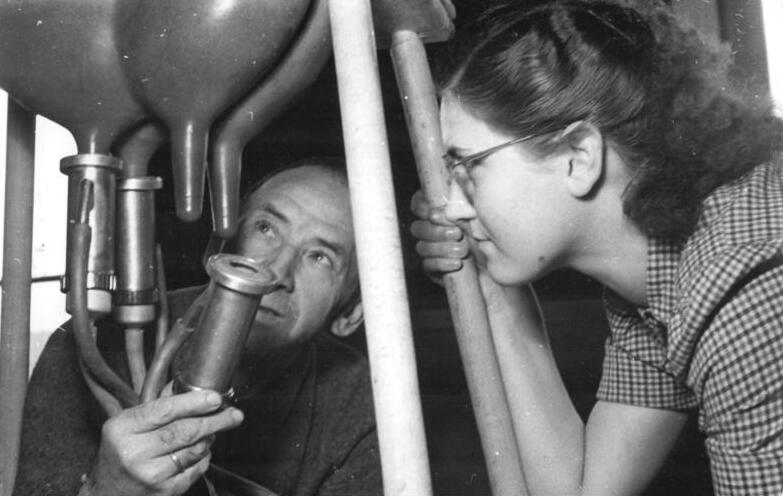
Demonstration of a new Soviet milker device. East Germany, 1952

The first milking machines were an extension of the traditional milking pail. The early milker device fit on top of a regular milk pail and sat on the floor under the cow. Following each cow being milked, the bucket would be dumped into a holding tank. These were introduced in the early 20th century.

This developed into the Surge hanging milker. Prior to milking a cow, a large wide leather strap called a surcingle was put around the cow, across the cow's lower back. The milker device and collection tank hung underneath the cow from the strap. This innovation allowed the cow to move around naturally during the milking process rather than having to stand perfectly still over a bucket on the floor.

=== Milking pipeline ===
The next innovation in automatic milking was the milk pipeline, introduced in the late 20th century. This uses a permanent milk-return pipe and a second vacuum pipe that encircles the barn or milking parlor above the rows of cows, with quick-seal entry ports above each cow. By eliminating the need for the milk container, the milking device shrank in size and weight to the point where it could hang under the cow, held up only by the sucking force of the milker nipples on the cow's udder. The milk is pulled up into the milk-return pipe by the vacuum system, and then flows by gravity to the milkhouse vacuum-breaker that puts the milk in the storage tank. The pipeline system greatly reduced the physical labor of milking since the farmer no longer needed to carry around huge heavy buckets of milk from each cow.

The pipeline allowed barn length to keep increasing and expanding, but after a point farmers started to milk the cows in large groups, filling the barn with one-half to one-third of the herd, milking the animals, and then emptying and refilling the barn. As herd sizes continued to increase, this evolved into the more efficient milking parlor.

=== Milking parlors ===
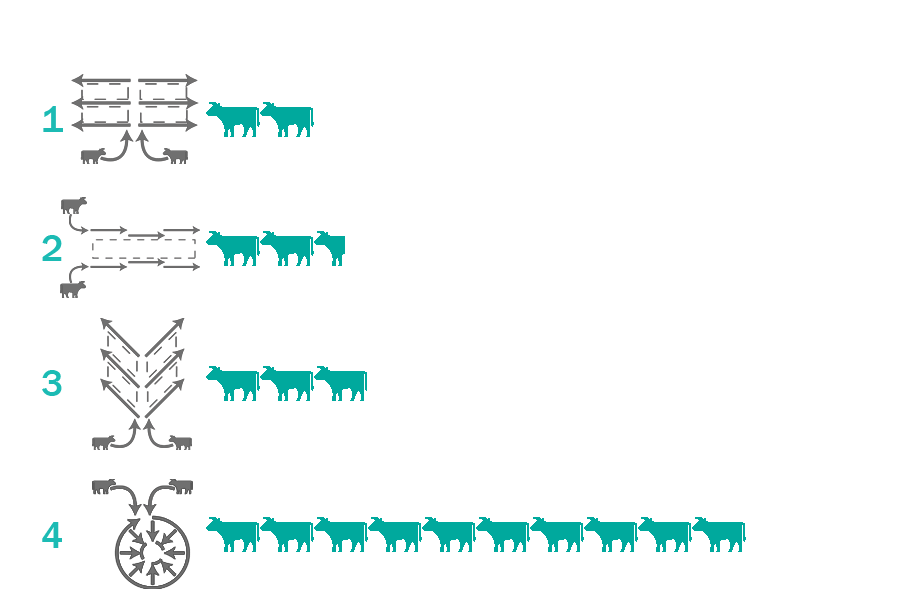
Efficiency of four different milking parlors.: 1. Bali-Style 50 cows/h; 2. Swingover 60 cows/h; 3. Herringbone 75 cows/h; 4. Rotary 250 cows/h

Innovation in milking focused on mechanizing the milking parlor (known in Australia and New Zealand as the 'cowshed') to maximize the number of cows per operator which streamlined the milking process to permit cows to be milked as if on an assembly line, and to reduce physical stresses on the farmer by putting the cows on a platform slightly above the person milking the cows to eliminate having to constantly bend over. Many older and smaller farms still have tie-stall or stanchion barns, but worldwide a majority of commercial farms have parlors.

==== Herringbone and parallel parlors ====
In herringbone and parallel parlors, the milker generally milks one row at a time. The milker moves a row of cows from the holding yard into the milking parlor, and milks each cow in that row. Once all of the milking machines have been removed from the milked row, the milker releases the cows to their feed. A new group of cows is then loaded into the now vacant side and the process repeats until all cows are milked. Depending on the size of the milking parlor, which normally is the bottleneck, these rows of cows can range from four to sixty at a time. The benefits of a herringbone parlour are easy maintenance, durability, stability, and improved safety for animals and humans when compared to tie stall. The first herringbone shed is thought to have been built in 1952 by a Gordonton farmer.

==== Rotary parlors ====
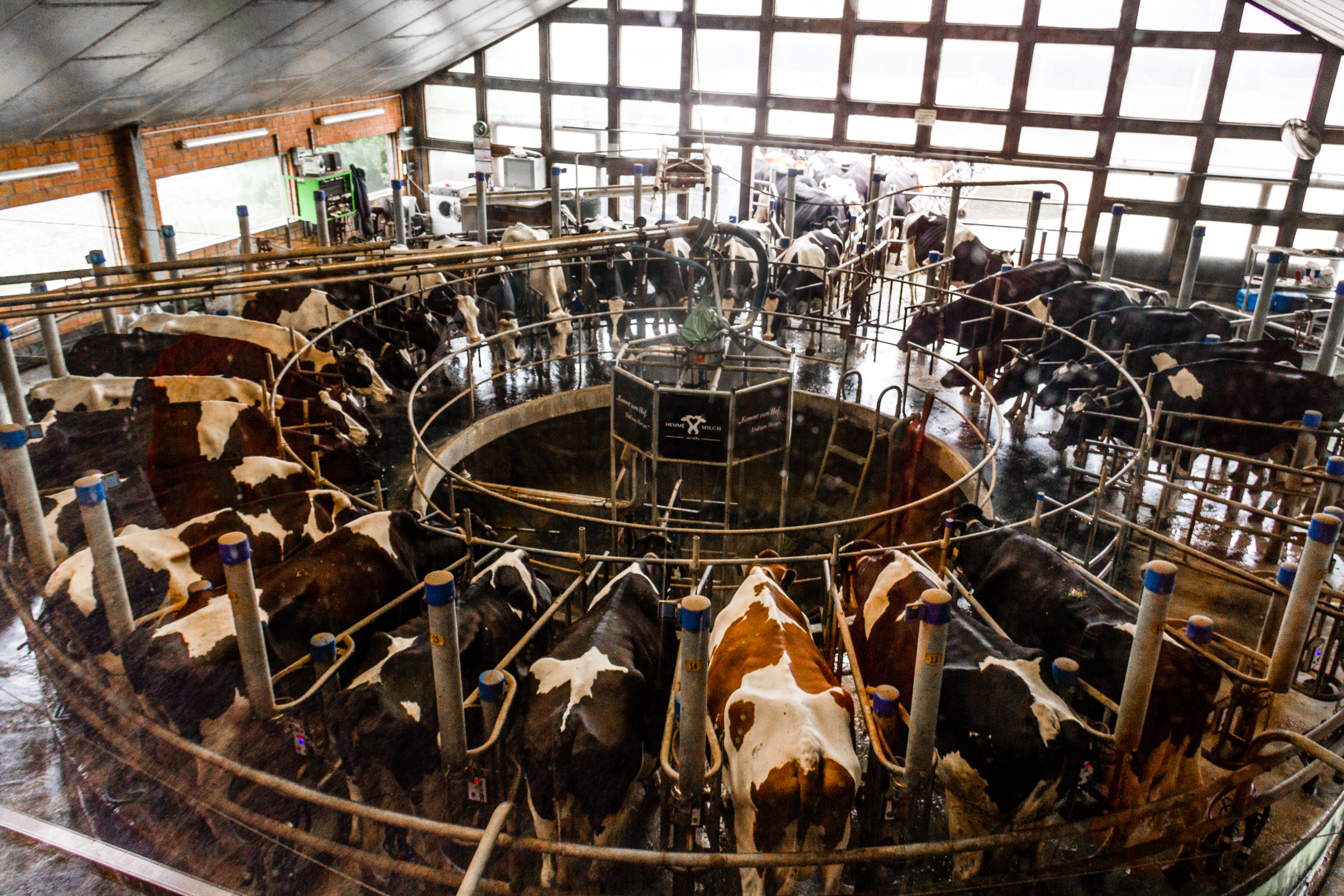
Rotary milking parlor

In rotary parlors, the cows are loaded one at a time onto the parlor as it rotates in a circle. One milker stands near the entry to the parlor and pre-dips the teats on the udder to help prevent bacteria from entering. The next milker puts the machine on the cow to begin milking. By the time the platform has completed almost a full rotation, the cow is done milking and the unit will come off automatically. The last milker will post-dip her teats to protect them before entering back into the pen. Once this process is done, the cow will back out of the parlor and return to the barn. Rotary cowsheds, as they are called in New Zealand, started in the 1980s but are expensive compared to Herringbone cowshed – the older New Zealand norm.

=== Automatic milker take-off ===
It can be harmful to an animal for it to be over-milked past the point where the udder has stopped releasing milk. Consequently, the milking process involves not just applying the milker, but also monitoring the process to determine when the animal has been milked out and the milker should be removed. While parlor operations allowed a farmer to milk many more animals much more quickly, it also increased the number of animals to be monitored simultaneously by the farmer. The automatic take-off system was developed to remove the milker from the cow when the milk flow reaches a preset level, relieving the farmer of the duties of carefully watching over 20 or more animals being milked at the same time.

=== Fully automated robotic milking ===
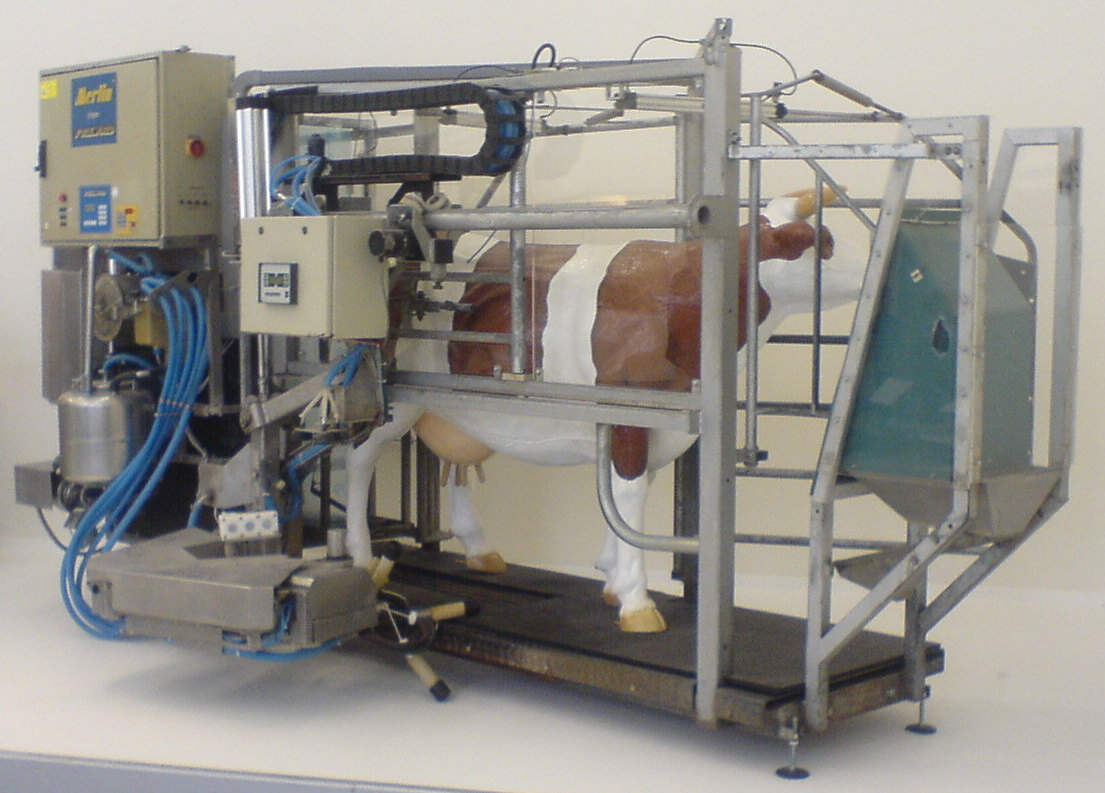
An automatic milking system unit as an exhibit at a museum

In the 1980s and 1990s, robotic milking systems were developed and introduced (principally in the EU). Thousands of these systems are now in routine operation. In these systems the cow has a high degree of autonomy to choose her time of milking freely during the day (some alternatives may apply, depending on cow-traffic solution used at a farm level). These systems are generally limited to intensively managed systems although research continues to match them to the requirements of grazing cattle and to develop sensors to detect animal health and fertility automatically. Every time the cow enters the milking unit she is fed concentrates and her collar is scanned to record production data.

== History of milk preservation methods ==
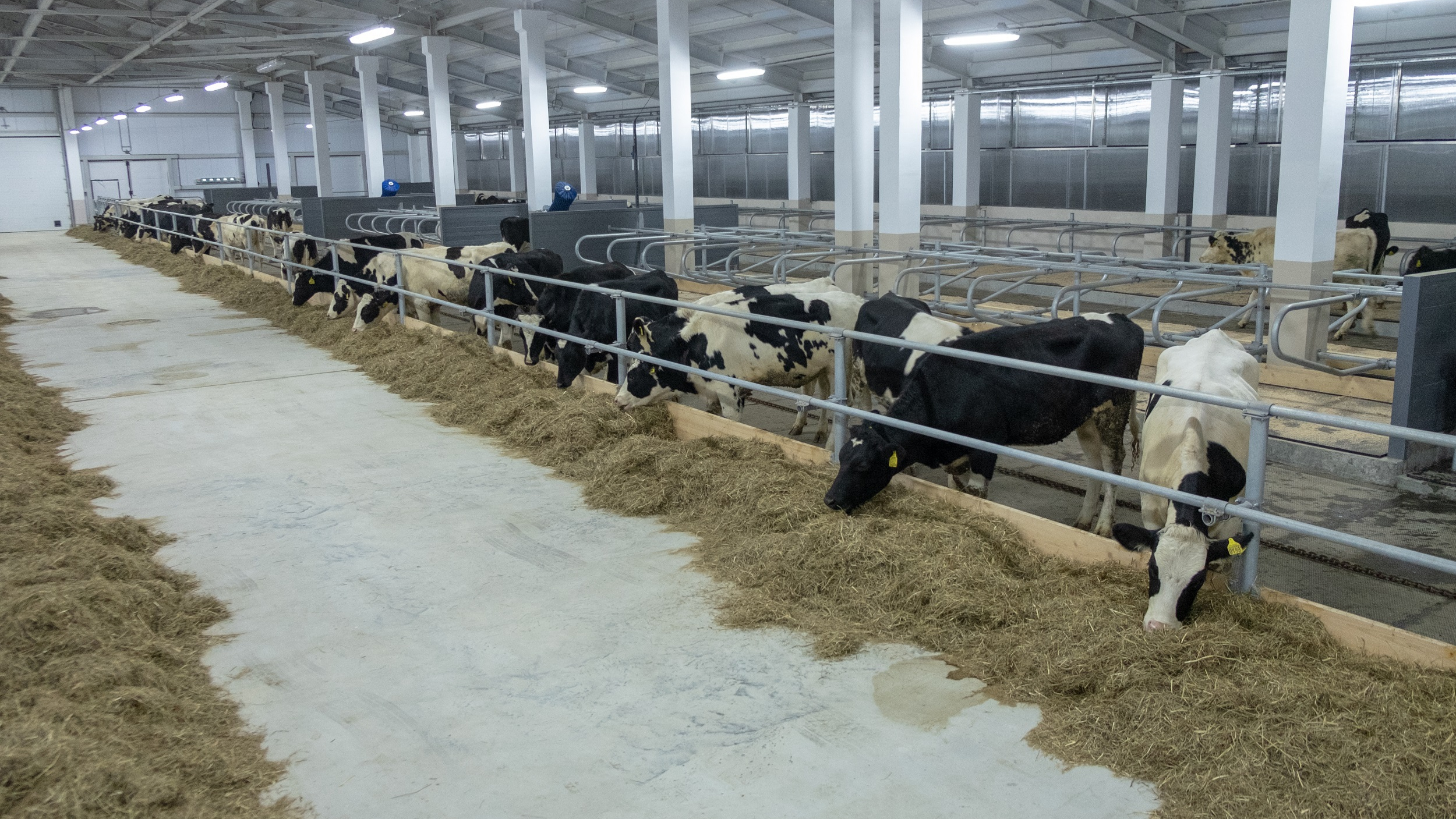
Modern barn on Sakhalin Island

Cool temperature has been the main method by which milk freshness has been extended. When windmills and well pumps were invented, one of their first uses on the farm, besides providing water for animals themselves, was for cooling milk, to extend its storage life, until it would be transported to the town market.

The naturally cold underground water would be continuously pumped into a cooling tub or vat. Tall, ten-gallon metal containers filled with freshly obtained milk, which is naturally warm, were placed in this cooling bath. This method of milk cooling was popular before the arrival of electricity and refrigeration.

=== Refrigeration ===
Refrigeration was initially used to cool cans of milk, which were filled by hand milking. These cans were placed into a cooled water bath to remove heat and keep them cool until they were able to be transported to collection facilities. As more automated milking methods were developed, hand milking was replaced and, as a result, the milk can was replaced by a bulk milk cooler. The first type of bulk milk coolers were ice banks – double-walled vessels with evaporator coils and water located between the walls at the bottom and sides of the tank. A small refrigeration compressor was used to remove heat from the evaporator coils. Ice eventually builds up around the coils, until it reaches a thickness of about three inches surrounding each pipe, and the cooling system shuts off. When the milking operation starts, only the milk agitator and the water circulation pump, which flows water across the ice and the steel walls of the tank, are needed to reduce the incoming milk to a temperature below 5 °C (41 °F).

This cooling method worked well for smaller dairies, however was fairly inefficient and was unable to meet the increasingly higher cooling demand of larger milking parlors. In the mid-1950s direct expansion refrigeration was first applied directly to the bulk milk cooler. This type of cooling utilizes an evaporator built directly into the inner wall of the storage tank to remove heat from the milk. Direct expansion is able to cool milk at a much faster rate than early ice bank type coolers and is still the primary method for bulk tank cooling today on small to medium-sized operations.

Another device which has contributed significantly to milk quality is the plate heat exchanger (PHE). This device utilizes a number of specially designed stainless steel plates with small spaces between them. Milk is passed between every other set of plates with water being passed between the balance of the plates to remove heat from the milk. This method of cooling can remove large amounts of heat from the milk in a very short time, thus drastically slowing bacteria growth and thereby improving milk quality. Ground water is the most common source of cooling medium for this device. Dairy cows consume approximately 3 gallons of water for every gallon of milk production and prefer to drink slightly warm water as opposed to cold ground water. For this reason, PHE's can result in drastically improved milk quality, reduced operating costs for the dairymen by reducing the refrigeration load on his bulk milk cooler, and increased milk production by supplying the cows with a source of fresh warm water.

Plate heat exchangers have also evolved as a result of the increase of dairy farm herd sizes in the United States. As a dairyman increases the size of his herd, he must also increase the capacity of his milking parlor in order to harvest the additional milk. This increase in parlor sizes has resulted in tremendous increases in milk throughput and cooling demand. Today's larger farms produce milk at a rate which direct expansion refrigeration systems on bulk milk coolers cannot cool in a timely manner. PHE's are typically utilized in this instance to rapidly cool the milk to the desired temperature (or close to it) before it reaches the bulk milk tank. Typically, ground water is still utilized to provide some initial cooling to bring the milk to between 55 and 70 °F (13 and 21 °C). A second (and sometimes third) section of the PHE is added to remove the remaining heat with a mixture of chilled pure water and propylene glycol. These chiller systems can be made to incorporate large evaporator surface areas and high chilled water flow rates to cool high flow rates of milk.

== Milking operation ==
Milking machines are held in place automatically by a vacuum system that draws the ambient air pressure down from 15 to 21 pounds per square inch (100 to 140 kPa) of vacuum. The vacuum is also used to lift milk vertically through small diameter hoses, into the receiving can. A milk lift pump draws the milk from the receiving can through large diameter stainless steel piping, through the plate cooler, then into a refrigerated bulk tank.

Milk is extracted from the cow's udder by flexible rubber sheaths known as liners or inflations that are surrounded by a rigid air chamber. A pulsating flow of ambient air and vacuum is applied to the inflation's air chamber during the milking process. When ambient air is allowed to enter the chamber, the vacuum inside the inflation causes the inflation to collapse around the cow's teat, squeezing the milk out of teat in a similar fashion as a baby calf's mouth massaging the teat. When the vacuum is reapplied in the chamber the flexible rubber inflation relaxes and opens up, preparing for the next squeezing cycle.

It takes the average cow three to five minutes to give her milk. Some cows are faster or slower. Slow-milking cows may take up to fifteen minutes to let down all their milk. Though milking speed is not related to the quality of milk produced by the cow, it does impact the management of the milking process. Because most milkers milk cattle in groups, the milker can only process a group of cows at the speed of the slowest-milking cow. For this reason, many farmers will group slow-milking cows so as not to stress the faster milking cows.

The extracted milk passes through a strainer and plate heat exchangers before entering the tank, where it can be stored safely for a few days at approximately 40 °F (4 °C). At pre-arranged times, a milk truck arrives and pumps the milk from the tank for transport to a dairy factory where it will be pasteurized and processed into many products. The frequency of pick up depends and the production and storage capacity of the dairy; large dairies will have milk pick-ups once per day.

== Management of the herd ==
The dairy industry is a constantly evolving business. Management practices change with new technology and regulations that move the industry toward increased economic and environmental sustainability. Management strategies can also loosely be divided into intensive and extensive systems. Extensive systems operate based on a low input and low output philosophy, where intensive systems adopt a high input high output philosophy. These philosophies as well as available technologies, local regulations, and environmental conditions manifest in different management of nutrition, housing, health, reproduction and waste.

Most modern dairy farms divide the animals into different management units depending on their age, nutritional needs, reproductive status, and milk production status. The group of cows that are currently lactating, the milking herd, is often managed most intensively to make sure their diet and environmental conditions are conducive to producing as much high quality milk as possible. On some farms the milking herd is further divided into milking strings, which are groups of animals with different nutritional needs. The segment of the adult herd that are in the resting period before giving birth to their next calf are called dry cows because they are not being milked. All female animals that have yet to give birth to their first calf are called heifers. Some of them will grow up to take the place of older animals in the milking herd and thus are sometimes generally referred to as the replacement herd. The others, as well as most male calves are considered surplus dairy calves and are slaughtered for meat, such as veal dairy beef, or killed on farm.

=== Housing systems ===
Dairy cattle housing systems vary greatly throughout the world depending on the climate, dairy size, and feeding strategies. Housing must provide access to feed, water and protection from relevant environmental conditions. One issue for housing cattle is temperature extremes. Heat stress can decrease fertility and milk production in cattle. Providing shade is a very common method for reducing heat stress. Barns may also incorporate fans or tunnel ventilation into the architecture of the barn structure. Overly cold conditions, while rarely deadly for cattle, cause increases in maintenance energy requirements and thus increased feed intake and decreased milk production. During the winter months, where temperatures are low enough, dairy cattle are often kept inside barns which are warmed by their collective body heat.

Feed provision is also an important feature of dairy housing. Pasture based dairies are a more extensive option where cows are turned out to graze on pasture when the weather permits. Often the diet must be supplemented with when poor pasture conditions persist. Free stall barns and open lots are intensive housing options where feed is brought to the cattle at all times of year. Free stall barns are designed to allow the cows freedom to choose when they feed, rest, drink, or stand. They can be either fully enclosed or open air barns again depending on the climate. The resting areas, called free stalls, are divided beds lined with anything from mattresses to sand. In the lanes between rows of stalls, the floor is often make of grooved concrete. Most barns open onto uncovered corrals, which the cattle are free to enjoy as the weather allows. Open lots are dirt lots with constructed shade structures and a concrete pad where feed is delivered.

=== Milking systems ===
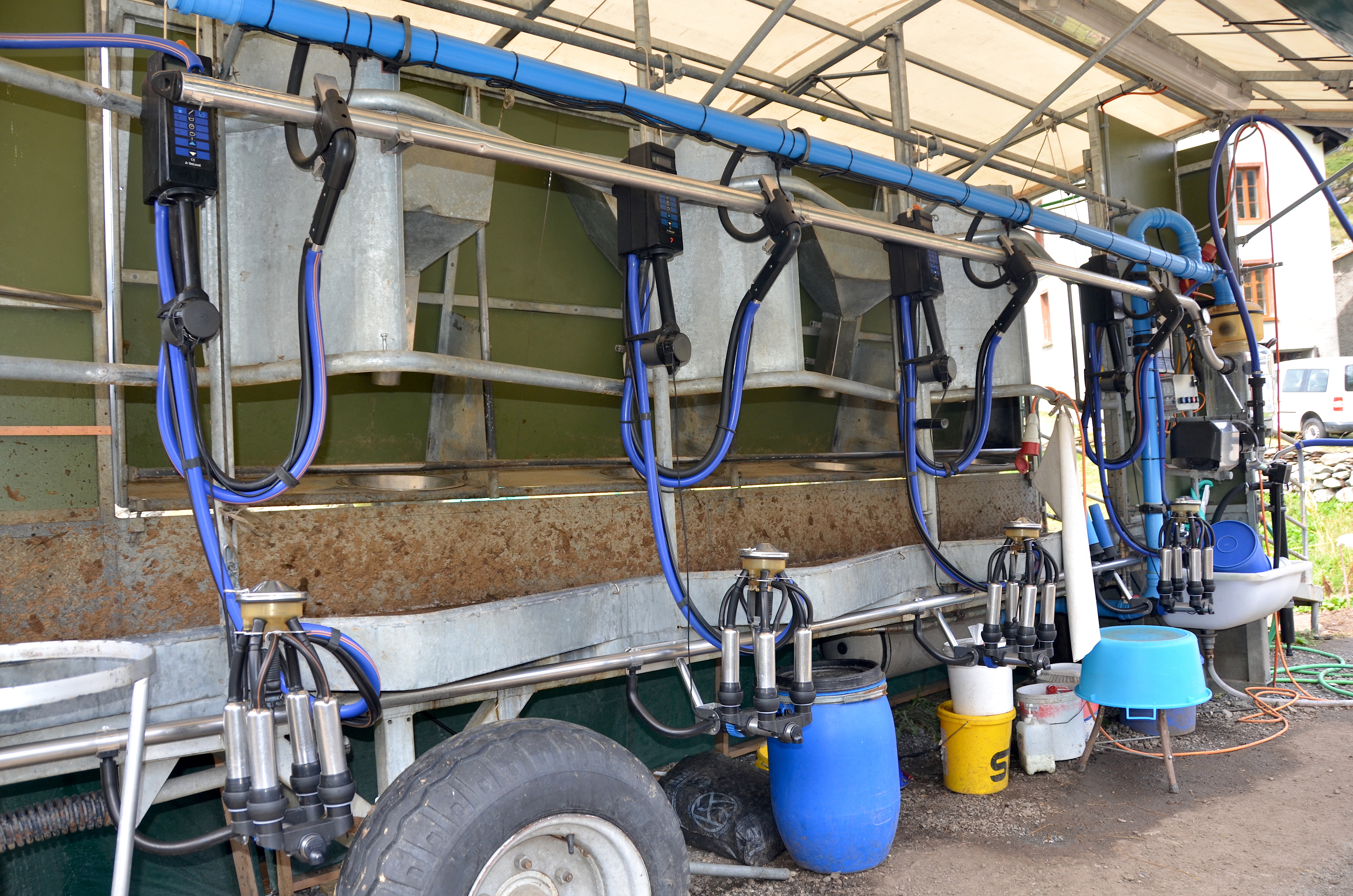
Mobile Milking Parlor from DeLaval

Life on a dairy farm revolves around the milking parlor. Each lactating cow will visit the parlor at least twice a day to be milked. A remarkable amount of engineering has gone into designing milking parlors and milking machines. Efficiency is crucial; every second saved while milking a single cow adds up to hours over the whole herd.

==== Milking machines ====
Milking is now performed almost exclusively by machine, though human technicians are still essential on most facilities. The most common milking machine is called a cluster milker. This milker consists of four metal cups— one per teat— each lined with rubber or silicone. The cluster is attached to both a milk collection system and a pulsating vacuum system. When the vacuum is on, it pulls air from between the outer metal cup and the liner, drawing milk out of the teat. When the vacuum turns off, it gives the teat an opportunity to refill with milk. In most milking systems, a milking technician must attach the cluster to each cow, but the machine senses when the cow has been fully milked and drops off independently.

==== Milking routine ====
Every time a cow enters the parlor several things need to happen to ensure milk quality and cow health. First, the cow's udder must be cleaned and disinfected to prevent both milk contamination and udder infections. Then the milking technician must check each teat for signs of infection by observing the first stream of milk. During this processes, called stripping the teat, the milking technician is looking for any discoloration or chunkiness that would indicate mastitis, an infection in the cow's mammary gland. Milk from a cow with mastitis cannot enter the human milk supply, thus farmers must be careful that infected milk does not mix with the milk from healthy cows and that the cow gets the necessary treatment. If the cow passes the mastitis inspection, the milking technician will attach the milking cluster. The cluster will run until the cow is fully milked and then drop off. The milk travels immediately through a cooling system and then into a large cooled storage tank, where it will stay until picked up by a refrigerated milk truck. Before the cow is released from the milking stalls her teats are disinfected one last time to prevent infection.

=== Nutritional management ===
Feed for their cattle is by far one of the largest expenses for dairy producer whether it be provided by the land they graze or crops grown or purchased. Pasture based dairy producers invest much time and effort into maintaining their pastures and thus feed for their cattle. Pasture management techniques such as rotational grazing are common for dairy production. Many large dairies that deliver food to their cattle have a dedicated nutritionist who is responsible for formulating diets with animal health, milk production, and cost efficiency in mind. For maximum productivity diets must be formulated differently depending on the growth rate, milk production, and reproductive status of each animal.

Cattle are classified as ruminants (suborder ruminantia belonging to the order artiodactyl) as they are able to acquire nutrients from even low quality plant-based food, thanks mainly to their symbiotic relationship with the microbes that ferment it in a chamber of their stomachs called the rumen. The rumen is a literal micro-ecosystem within each dairy cow. For optimal digestion, the environment of the rumen must be ideal for the microbes. In this way, the job of a ruminant nutritionist is to feed the microbes not the cow.

The nutritional requirements of cattle are usually divided into maintenance requirements, which depend on the cow's weight; and milk production requirements, which in turn depend on the volume of milk the cow is producing. The nutritional contents of each available feed are used to formulate a diet that meets all nutritional needs in the most cost effective way. Notably, cattle must be fed a diet high in fiber to maintain a proper environment for the rumen microbes. Farmers typically grow their own forage for their cattle. Crops grown may include corn, alfalfa, timothy, wheat, oats, sorghum and clover. These plants are often processed after harvest to preserve or improve nutrient value and prevent spoiling. Corn, alfalfa, wheat, oats, and sorghum crops are often anaerobically fermented to create silage. Many crops such as alfalfa, timothy, oats, and clover are allowed to dry in the field after cutting before being baled into hay.

To increase the energy density of their diet, cattle are commonly fed cereal grains. In many areas of the world, dairy rations also commonly include byproducts from other agricultural sectors. For example, in California cattle are commonly fed almond hulls and cotton seed. Feeding of byproducts can reduce the environmental impact of other agricultural sectors by keeping these materials out of landfills.

To meet all of their nutritional requirements cows must eat their entire ration. Unfortunately, much like humans, cattle have their favorite foods. To keep cattle from selectively eating the most desirable parts of the diet, most produces feed a total mixed ration (TMR). In this system all the components of the feed are well mixed in a mixing truck before being delivered to the cattle. Different TMRs are often prepared for groups of cows with different nutritional requirements.

=== Reproductive management ===
Female calves born on a dairy farm will typically be raised as replacement stock to take the place of older cows that are no longer sufficiently productive. The life of a dairy cow is a cycle of pregnancy and lactation starting at puberty. The timing of these events is very important to the production capacity of the dairy. A cow will not produce milk until she has given birth to a calf. Consequently, timing of the first breeding as well as all the subsequent breeding is important for maintaining milk production levels.

==== Puberty and first breeding ====
Most dairy producers aim for a replacement heifer to give birth to her first calf, and thus join the milking herd, on her second birthday. As the cow's gestation period is a little over 9 months this means the cow must be inseminated by the age of 15 months. Because the breeding process is inefficient, most producers aim to first breed their heifers between 12 and 14 months. Before a heifer can be bred she must reach sexual maturity and attain the proper body condition to successfully bear a calf. Puberty in cattle depends largely on weight among other factors. Holstein heifers reach puberty at an average body weight between 550 and 650 lbs. Smaller breeds of cattle, such as Jerseys, usually reach puberty earlier at a lighter weight. Under typical nutritional conditions, Holstein heifers will reach puberty at the age 9–10 months. Proper body condition for breeding is also largely judged by weight. At about 800 lbs Holstein heifers will normally be able to carry a healthy calf and give birth with relative ease. In this way, the heifers will be able to give birth and join the milking herd before their second birthday.

==== Estrous cycle ====
Puberty coincides with the beginning of estrous cycles. Estrous cycles are the recurring hormonal and physiological changes that occur within the bodies of most mammalian females that lead to ovulation and the development of a suitable environment for embryonic and fetal growth. The cow is considered polyestrous, which means that she will continue to undergo regular estrous cycles until death unless the cycle is interrupted by a pregnancy.

In cows, a complete estrous cycle lasts 21 days. Most commonly, dairy producers discuss the estrous cycle as beginning when the cow is receptive to breeding. This short phase lasting only about a day is also known as estrus or colloquially, heat. The cow will often exhibit several behavioral changes during this phase including increased activity and vocalizations. Most importantly, during estrus she will stand still when mounted by another cow or bull.

==== Mating and pregnancy ====
In the United States, artificial insemination (AI) is a very important reproductive tool used on dairy facilities. AI, is the process by which sperm is deliberately delivered by dairy managers or veterinarians into the cow's uterus. Bulls “donate” semen at a stud farm but there is never any physical contact between the cow and the bull when using this method.

This method of insemination quickly gained popularity among dairy producers for several reasons. Dairy bulls are notoriously dangerous to keep on the average dairy facility. AI also makes it possible to speed the genetic improvement of the dairy herd because every dairy farmer has access to sperm from genetically superior sires. Additionally, AI has been shown to reduce spread of venereal diseases within herd that would ultimately lead to fertility problems. Many producers also find it to be more economical than keeping a bull. On the other hand, AI does require more intensive reproductive management of the herd as well as more time and expertise. Detection of estrus, becomes reliant on observation in the absence of bulls. It takes considerable expertise to properly inseminate a cow and high quality sperm is valuable. Ultimately, because dairy production was already a management intensive industry the disadvantages are dwarfed by the advantages of the AI for many dairy producers.

The majority of cows carry a single calf. Pregnancy lasts an average of 280 to 285 days or a little less than 9 and one half months.

=== Lactation management ===
After the birth of a calf the cow begins to lactate. Lactation will normally continue for as long as the cow is milked but production will steadily decline. Dairy farmers are extremely familiar with the pattern of milk production and carefully time the cow's next breeding to maximize milk production. The pattern of lactation and pregnancy is known as the lactation cycle.

For a period of 20 days post parturition the cow is called a fresh cow. Milk production quickly increases during this phase but milk composition is also significantly different from the rest of the cycle. This first milk, called colostrum, is rich in fats, protein, and also maternal immune cells. This colostrum is not usually commercially sold, but is extremely important for early calf nutrition. Perhaps most importantly, it conveys passive immunity to the calf before its immune system is fully developed.

The next 30 to 60 days of the lactation cycle is characterized by peak milk production levels. The amount of milk produced per day during this period varies considerably by breed and by individual cow depending on her body condition, genetics, health, and nutrition. During this period the body condition of the cow will suffer because the cow will draw on her body stores to maintain such high milk production. Food intake of the cow also will increase. After peak lactation, the cow's milk production levels will slowly decline for the rest of the lactation cycle. The producer will often breed the cow soon after she leaves peak production. For a while, the cow's food intake will remain high before also beginning a decline to pre lactation levels. After peak milk production her body condition will also steadily recover.

Producers will typically continue to milk the cow until she is two months away from parturition then they will dry her off. Giving the cow a break during the final stages of pregnancy allows her mammary gland to regress and re-develop, her body condition to recover, and the calf to develop normally. Decreased body condition in the cow means she will not be as productive in subsequent milk cycles. Decreased health in the new born calf will negatively impact the quality of the replacement herd. There is also evidence that increased rates of mammary cell proliferation occur during the dry period that is essential to maintaining high production levels in subsequent lactation cycles.

== Concerns ==
=== Animal waste from large cattle dairies ===
As measured in phosphorus, the waste output of 5,000 cows roughly equals a municipality of 70,000 people. In the U.S., dairy operations with more than 1,000 cows meet the EPA definition of a CAFO (Concentrated Animal Feeding Operation), and are subject to EPA regulations. For example, in the San Joaquin Valley of California a number of dairies have been established on a very large scale. Each dairy consists of several modern milking parlor set-ups operated as a single enterprise. Each milking parlor is surrounded by a set of 3 or 4 loafing barns housing 1,500 or 2,000 cattle. Some of the larger dairies have planned 10 or more series of loafing barns and milking parlors in this arrangement, so that the total operation may include as many as 15,000 or 20,000 cows. The milking process for these dairies is similar to a smaller dairy with a single milking parlor but repeated several times. The size and concentration of cattle creates major environmental issues associated with manure handling and disposal, which requires substantial areas of cropland (a ratio of 5 or 6 cows to the acre, or several thousand acres for dairies of this size) for manure spreading and dispersion, or several-acre methane digesters. Air pollution from methane gas associated with manure management also is a major concern. As a result, proposals to develop dairies of this size can be controversial and provoke substantial opposition from environmentalists including the Sierra Club and local activists.

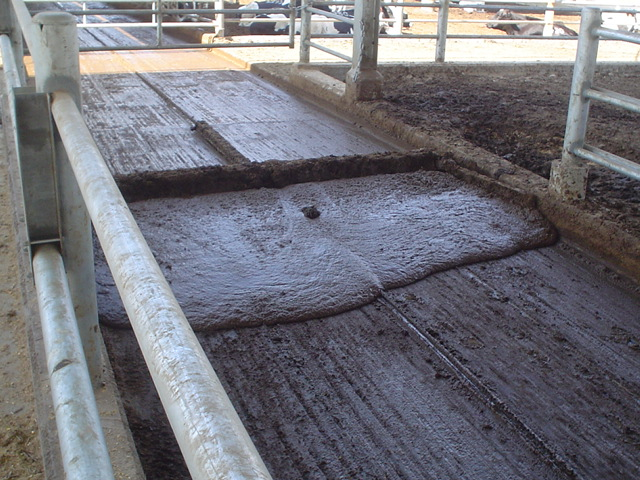
Manure scraper pushing cow manure.

The potential impact of large dairies was demonstrated when a massive manure spill occurred on a 5,000-cow dairy in Upstate New York, contaminating a 20-mile (32 km) stretch of the Black River, and killing 375,000 fish. On 10 August 2005, a manure storage lagoon collapsed releasing 3,000,000 US gallons (11,000,000 L; 2,500,000 imp gal) of manure into the Black River. Subsequently, the New York Department of Environmental Conservation mandated a settlement package of $2.2 million against the dairy.

When properly managed, dairy and other livestock waste, due to its nutrient content (N, P, K), makes an excellent fertilizer promoting crop growth, increasing soil organic matter, and improving overall soil fertility and tilth characteristics. Most dairy farms in the United States are required to develop nutrient management plans for their farms, to help balance the flow of nutrients and reduce the risks of environmental pollution. These plans encourage producers to monitor all nutrients coming onto the farm as feed, forage, animals, fertilizer, etc. and all nutrients exiting the farm as product, crop, animals, manure, etc. For example, a precision approach to animal feeding results in less overfeeding of nutrients and a subsequent decrease in environmental excretion of nutrients, such as phosphorus. In recent years, nutritionists have realized that requirements for phosphorus are much lower than previously thought. These changes have allowed dairy producers to reduce the amount of phosphorus being fed to their cows with a reduction in environmental pollution.

=== Use of hormones ===
It is possible to maintain higher milk production by supplementing cows with growth hormones known as recombinant BST or rBST, but this is controversial due to its effects on animal and possibly human health. The European Union, Japan, Australia, New Zealand and Canada have banned its use due to these concerns.

In the US however, no such prohibition exists, but rBST is not used on dairy farms. Most dairy processors, if not all, will not accept milk with rBST. The U.S. Food and Drug Administration states that no "significant difference" has been found between milk from treated and non-treated cows but based on consumer concerns several milk purchasers and resellers have elected not to purchase milk produced with rBST.

=== Animal welfare ===
The practice of dairy production in a factory farm environment has been criticized by animal welfare activists. Some of the ethical complaints regarding dairy production cited include how often the dairy cattle must remain pregnant, the separation of calves from their mothers (called cow-calf separation), how dairy cattle are housed, and environmental concerns regarding dairy production.

The production of milk requires that the cow be in lactation, which is a result of the cow having given birth to a calf. The cycle of insemination, pregnancy, parturition, and lactation, followed by a "dry" period of about two months of forty-five to fifty days, before calving which allows udder tissue to regenerate. A dry period that falls outside this time frame can result in decreased milk production in subsequent lactation.

An important part of the dairy industry is the removal of the calves off the mother's milk after the three days of needed colostrum, allowing for the collection of the milk produced. On some dairies, in order for this to take place, the calves are fed milk replacer, a substitute for the whole milk produced by the cow. Milk replacer is generally a powder, which comes in large bags, and is added to precise amounts of water, and then fed to the calf via bucket, bottle or automated feeder.

Milk replacers are classified by three categories: protein source, protein/fat (energy) levels, and medication or additives (e.g. vitamins and minerals). Proteins for the milk replacer come from different sources; the more favorable and more expensive all milk protein (e.g. whey protein- a by-product of the cheese industry) and alternative proteins including soy, animal plasma and wheat gluten. The ideal levels for fat and protein in milk replacer are 10-28% and 18-30%, respectively. The higher the energy levels (fat and protein), the less starter feed (feed which is given to young animals) the animal will consume. Weaning can take place when a calf is consuming at least two pounds of starter feed a day and has been on starter for at least three weeks. Milk replacer has climbed in cost US$15–20 a bag in recent years, so early weaning is economically crucial to effective calf management.

Common ailments affecting dairy cows include infectious disease (e.g. mastitis, endometritis and digital dermatitis), metabolic disease (e.g. milk fever and ketosis) and injuries caused by their environment (e.g. hoof and hock lesions).

Lameness is commonly considered one of the most significant animal welfare issues for dairy cattle, and is best defined as any abnormality that causes an animal to change its gait. It can be caused by a number of sources, including infections of the hoof tissue (e.g. fungal infections that cause dermatitis) and physical damage causing bruising or lesions (e.g. ulcers or hemorrhage of the hoof). Housing and management features common in modern dairy farms (such as concrete barn floors, limited access to pasture and suboptimal bed-stall design) have been identified as contributing risk factors to infections and injuries. A mobility scoring system is commonly used to assess cattle Lameness combined with scoring systems to assess adjacent risk factors.

=== Greenhouse gas emissions ===
Milk is estimated to have been responsible for 18% of agricultural greenhouse gas emissions in 2014.

== Market ==
=== Worldwide ===
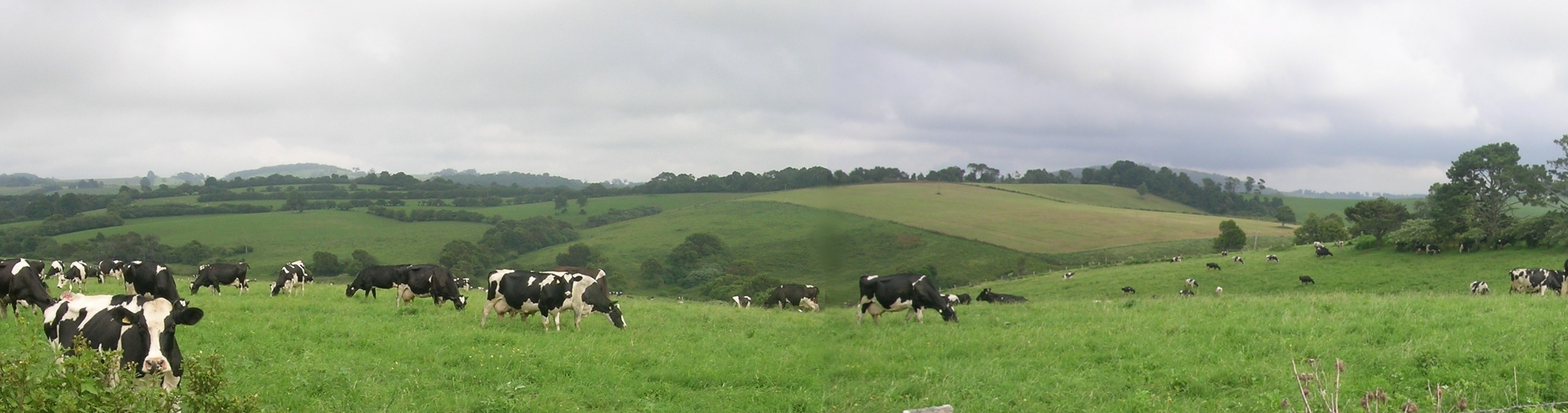
Holstein cows on a dairy farm, Comboyne, New South Wales

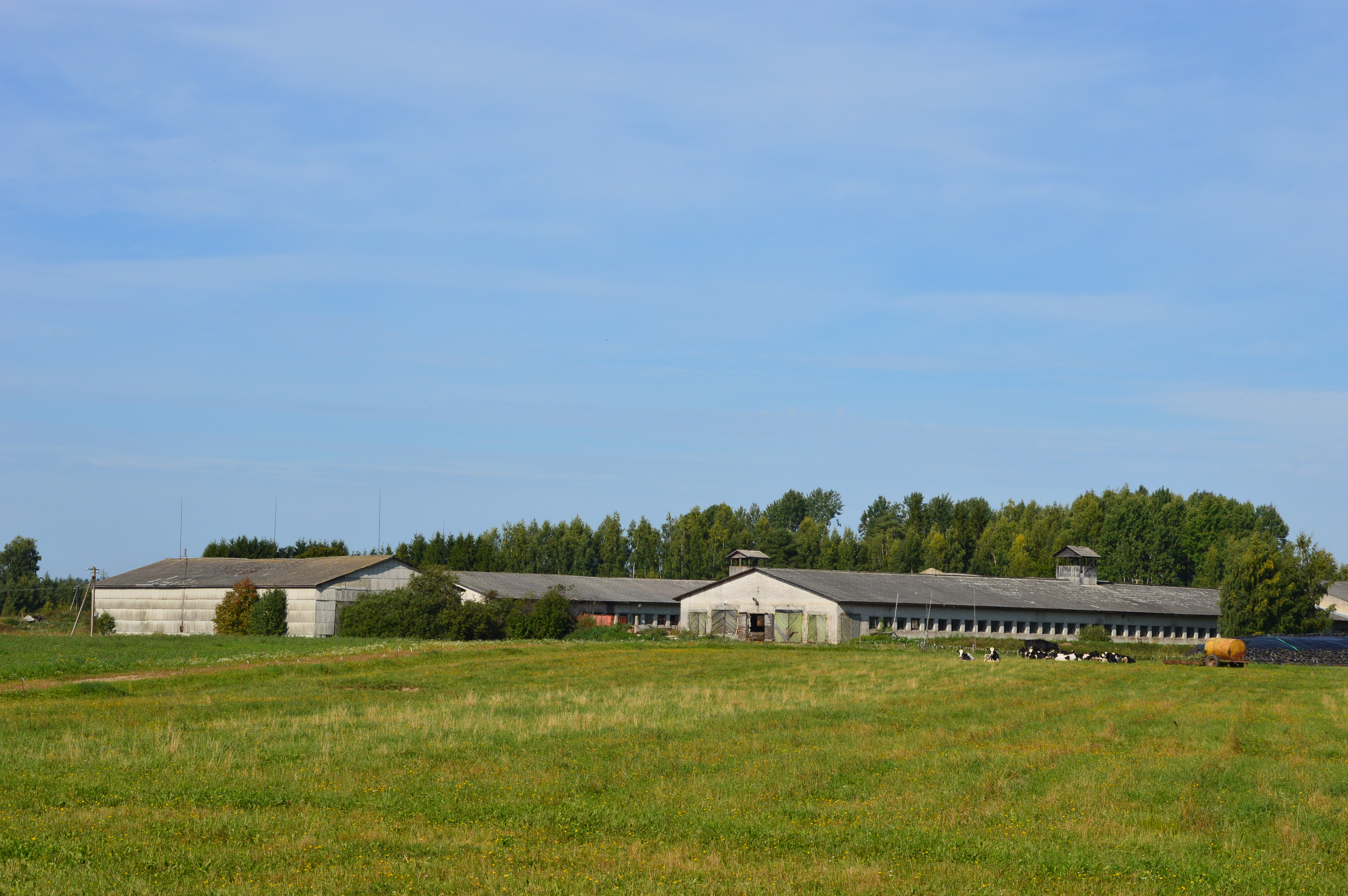
Dairy farm in Võru Parish, Estonia

There is a great deal of variation in the pattern of dairy production worldwide. Many countries which are large producers consume most of this internally, while others (in particular New Zealand), export a large percentage of their production. Internal consumption is often in the form of liquid milk, while the bulk of international trade is in processed dairy products such as milk powder.

The milking of cows was traditionally a labor-intensive operation and still is in less developed countries. Small farms need several people to milk and care for only a few dozen cows, though for many farms these employees have traditionally been the children of the farm family, giving rise to the term "family farm".

Advances in technology have mostly led to the radical redefinition of "family farms" in industrialized countries such as Australia, New Zealand, and the United States. With farms of hundreds of cows producing large volumes of milk, the larger and more efficient dairy farms are more able to weather severe changes in milk price and operate profitably, while "traditional" family farms generally do not have the equity or income other larger scale farms do. The common public perception of large corporate farms supplanting smaller ones is generally a misconception, as many small family farms expand to take advantage of economies of scale, and incorporate the business to limit the legal liabilities of the owners and simplify such things as tax management.The transition from family farms to farms with employed staff who carry out the day-to-day management of the herd's animals has changed the farmer's duties and role on the farm. New questions have arisen concerning how the development of bigger farms places greater demands on strategies focused on financial control, leadership, and personnel issues.

Before large scale mechanization arrived in the 1950s, keeping a dozen milk cows for the sale of milk was profitable. Now most dairies must have more than one hundred cows being milked at a time in order to be profitable, with other cows and heifers waiting to be "freshened" to join the milking herd. In New Zealand, the average herd size increased from 113 cows in the 1975–76 season to 435 cows in 2018–19 season.

Worldwide, the largest cow milk producer is the United States, the largest cow milk exporter is New Zealand, and the largest importer is China. The European Union with its present 27 member countries produced 158,800,000 metric tons (156,300,000 long tons; 175,000,000 short tons) in 2013 (96.8% cow milk), the most by any politico-economic union.

=== Supply management ===
The Canadian dairy industry is one of four sectors that is under the supply management system, a national agricultural policy framework that coordinates supply and demand through production and import control and pricing mechanisms designed to prevent shortages and surpluses, to ensure farmers a fair rate of return and Canadian consumer access to a high-quality, stable, and secure supply of these sensitive products. The milk supply management system is a "federated provincial policy" with four governing agencies, organizations and committees—Canadian Dairy Commission, Canadian Milk Supply Management Committee (CMSMC), regional milk pools, and provincial milk marketing boards. The dairy supply management system is administered by the federal government through the Canadian Dairy Commission (CDC), which was established in 1966 and is composed mostly of dairy farmers, administers the dairy supply management system for Canada's 12,000 dairy farms. The federal government is involved in supply management through the CDC in the administration of imports and exports. The Canadian Milk Supply Management Committee (CMSMC) was introduced in 1970 as the body responsible for monitoring the production rates of milk and setting the national Market Sharing Quota (MSQ) for industrial raw milk. The supply management system was authorized in 1972 through the Farm Products Agencies Act. Supply management ensures consistent pricing of milk for farmers with no fluctuation in the market. The prices are based on the demand for milk throughout the country and how much is being produced. In order to start a new farm or increase production more share into the SMS needs to be bought into known as "Quota". in this case farmers must remain up to or below the amount of "quota" they have bought share of. Each province in Canada has their own cap on quota based on the demand in the market. There is a cap on the countries quota known as total quota per month. In 2016 the total butter fat produced per month was 28,395,848 kg.

=== World milk production data ===
Total milk production, measured in tonnes per year, per continent.

World total milk production in 2017 FAO statistics (including cow/buffalo/goat/sheep/camel milk)
Rank	Country	Production (1000 tonnes/year)	Share in Global Production
	World	827,884	100%
1	India	176,272	21.29%
2	United States	97,760	11.81%
3	Pakistan	44,293	5.35%
4	China	34,869	4.21%
5	Brazil	33,742	4.08%
6	Germany	32,695	3.95%
7	Russia	31,177	3.77%
8	France	25,260	3.05%
9	New Zealand	21,372	2.58%
10	Turkey	20,700	2.50%
11	United Kingdom	15,256	1.84%
12	Netherlands	14,544	1.76%
13	Poland	13,702	1.66%
14	Italy	12,027	1.45%
15	Mexico	11,988	1.45%
16	Ukraine	10,520	1.27%
17	Uzbekistan	10,167	1.23%
18	Argentina	10,097	1.22%
19	Australia	8,800	1.06%
20	Canada	8,100	0.98%

=== United States ===
In the United States, the top five dairy states are, in order by total milk production; California, Wisconsin, New York, Idaho, and Texas. Dairy farming is also an important industry in Florida, Minnesota, Ohio and Vermont. There are 40,000 dairy farms in the United States.

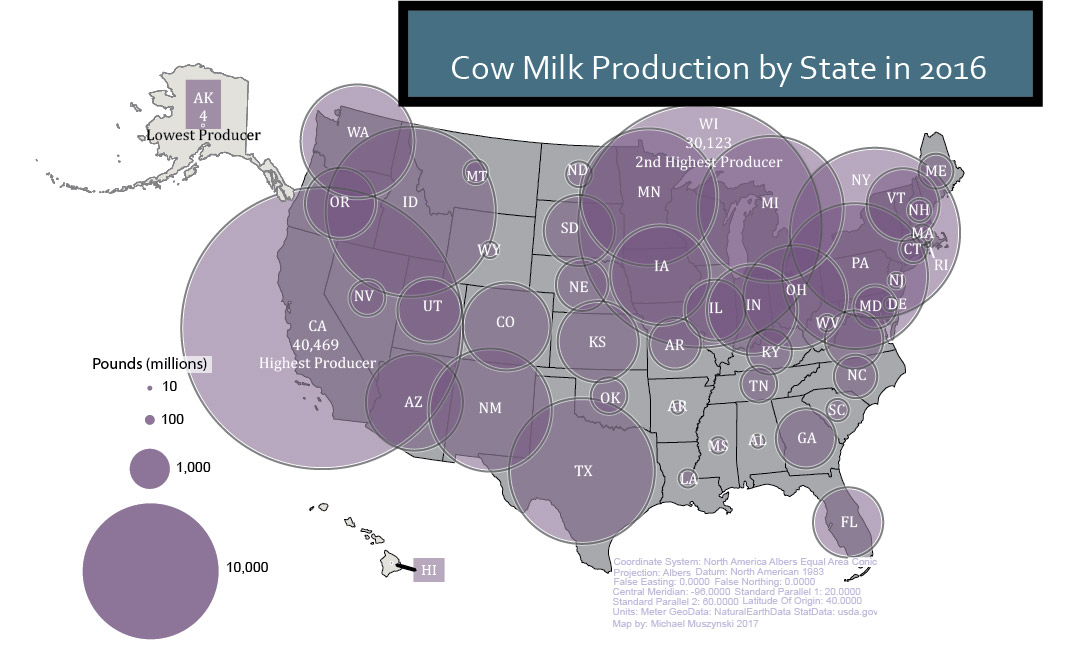
Cow Milk Production by State in 2016

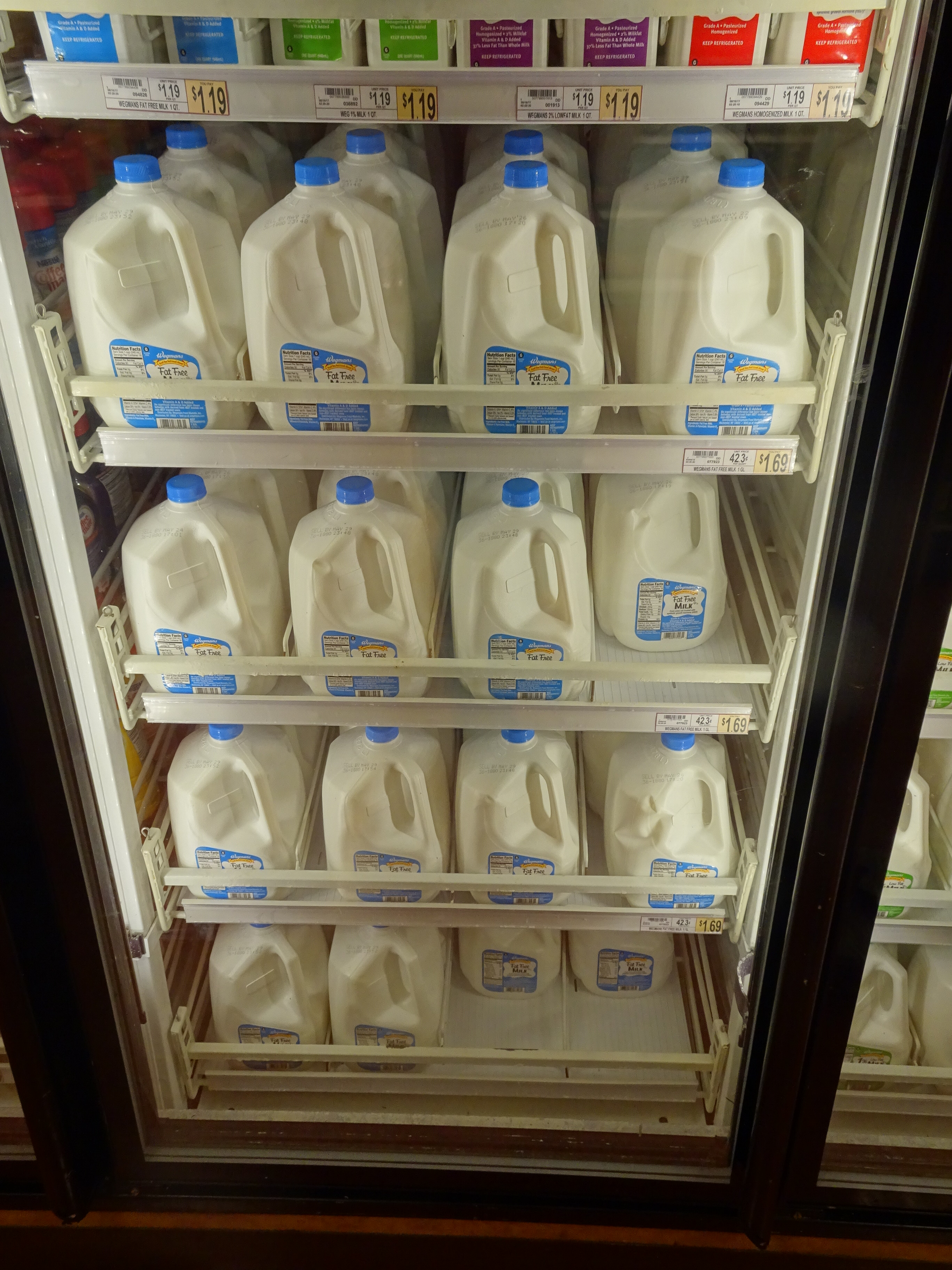
After a brief rise following the Great Recession of 2008–9, milk prices crashed again in the late 2010s to well under $3 a gallon at major grocers in the United States.

Pennsylvania has 8,500 farms with 555,000 dairy cows. Milk produced in Pennsylvania yields an annual revenue of about US$1.5 billion.

Milk prices collapsed in 2009. Senator Bernie Sanders accused Dean Foods of controlling 40% of the country's milk market. He has requested the United States Department of Justice to pursue an anti-trust investigation. Dean Foods says it buys 15% of the country's raw milk. In 2011, a federal judge approved a settlement of $30 million to 9,000 farmers in the Northeast.

Herd size in the US varies between 1,200 on the West Coast and Southwest, where large farms are commonplace, to roughly 50 in the Midwest and Northeast, where land-base is a significant limiting factor to herd size. The average herd size in the U.S. is about one hundred cows per farm but the midpoint size is 900 cows with 49% of all cows residing on farms of 1000 or more cows.

=== European Union ===
European total milk production in 2009 FAO statistics (including cow/goat/sheep/buffalo milk)
Rank	Country	Production (10^{6} kg/y)
	European Union (all 27 countries)	153,033
1	Germany	28,691
2	France	24,218
3	United Kingdom	13,237
4	Italy	12,836
5	Poland	12,467
6	Netherlands	11,469
7	Spain	7,252
8	Romania	5,809
9	Ireland	5.373
10	Denmark	4,814

=== Climate change and milk yields ===
In 2009, there were 1.2 billion cattle in the world, with around 82% in the developing countries. The number has increased since then, with the 2021 figure at 1.53 billion. In 2020, it was found that in a current Eastern Mediterranean climate, cattle experience mild heat stress inside unadapted stalls for nearly half a year (159 days). Moderate heat stress is felt indoors and outdoors during May, June, July, August, September, and October. June and August are the months where cattle are exposed to severe heat stress outside, which is mitigated to moderate heat stress indoors.

== See also ==
- Alfa Laval
- Animal husbandry
- Calf hutch
- Camel milk
- Dairy cattle
- Dairy products
- Factory farming
- Family farm
- List of dairy products
- Managed intensive grazing
- Ubre Blanca, a record milk-producing cow
- Veal
- Veganism
