= Marshall A. Barber =

American biologist who studied malaria

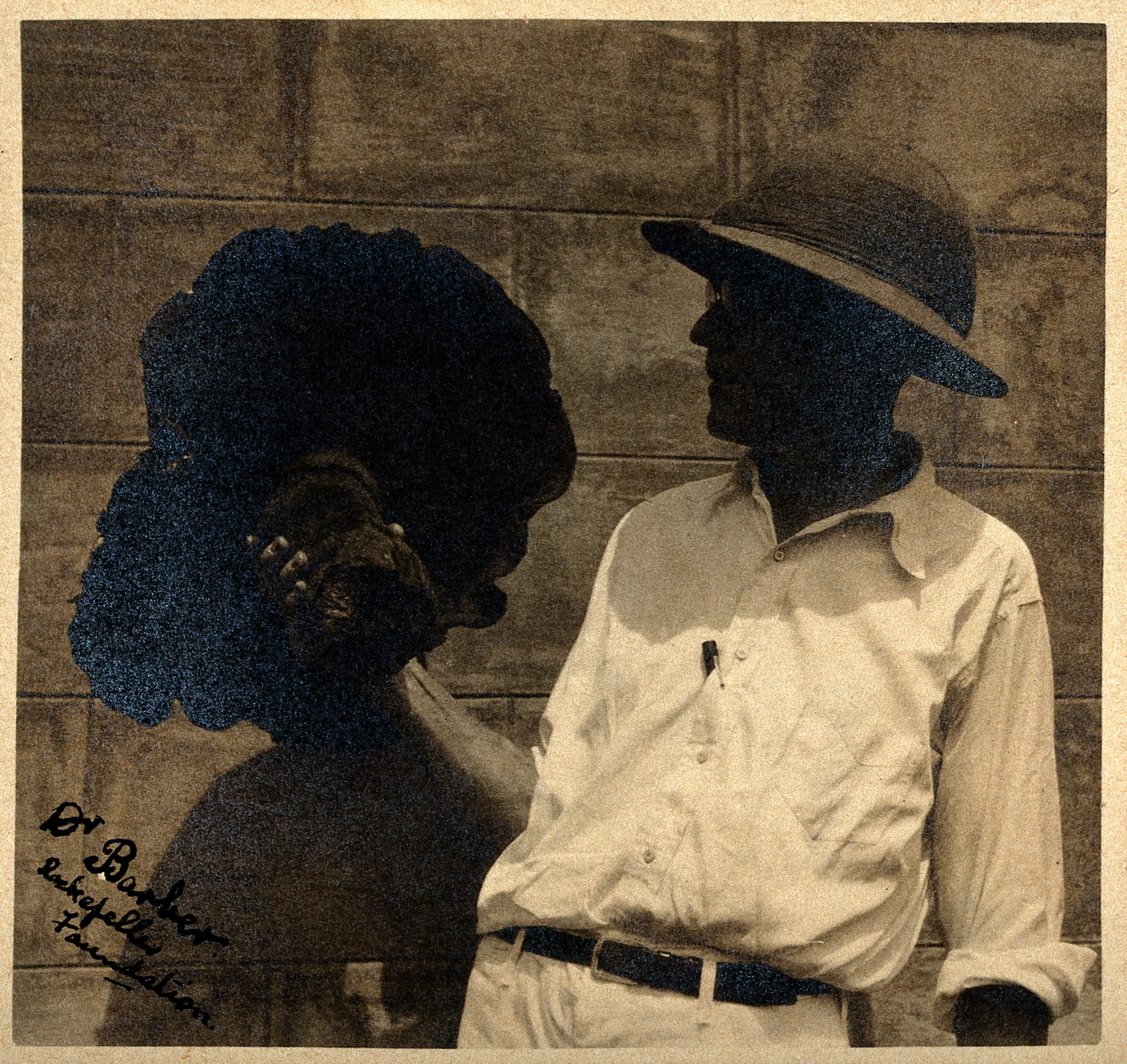

Marshall Albert Barber (1868–1953) was a biologist who studied malaria affiliated with the Rockefeller Foundation and the University of Kansas. He proposed the technique of microinjection to clone bacteria. He developed micropipette methods in 1904 for microscopic renal physiology. He also worked with the U.S. military on public health issues, offering his advice during both World Wars. He earned three degrees from Harvard. He graduated from the University of Kansas in 1891, studied for a second bachelor's degree and a master's degree at Harvard, graduating in 1894, and taught botany and bacteriology at Kansas. He earned a PhD from Harvard in 1907 and went to the Philippines in 1911. In 1915 he went to Malaysia with the Rockefeller Foundation. In 1913 while working in Manila he may have been the first to discover mastitis in dairy cattle while experimenting on himself.
