= Jacketed vessel =

Container that controls temperature of contents

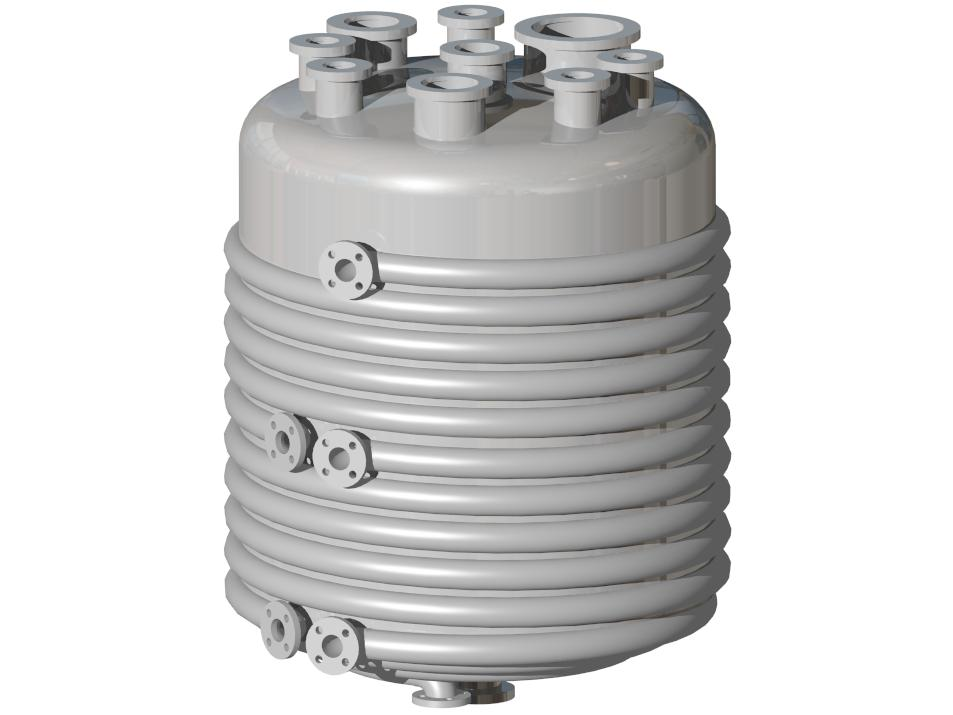
External view of a half-pipe coil jacketed vessel

Symbols used in P&ID to represent a jacketed agitated vessel (left) and a half-pipe jacketed agitated vessel (right)

In chemical engineering, a jacketed vessel is a container that is designed for controlling temperature of its contents, by using a cooling or heating "jacket" around the vessel through which a cooling or heating fluid is circulated.

A jacket is a cavity external to the vessel that permits the uniform exchange of heat between the fluid circulating in it and the walls of the vessel. There are several types of jackets, depending on the design:

- Conventional Jackets. A second shell is installed over a portion of the vessel, creating an annular space within which cooling or heating medium flows. A simple conventional jacket, with no internal components, is generally very inefficient for heat transfer because the flow media has an extremely low velocity resulting in a low heat transfer coefficient. Condensing media, such as steam or Dowtherm A, is an exception because in this case the heat transfer coefficient doesn't depend on velocity or turbulence, but instead is related to the surface area upon which the media condenses and the efficiency of removing condensate. Internals include baffles that direct flow in a spiral pattern around the jacket, and agitating nozzles that cause high turbulence at the point where the fluid is introduced into the jacket.
- Half-Pipe Coil Jackets. Pipes are split lengthwise, usually with an included angle of 180 degrees (split evenly down the middle) or 120 degrees, then wound around the vessel and welded in place.
- Dimple Jackets. A thin external shell is affixed to the vessel shell with spot welds located in a regular pattern, often about 50 mm on center both horizontally and vertically. These so-called dimples impart turbulence to the heating or cooling media as it flows through the jacket (see Pillow plate heat exchanger).
- Plate Coils. Often very similar to dimple jackets, but fabricated separately as fully contained jackets that are then strapped to a vessel. They are slightly less efficient than dimple jackets because there is a double layer of metal for the heat to traverse (the plate coil inside surface and the vessel shell). They also require good bonding to the vessel jacket, to prevent an insulating gap between the plate coil and the vessel.

Jackets can be applied to the entire surface of a vessel or just a portion of it. For a vertical vessel, the top head is typically left unjacketed. Jackets can be divided into zones, to divide the flow of the heating or cooling medium. Advantages include: ability to direct flow to certain portions of the jacket, such as only the bottom head when minimal heating or cooling is needed and the entire jacket when maximum heating or cooling is required; ability to provide a higher volume of flow overall (zones are piped in parallel) because the pressure drop through a zone is lower than if the entire jacket is a single zone.

Jacketed vessels can be employed as chemical reactors (to remove the elevated heat of reaction) or to reduce the viscosity of high viscous fluids (such as tar).

Agitation can be also used in jacketed vessels to improve the homogeneity of the fluid properties (such as temperature or concentration).

== See also ==
- Heat exchanger
- Water jacket
- Mixing (process engineering)

== Bibliography ==
- "API Chemical Synthesis: Trends in Reactor Heat Transfer Design", Stephen Hall and Andy Stoker. Pharmaceutical Engineering, January/February 2004
- "Estimate Heat Transfer and Friction in Dimple Jackets", John Garvin, CEP Magazine, April 2001
- "Heat Transfer in Agitated Jacketed Vessels", Robert Dream, Chemical Engineering, January 1999
