= Breed method =

Way to count micro-organisms in milk

Breed method is a laboratory technique used for counting microorganisms in milk. It was introduced in 1910 by American biologists Samuel Cate Prescott and Robert Stanley Breed.

== Purpose ==
It is a method for somatic cell count, to know the number of living and dead microorganisms. When the method only recounts living organisms is called "viable count".

There are many methods for the quantification of microorganisms, including microscopy methods, Coulter counter, Mass Spectrometry (for estimating cell mass), and Cell Culture methods which form and grow colonies of bacteria.

The existing security in dairy products is given by the microbiological quality of the same, which ensures consumption from the point of view of health.

The analysis of the quality of raw milk is a common practice in the dairy industry and aims to control the quality of the samples and the material introduced into the processing plant, culminating in a mass-consumption to ensure quality standards.

== See also ==
- Somatic cell count
