= California mastitis test =

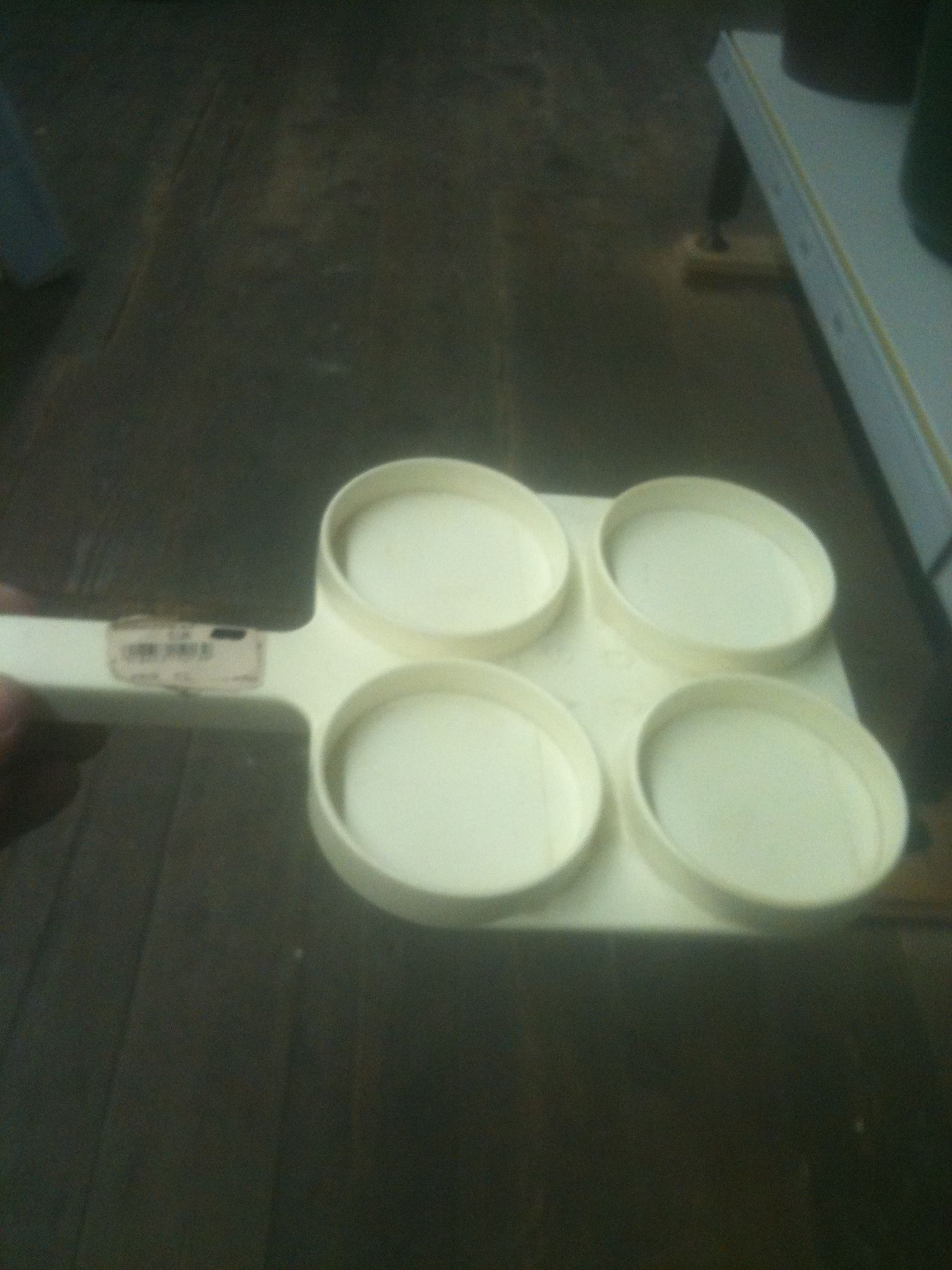
Four-well plastic paddle

The California mastitis test (CMT) is a simple cow-side indicator of the somatic cell count of milk. It operates by disrupting the cell membrane of any cells present in the milk sample, allowing the DNA in those cells to react with the test reagent, forming a gel. It provides a useful technique for detecting subclinical cases of mastitis.

== Development ==
Whiteside described a reaction between sodium hydroxide and milk that resulted in the thickening of mastitic milk. The utility of this reaction as a field test was limited by the fact that the reaction was sometimes difficult to observe, and would eventually occur even in normal milk. A refined version of the test, which enhanced its sensitivity, and eliminated the confounding effect of milk fat, uses an anionic surfactant, which forms a gel with the DNA in somatic cells in the milk.

== Use ==
A four-well plastic paddle is used, one well being for each quarter of the cow to be tested. Foremilk is discarded, and then a little milk drawn into each well. An equal volume of test reagent is added, and gently agitated. The reaction is scored on a scale of 0 (mixture remains unchanged) to 3 (almost-solid gel forms), with a score of 2 or 3 being considered a positive result. A special reagent for the test is marketed under the name 'CMT-Test', but domestic detergents are frequently used instead, being cheaper and more readily available. Fairy Liquid is as suitable as a reagent for the CMT, although many cheaper detergents are not.
