= Bulk tank =

Milk storage tank

In dairy farming a bulk milk cooling tank is a large storage tank for cooling and holding milk at a cold temperature until it can be picked up by a milk hauler. The bulk milk cooling tank is an important piece of dairy farm equipment. It is usually made of stainless steel and used every day to store the raw milk on the farm in good condition. It must be cleaned after each milk collection. The milk cooling tank can be the property of the farmer or be rented from a dairy plant.

== Bulk tank types ==
Different types of milk cooling tanks

Raw milk producers have a choice of either open (from 150 to 3,000 litres (40 to 793 US gal)) or closed (from 1,000 to 10,000 litres (260 to 2,640 US gal)) tanks. The cost can vary considerably, depending on manufacturing norms and whether a new or secondhand tank is purchased.

Milk silos (10,000 litres (2,600 US gal) and plus) are suitable for the very large producer. These are designed to be installed outside and adjacent to the dairy, all controls and the milk outlet pipe being situated in the dairy.

=== Tank construction ===
Bulk milk cooling tank description

A milk-cooling tank, also known as a bulk tank or milk cooler, consists of an inner and an outer tank, both made of high-quality stainless steel.

The space between the outer tank and the inner tank is insulated with polyurethane foam. In case of a power failure with an outside temperature of 30 °C (86 °F), the content of the tank will warm up only 1 °C (34 °F) in 24 hours.

To facilitate an adequate and rapid cooling of the entire content of a tank, every tank is equipped with at least one agitator. Stirring the milk ensures that all milk inside the tank is of the same temperature and that the milk stays homogeneous.

On top of every closed milk cooling tank is a manhole of about 40 centimetres (16 in) diameter. This enables thorough cleaning and inspection of the inner tank if necessary. The manhole is covered by a lid and sealed watertight with a rubber ring. Also on top are 2 or 3 small inlets. One is covered with an air-vent, the other(s) can be used to pump milk into the tank.

A milk cooling tank usually stands on 4, 6, or 8 adjustable legs. The built-in tilt of the inner tank ensures that even the last drop of milk will eventually flow to the outlet.

At the bottom, every milk cooling tank has a threaded outlet, usually including a valve.

All tanks have a thermometer, allowing for immediate inspection of the inner temperature.

Most tanks include an automatic cleaning system. Using hot and cold water, an acid and/or alkaline cleaning fluid, a pump and a spray lance will clean the inner tank, ensuring an hygienic inner environment each time the tank is emptied.

Almost every tank has a control box. It manages the cooling process by use of a thermostat. The user can turn the system on and off, allow for extra and immediate stirring, start the cleaning routine, and reset the entire system in case of a failure.

New and bigger milk cooling tanks are now being equipped with monitoring and alarm systems. These systems guard temperature of the milk inside the tank, check the functioning of the agitator, the cooling unit and temperature of the cleaning water. In case of malfunctioning of any of these functions, the alarm will activate. The monitoring system will also keep a record of the temperature and of all malfunctions for a given period.

==== Bulk tank manufacturing norms ====
Norms define among other criteria: insulation, milk agitation, cooling power required, variations in milk quantity measurement, calibration, … Some are more demanding than others.

- ISO standard 5708 (Refrigerated bulk milk tanks), published in 1983
- European standard EN 13732 (Food processing machinery – Bulk milk coolers on farms – Requirements for construction, performance, suitability for use, safety and hygiene), published in 2003, updated in 2009
- Northern American sanitary standard 3A 13-11 (3-A Sanitary Standards for Farm Milk Cooling and Holding Tanks, 13-11), effective July 23, 2012 www.3-a.org

==== Bulk tank outlet standards ====
Swedish outlet (SMS 1145), German outlet (DIN 11851), English RJT (BS 4825), IDF (ISO 2853), tri-clamp (ISO 2852), Danish outlet (DS 722), .... can be found, not to mention different diameters. They vary from country to country. Non standard outlets make the milk collection process difficult, as the operator needs to adapt to each different standard/diameter.

=== Cooling Systems ===
There are two primary methods of cooling milk entering the bulk tank, each with its own advantages and disadvantages. The tank capacity and type will depend on herd size, calving pattern, frequency of milk collection, required milk quality, energy and water availability and future plans for development.

==== Direct Expansion ====
A bulk tank with direct expansion cooling has pipes or pillow plates carrying refrigerant which are welded directly to the exterior of the milk chamber. A layer of insulation covers the exterior of the milk tank and the cooling lines, with an exterior metal shell over the insulation.

Direct expansion cooling cannot run when the tank is empty or the inside walls of the tank would freeze. Instead, the tank is rapidly cooled as warm milk first enters the tank, and then the tank is cooled slowly just to maintain a low storage temperature. The rapid cooling during milking requires very large refrigeration compressors and condenser radiators to quickly expel heat from the milk, and is better suited for very large farming operations where three-phase electric power is available to operate the high-power cooling system.

==== Ice Bank ====
A bulk tank using an Ice Builder or Ice Bank immerses the bottom of the inner milk chamber in an open pool of water with copper tubes containing refrigerant suspended in the water. Between milkings, a small low-power cooling system slowly builds up a coating of ice around the copper tubes, and prevents icing of the pool over by continuously circulating the water in the pool. After the ice has achieved a thickness of 2–3 inches (51–76 mm), the cooling system stops running.

During milking, the milk entering the tank is primarily cooled by circulating the water in the pool around the walls of the inner milk chamber, and the melting of the ice. After the ice has melted sufficiently the cooling system restarts to assist the ice bank and restart the ice building.

Ice bank bulk tanks are better suited for small family farm operations where only single-phase electric power is available, and high-power cooling systems would be either too expensive or difficult to install.

=== Milk pre-cooling ===
For energy savings and quality reasons it is advisable to pre-cool the milk before it enters the tank using a plate or a tube cooler (shell and tube heat exchanger) supplied with chilled water from the well water, the ice builder or the condensing unit. The quicker milk is cooled after leaving the cow the better. This system achieves most of the cooling before the milk enters the tank, so that chilled milk, rather than warm milk, is being added to the already cooled milk in the tank.

=== Cooling temperature ===
Generic temperature for milk storage is 3 to 4 °C (37 to 39 °F). For raw milk cheese manufacturing, it would be advisable to keep the milk at 12 °C (54 °F), as milk characteristics will be kept in a better state.

The milk cooling tank is usually not completely filled at once. A 2 milking tank is designed to cool 50% of its capacity at once. A 4 milking tank is designed to cool 25% of its capacity at once, and a 6 milking tank is designed to cool 16.7% of its capacity at once.

The cooling performance depends on the number of milking it takes to completely fill the tank, the ambient temperature and the cooling time.

== Bulk tank cleaning systems ==
There are two primary methods of cleaning bulk tanks, via manual scrubbing or automatic washing. Both methods generally use four steps to clean the tank:

- prerinsing with water to wet the surface and rinse off remaining milk residue
- washing with hot soapy water
- rinsing with water to remove the soap
- final sanitizing rinse with an approved bulk tank sanitizer solution

=== Manual Scrubbing ===
Manual scrubbing requires the bulk tank to have large hinged covers that can be lifted open to permit easy access to the interior surfaces of the tank. It tends to be much more thorough than automatic methods since it permits the tank to be carefully inspected during the washing process. If the tank is not found to be cleaned well enough, a troublesome area can be given additional cleansing attention.

==== Manual Scrubbing Limitations ====
This job is difficult to perform for very large tanks, and becomes more difficult as the overall cross-section or diameter of the tank increases, requiring either a longer brush or a raised work platform around the tank to lift the cleaning worker to reach over the side of a tall tank.

=== Automatic Washing ===
Automatic bulk tank washing and are normally activated by the milk collection truck driver after each milk collection. The cleaning system operates similar to a consumer dishwasher and consists of one or more free-spinning high-pressure spray nozzles with tangential jets, with the spray nozzle mounted on the end of a flexible whip suspended down into the center of the interior. As the cleaning solution sprays out of the jet, the force of the expelled water causes the jet to spin around and the whip to wildly swing back and forth, spraying the cleaning solution randomly all over the interior of the tank.

==== Automatic Washing Limitations ====
Because no physical scrubbing occurs with automatic wash systems, the cleanser relies on surfactants and detergents to dissolve the fats left on the interior of the tank by the cream in the milk. However, this is not sufficient to remove milkstone buildup, and the tank may need to be washed occasionally with milkstone remover to remove this scale buildup that can harbor bacteria and contaminants.

Automatic scrubbing only cleans the interior of the tank. It is not capable of cleaning the exterior of the tank, and it does not do a good job of washing around the cover seals. While it is possible to just clean the interior and call it good enough, it does not provide the maximum sanitation of manually washing down the exterior of the tank following or during the automatic wash process. Also, some components that contact the milk such as the drain valve cannot be properly cleaned automatically without disassembling the valve and retaining washer and directly scrubbing in soapy water.

== Operating costs ==
Substantial reductions in running costs can be made when an ice builder is used in conjunction with off-peak electricity. Pre-cooling milk using a plate or a tube cooler supplied with mains or well water can also reduce costs and add to the cooling capacity of the tank.

Bulk tank condenser units, which are not an integral part of the tank, should be fitted in an adjacent, suitable and well ventilated place.

If at all possible, condenser units should not be fitted on a wall facing the sun. They should be installed in a way which allows them to draw in and discharge adequate quantities of air for efficient operation.

Bulk tank should be easily accessible by large bulk collection tankers and positioned so that the tanker approaches can be kept clean and free from cow traffic at all times.

Although tanks have been calibrated when first installed, bulk tank miscalibration is not uncommon and in some cases it can result in significant loss of income. Milk tanks calibrated on the low side, can cheat raw milk producers by up to 22 litres on each shipment. It is therefore advisable to re-calibrate a bulk tank.

== Other usage of bulk tanks ==
Stainless steel bulk tanks are also used to heat or cool a fluid or simply to keep it isolated and warm/cold. Because of the hygienical finishing of the inner and outer side of the tanks, almost any fluid can be stored: water, fruit juices, honey, wine, beer, ink, paint, cosmetics, aromatic food-additives, bacterial cultures, cleansers, oil, or blood.

== See also ==
- Milking pipeline
- Milking machine
