= Delvotest =

Delvotest is a broad spectrum microbial inhibition test used in dairy for testing antibiotic residue in milk and milk products. It is used to ensure milk safety and is produced by the global company DSM.

The dairy sector has a responsibility to prevent the presence of antibiotic residues in milk for health reasons, processing and economic reasons and legal responsibility to adhere to the Maximum Residue Levels as defined by law.

Delvotest is a testing method that is used throughout the dairy value chain by laboratories, dairy companies and farmers.

The test is validated by:

- France – CNIEL The French Dairy Industry Organization - Ministere de l’Agriculture, de l’Agroalimentaire et de la Forêt
- NL – Qlip – Dutch Quality and Assurance Organization for the Dairy Industry
- UK - CSL Central Laboratory and Executive Agency, UK Department for Environment Food and Rural Affairs (DEFRA
- Brazil – Agricultural Research Corporation, Ministry of Agriculture, Livestock and Food supply
- Nestle Research Center - validation of 27 antibiotic residues in raw cow's milk and milk-based products, Lausanne, Switzerland
- Nestlé Factory Laboratory, Shuangcheng, Italy; Centro Referenza Nazionale Qualità Latte Bovino IZSLER, Brescia, Italy (2015)
- Italy – AGRIS Agency for Agriculture Development in Sardegna
- Belgium - ILVO The Institute for Agricultural and Fisheries Research – government affiliated
- Poland - PIWET- The National Veterinary Research Institute, part of ministry of Agriculture
