= Pillow-plate heat exchanger =

Pillow-plate heat exchangers are a class of fully welded heat exchanger design, which exhibit a wavy, “pillow-shaped” surface formed by an inflation process. Compared to more conventional equipment, such as shell and tube and plate and frame heat exchangers, pillow plates are a quite young technology. Due to their geometric flexibility, they are used as well as “plate-type” heat exchangers and as jackets for cooling or heating of vessels. Pillow plate equipment is currently experiencing increased attention and implementation in process industry.

== Construction ==
Pillow plates are manufactured by an inflation process, where two thin metal sheets are spot-welded to each other over the entire surface by laser or resistance welding. The sides of the plates are sealed by seam welding, other than the connecting ports. Finally, the gap between the thin metal sheets is pressurized by a hydraulic fluid causing a plastic forming of the plates, which eventually leads to their characteristic wavy surface.

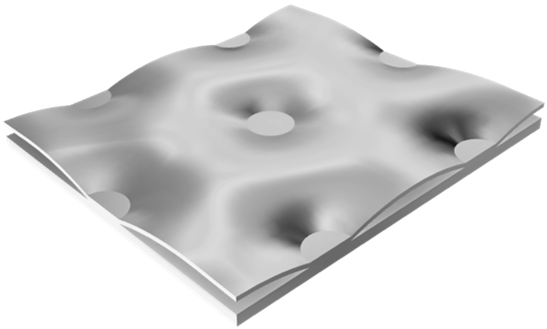
Single embossed pillow plate section.

In principle, there are two different types of pillow plates: single-embossed and double-embossed. The former commonly form the double walls of jacketed vessels, while the latter are assembled to a stack (bank) to manufacture pillow plate heat exchangers. Single-embossed pillow plates are formed when the base plate is significantly thicker than the top plate. The thinner top plate deforms, while the base plate remains plane.

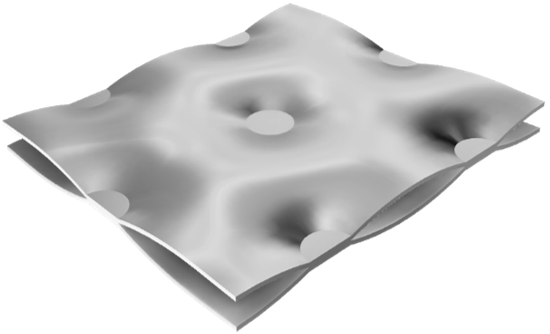
Double embossed pillow plate section.

Furthermore, pillow plates are commonly equipped with “baffle” seam weldings, which offer a targeted flow guidance in the pillow plate channels in cases, where flow distribution or fluid velocity might be an issue. A method for obtaining flow guidance by baffles in the channels between adjacent pillow plates in pillow plate heat exchangers, has recently been proposed in.

Due to their construction, pillow plates are hermetically sealed, they have a high structural stability and their manufacturing is mostly automated and highly flexible. Pillow plates can be operated at pressures > 100 MPa (15,000 psi) and temperatures of up to 800 °C (1,470 °F).

== Application ==
The application of pillow plates is very extensive, due to their favorable properties such as high geometric flexibility and good adaptivity to almost every process. Their implementation depends on their underlying construction, i.e. pillow plate banks or pillow plate jacketed tanks. The relatively flat external surface is easy to clean and suitable for high fouling or sanitary applications, but the internal surface has fine seams around each spot weld and is not easy to clean, therefore the internal surface is only suitable for non-fouling fluids like water, steam or refrigerants.

Pillow plate heat exchanger section.

=== Pillow plate banks (heat exchangers) ===
Pillow plate banks are typically used in applications involving liquid-liquid, gas-liquid, high viscosity or dirty media, low pressure loss requirements, condensation (e.g. top condensers), falling film evaporation (e.g. paper & pulp industry), reboilers, water chilling, drying of solids, flake ice generation (food industry) and more. They are also commonly used as immersion chillers (e.g. in electroplating), where the banks are immersed directly into the tank. Banks can be constructed to allow the individual plates to be separated from the stack, allowing easy cleaning or maintenance.

Pillow plate jacketed tank.

=== Pillow plate jacketed tanks ===
The most extensive application of pillow plates to date is with jacketed vessels, because of their flexibility, full surface area coverage for heat transfer, low fluid hold-up, favorable manufacturing costs & time, and easy cleaning, especially in sterile applications. The tanks can be equipped with multiple jackets over its surface, including also the tank bottom, e.g. conical or dished, and can include additional cylindrical shells inside the tank. Typical areas of implementation of pillow plate jacketed tanks are in food and beverage industry and in chemical and pharmaceutical industry. These jackets are also referred to as "dimple jackets".

=== Other ===
Due to their geometrical flexibility, pillow plates can be customized/adapted to almost any geometry to offer targeted heat transfer where it is needed. Some examples are cooling of pipes in thermal processes or even battery packs and electric motors for electric vehicles in automotive industry.

== Know-how and research on pillow plates ==
In contrast to more conventional heat exchangers, knowledge of thermohydraulic performance of pillow plates and experience with their design is limited. To overcome this bottleneck efforts are currently being made to develop commercial software tools. A rough overview of state-of-the-art on pillow plates can be found in.

Research on pillow plates can be subdivided into three main categories: geometrical analysis, analysis of fluid flow and heat transfer in pillow plates and analysis of fluid flow and heat transfer in the gap between adjacent pillow plates.

=== Geometrical analysis ===
Methods for the calculation of surface area, fluid hold-up volume, cross-sectional area and hydraulic diameter, needed in thermohydraulic calculations, have been proposed in. The mentioned geometrical parameters were determined using Finite Element Analysis (FEM), which imitates the inflation process during manufacturing of pillow plates. Moreover, theoretical burst pressures of pillow plates, could be estimated with FEM.

CFD simulation of fluid flow in a pillow plate channel. Flow represented by streamlines.

=== Fluid flow and heat transfer in pillow plates (inner channels) ===
The complex wavy geometry in pillow plate channels promotes fluid mixing, which leads to favorable heat transfer rates but is also unfavorable for pressure loss (formation of recirculation regions in the wake of welding spots). Information on fluid flow and heat transfer in pillow plates is available in, while correlations for the calculation of Darcy-Friction-Factor and Nusselt number in pillow plates over a wide range of geometrical parameters variations and process conditions is found in.

=== Fluid flow and heat transfer in the gap between adjacent pillow plates (outer channels) ===
Similar to the inner channels of pillow plates, the channels formed between adjacent pillow plates (outer channels) are also wavy and promote fluid mixing, which is in turn favorable for heat transfer rates. However, pressure loss in the outer channels is significantly lower than in the inner ones because of the absence of welding spots, which act as obstacles for the flow (flow around welding spots). Information on fluid flow and heat transfer in the outer channels of pillow plate heat exchangers is available in.

=== Falling film flow over the surface of pillow plates ===
The reliable design of condensers, falling film evaporators and water chillers requires detailed knowledge of fluid dynamics and heat transfer of the falling liquid film over the surface of the pillow plates.
