= Milking pipeline =

Dairy farm component

A milking pipeline or milk pipeline is a component of a dairy farm animal-milking operation which is used to transfer milk from the animals to a cooling and storage bulk tank.

== Setup ==
In small dairy farms with less than 100 cows, goats or sheep, the pipeline is installed above the animals' stalls and they are then are milked in sequence by moving down the row of stalls. The milking machine is a lightweight transportable hose assembly which is plugged into sealed access ports along the pipeline.

In the United States, for farmers who participate in the voluntary Dairy Herd Improvement Association, approximately once a month the milk volume from each animal is measured using additional portable metering devices inserted between the milker and the pipeline.

In large dairy farms with more than 100 animals, the pipeline is installed within a milking parlor that the animals walk through in order to be milked at fixed stations. Because the machine is stationary, it can include additional fixed equipment such as computerized milk-metering systems to measure volume, which would be cumbersome to use with portable milkers.

In both cases the pipeline is constructed out of stainless steel, which does not easily corrode and is resistant to most chemicals, though larger operations may use larger-diameter pipes in order to handle greater milk volumes.

== Transfer from pipeline to bulk tank ==
There is usually a transition point to move the milk from the pipeline under vacuum to the bulk tank, which is at normal atmospheric pressure. This is done by having the milk flow into a receiver bowl or globe, which is a large hollow glass container with electronic liquid-detecting probes in the center. As the milk rises to a certain height in the bowl, a transfer pump is used to push it through a one-way check valve and into a pipe that transfers it to the bulk tank. When the level has dropped far enough in the bowl, the transfer pump turns off. Without the check valve, the milk in the bulk tank could be sucked back into the receiver bowl when the pump is not running.

In the event of electronics or pump failure, there is also usually a secondary bowl attached to the top of the bowl, which contains a float and a diaphragm valve. If the main bowl overflows due to pump failure, the rising milk lifts the float in the secondary bowl, which will cut off vacuum to the entire milk pipeline and will prevent the milk or wash water from being sucked into the vacuum pump.

Some milk handling systems eliminate the bowl and transfer pump by having rubber seals on the bulk tank covers, to permit the entire tank to be under vacuum until milking is finished. Milk can then just flow directly by gravity from the pipeline into the bulk tank.

== Pipeline cleaning ==
320x240, 170 kilobit video of the pipeline cleaning process for a small 35-cow dairy farm, that has a traditional stanchion barn with haymow. The automatic washing system shown is a 1970s Bender Machine Works "Trol-O-Matic 5570", and the pipeline receiver and pump were made by Sta-Rite. See file description for larger and higher quality versions of this video.

The pipeline and all milk handling systems are cleaned after every milking session using a washing system that first rinses out the remaining milk and then flushes cleaning solution through the piping to kill bacteria and remove milkstone, a layer of scale mainly formed by cations like calcium and magnesium. The entire washing mechanism is operated very much like a household dishwasher with an automatic fill system, soap dispenser, and automatic drain opener.

The pipeline is usually set up so that the vacuum in the system that lifts milk up can also be used to drive the cleaning process. Rather than having a single line run to the bulk tank, typically a pair of lines transport milk by gravity flow to the receiver bowl and transfer pump. The high ends of these two lines are joined together to form a complete loop back to the receiver bowl.

Cleaning is accomplished by inserting a choke plug into one of the lines leading to the transfer pump, and sucking large volumes of water from a wash-water supply tank into the choked line. This choke plug is mounted on a rod, and is inserted into the line before cleaning, and pulled out for regular milking. Due to the choke, the water, which is sufficient to completely fill the pipe, is sucked up one side of the pipeline, over the high point joining the two pipeline sections, and then flows back to the receiver bowl and transfer pump through the unchoked line. The transfer pump is then used to move the cleaning solution from the receiver bowl back to the wash-water supply tank to restart the process.

Typically, the inlet ports on the receiver globe are designed so that large slugs of wash water moving at high speed will enter on a tangent to the sides of the globe and rapidly spin around inside to assist in vigorous cleaning of the globe's interior. It is normal for wash water to overflow out the top of the globe and for some wash water to be sucked into the overflow chamber to also flush it out. During cleaning the bottom of the overflow chamber is connected to a drain channel on the receiver globe to permit water to flow out.

For the small-farm pipeline, portable milkers are inserted into this cleaning loop usually by sucking the cleaning solution out of the wash supply tank through the milker claw and outputting from the milker hoses into the choked end of the line. When the water returns to the receiver bowl, the transfer pump returns the water back to the milker's water pickup tank.

== The 15-km Ameland milk pipeline ==
Between 1978 and 1994, a 15 km milk pipeline ran between the Dutch island of Ameland and Holwerd on the mainland, of which 8 km ran beneath the Wadden Sea. Every day, 30,000 litres of milk produced on the island were transported to be processed on the mainland. In 1994, the milk transport was abandoned.

== See also ==
- Dairy farming
- Bulk tank
