= Mastitis in dairy cattle =

Inflammation of the udder in cows

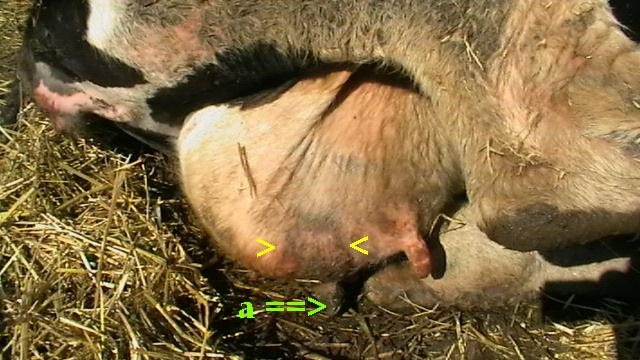
Gangrenous mastitis in a cow after 10 days. Green arrow indicates complete necrosis of the teat. Yellow arrows indicate the limits of the gangrenous tissue, but the necrotic area is not well delimited on the upper part of the udder.

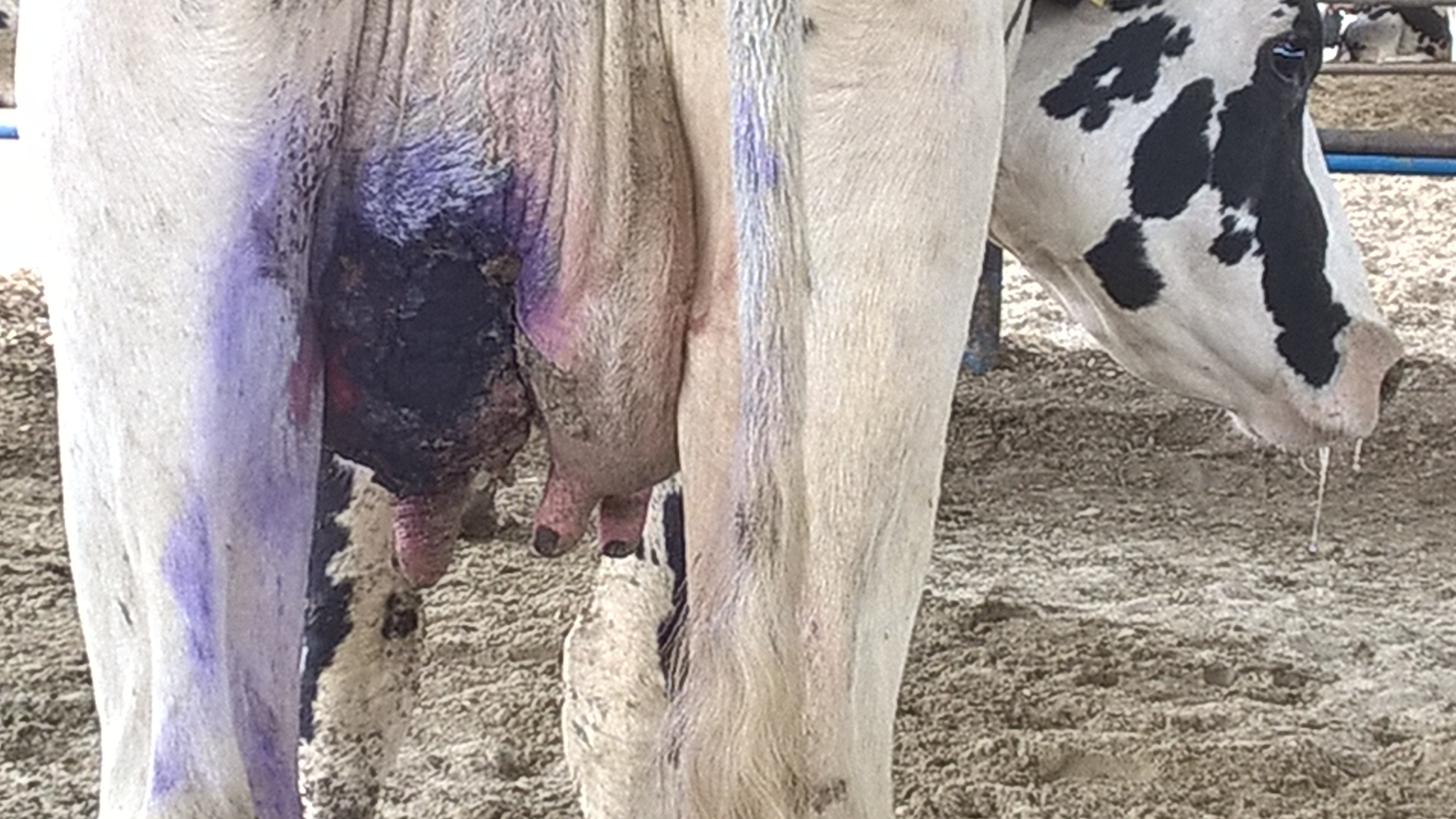
Dairy cow with gangrenous mastitis (rear quarter)

Bovine mastitis is the persistent, inflammatory reaction of the udder tissue due to physical trauma or microorganisms infections. Mastitis, a potentially fatal mammary gland infection, is the most common disease in dairy cattle in the United States and worldwide. It is also the most costly disease to the dairy industry. Milk from cows suffering from mastitis has an increased somatic cell count. Prevention and control of mastitis requires consistency in sanitizing the cow barn facilities, proper milking procedure and segregation of infected animals. Treatment of the disease is carried out by penicillin injection in combination with sulphar drug.

== Definition ==
Mastitis occurs when white blood cells (leukocytes) are released into the mammary gland, usually in response to bacteria invading the teat canal or occasionally by chemical, mechanical, or thermal trauma on the udder. Milk-secreting tissue and various ducts throughout the mammary gland are damaged due to toxins released by the bacteria resulting in reduced milk yield and quality.

== Identification ==
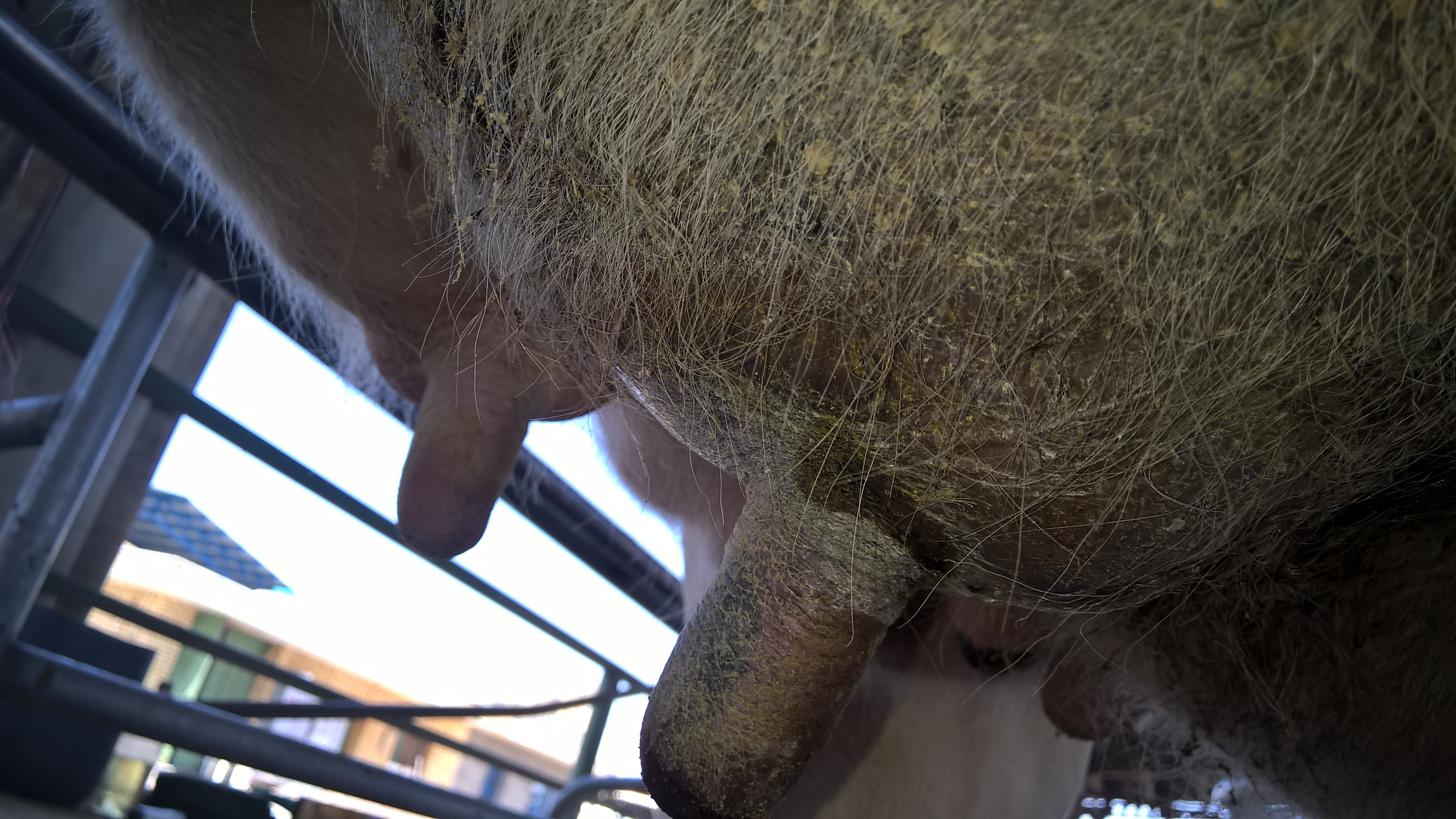
The quarter with gangrenous mastitis

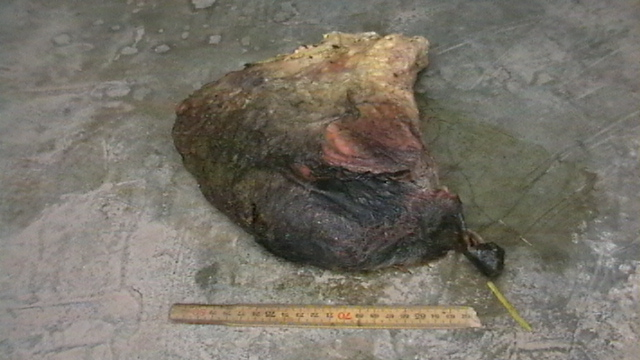
A gangrened udder (which sloughed naturally)

This disease can be identified by abnormalities in the udder such as swelling, heat, redness, hardness, or pain (if it is clinical). Other indications of mastitis may be abnormalities in milk such as a watery appearance, flakes, or clots. When infected with sub-clinical mastitis, a cow does not show any visible signs of infection or abnormalities in milk or on the udder.

== Mastitis-causing bacteria ==
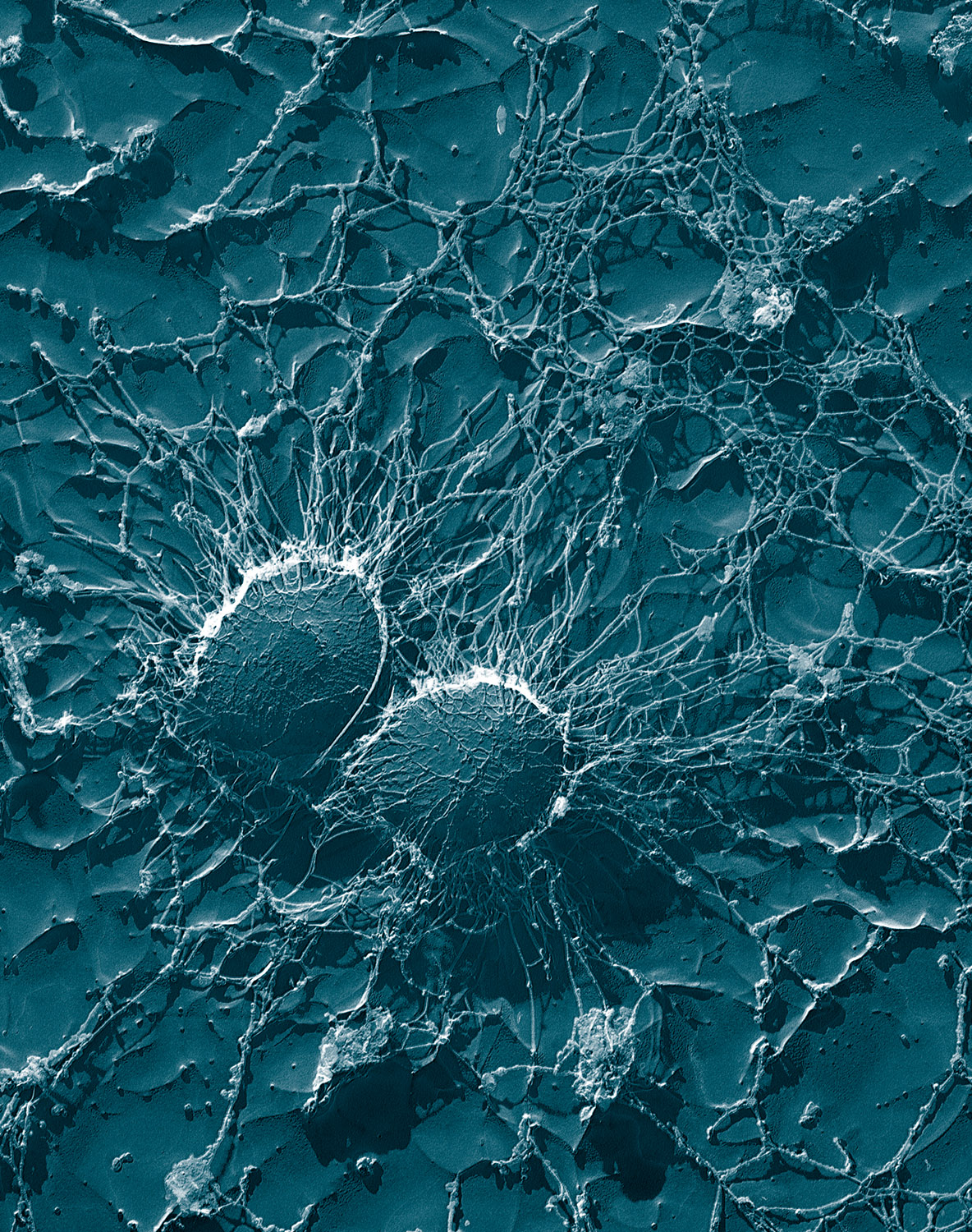
Bacterial cells of Staphylococcus aureus, one of the causal agents of mastitis in dairy cows. Its large capsule protects the organism from attack by the cow's immunological defenses.

Microorganisms that are known to cause mastitis include:

- Pseudomonas aeruginosa
- Staphylococcus aureus
- Staphylococcus epidermidis
- Streptococcus agalactiae
- Streptococcus uberis
- Brucella melitensis
- Corynebacterium bovis
- Mycoplasma spp. (including Mycoplasma bovis)
- Escherichia coli (E. coli)
- Klebsiella pneumoniae
- Klebsiella grimontii
- Klebsiella oxytoca
- Serratia marcescens
- Enterobacter aerogenes
- Pasteurella spp.
- Trueperella pyogenes (previously Arcanobacterium pyogenes)
- Proteus spp.
- Prototheca zopfii (achlorophyllic algae)
- Prototheca wickerhamii (achlorophyllic algae)

These microbes can be classified as environmental or contagious depending on mode and source of transmission.

== Types of mastitis ==
Mastitis may be classified according two different criteria: either according to the clinical symptoms or depending on the mode of transmission.

Clinical symptoms

- Clinical mastitis : The form in which macroscopic changes in the milk and udder of the milch animal is easily detectable by the milker.
- Sub-Clinical mastitis : The form in which the milk and udder of the milch animal appear normal and can be diagnosed by testing of milk samples for various compositional changes and presence of pathogens and somatic cells.
- per acute mastitis
- acute mastitis
- sub acute mastitis
- chronic mastitis : This form includes no pain in the udder but little compositional changes in the milk.

Mode of transmission

- Contagious mastitis also known as bovine mastitis
- Environmental mastitis
- Summer mastitis (which occurs in summer months in heifers or unmilked cows)

== Transmission ==
Mastitis is most often transmitted by repetitive contact with the milking machine, and through contaminated hands or materials.

Another route is via the oral-to-udder transmission among calves. Feeding calves on milk may introduce some mastitis causing bacteria strain in the oral cavity of the calf where it will stay dormant until it is transmitted elsewhere. Since grouped calves like to stimulate suckling, they will transmit the bacteria to the udder tissue of their fellow calves. The bacteria will lay dormant in the udder tissue as the calf grows until it begins to lactate. That is when the bacteria activates and causes mastitis. This calls for strict calf management practices to curb this route of transmission. Micro-organisms enter through the teat tip into the teat duct where they get colonized due to the presence of leftover milk in the duct and subsequently spread throughout the udder causing infection. The effect of unhygienic milking machines and incomplete milking can help in this infection.

== Effects on milk composition ==
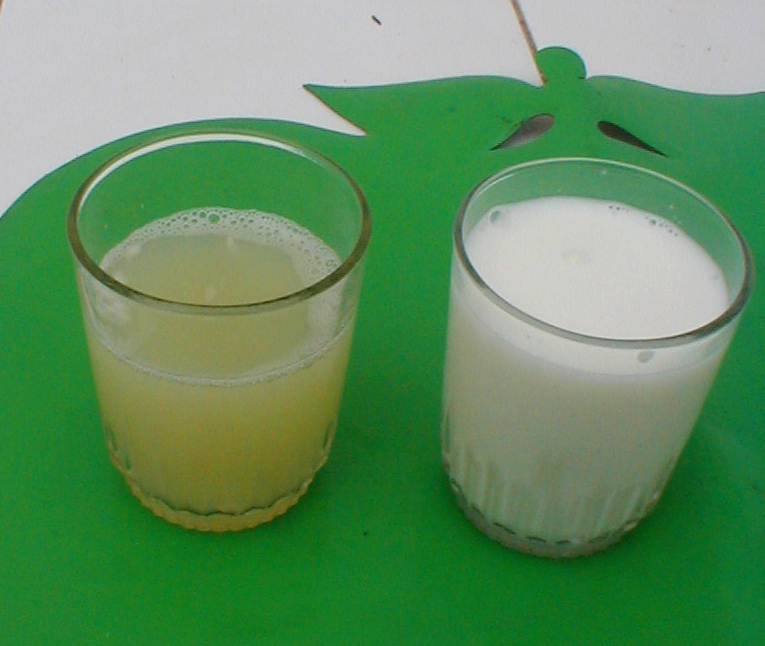
Serous exudate from udder in E. coli mastitis in cow (left), in comparison to normal milk (right)

Mastitis can cause a decline in potassium and an increase in lactoferrin. It also results in decreased casein, the major protein in milk. As most calcium in milk is associated with casein, the disruption of casein synthesis contributes to lowered calcium in milk. The milk protein continues to undergo further deterioration during processing and storage. Milk from cows with mastitis also has a higher somatic cell count. Generally speaking, the higher the somatic cell count, the lower the milk quality. It also has a high microbial count. This reduces its yield.

=== Constituents with increased constitution ===
The levels of total whey proteins (Mainly bovine serum albumin, immunoglobulins) (Na and Cl ions) and other ions (Cu, Fe, Zn) various enzymes and certain glycoproteins increase significantly. The pH of the milk increases too. Enzymes namely protease, lipase, aldolase, sorbitol, dehydrogenase also get increased.

=== Constituents with decreased constitution ===
The levels of lactose, fat, total casein (alpha and beta fractions decrease but gamma fraction increase ) some whey proteins (alpha-lactalbumin and beta-lactoglobulin) potassium and other minerals (Ca, Mg, P) decreases. Mastitic milk generally has lower SNF (solid-not-fat). Xanthine oxidase reduces by nearly half.

=== Detection ===
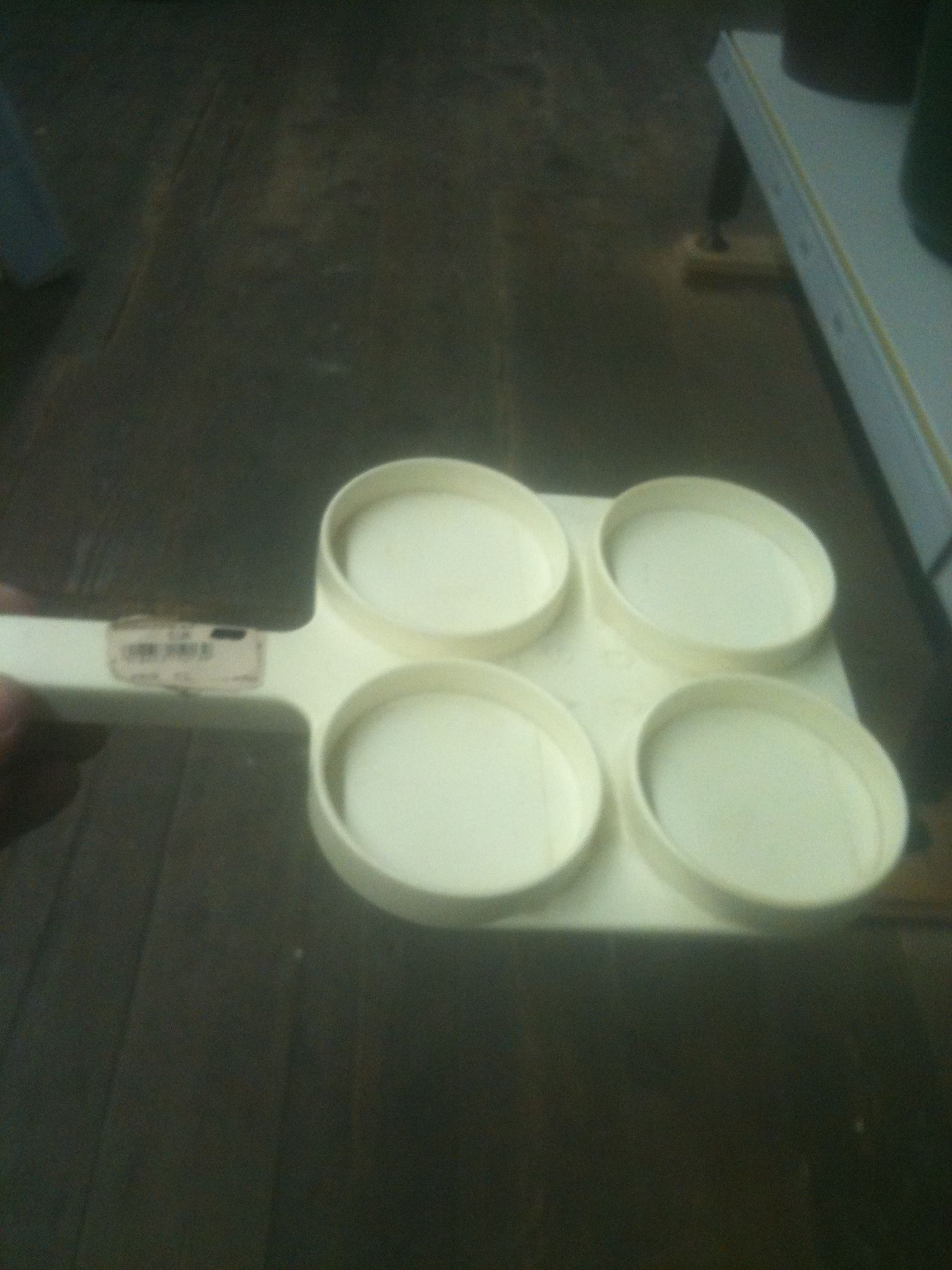
A plastic paddle used in the California mastitis test

Cattle affected by mastitis can be detected by examining the udder for inflammation and swelling, or by observing the consistency of the milk, which will often develop clots or change color when a cow is infected.

Another method of detection is the California mastitis test, which is designed to measure the milk's somatic cell count as a means for detecting inflammation and infection of the udder.

The pH value of mastitic milk is higher than that of normal milk. On mixing 5ml of milk with 1 ml of bromothymol blue, the appearance of blue green colour indicated mastitic milk which has a pH of 6.8 or more as against the grass green colour produced by normal milk that has a pH of 6.6.

Normal milk has a chloride content of 0.08 to 0.14% whereas abnormal milk has more than 0.14%. The chloride content of milk can be estimated by addition of silver nitrate solution and 2 to 3 drops of potassium chromate as an indicator, A yellow colour indicates that the milk is abnormal.

Catalase test is also used to detect catalase which is present only in mastitic milk.

Resazurin rennet test is based on the disturbance in the salt balance and increase in leucocyte content in mastitic milk. Coagulation of milk by rennet is sowed down due to disturbed salt balance and leucocytes reduce resazurin dye faster. Mastitic samples give delayed coagulation but faster resazurin reduction compared to normal milk

=== Treatment ===
Treatment is possible with antibiotics – such as penicillin, but milk from such cows is not marketable until drug residues have left the cow's system. Antibiotics may be systemic (injected into the body), or they may be forced upwards into the teat through the teat canal (intramammary infusion). Cows being treated may be marked with tape to alert dairy workers, and their milk is syphoned off and discarded. To determine whether the levels of antibiotic residuals are within regulatory requirements, special tests exist. Vaccinations for mastitis are available, but as they only reduce the severity of the condition, and cannot prevent reoccurring infections, they should be used in conjunction with a mastitis prevention program. Chronically infected cows can help. Ensuring that cows have clean, dry bedding decreases the risk of infection and transmission. Dairy workers should wear rubber gloves while milking, and machines should be cleaned regularly to decrease the incidence of transmission.

=== Prevention ===
A good milking routine is vital. This usually consists of applying a pre-milking teat dip or spray, such as an iodine spray, then wiping teats dry prior to milking. The milking machine is then applied. After milking, the teats can be cleaned again to remove any growth medium for bacteria. A post milking product such as iodine-propylene glycol dip is used as a disinfectant and a barrier between the open teat and the bacteria in the air. There is a risk of mastitis occurring post-milking as the teat orifice takes around 15 minutes to close after being milked. If the animal sits in a place contaminated with fæces or urine this can increase the risk of mastitis during the orifice closing period.

== Industry costs ==
This disease costs the US dairy industry about 1.7 to 2 billion USD each year. The annual economic loss attributed to mastitis in India, estimated at ₹2,370 crore, approximately $267.16 million USD each year.
