= 1724 in architecture =

The year 1724 in architecture involved some significant architectural events and new buildings.

== Events ==
- Work recommences on the Salon d'Hercule at the Palace of Versailles in France under Jacques Gabriel, after a break caused by the death of King Louis XIV in 1715.

== Buildings and structures ==
=== Buildings completed ===
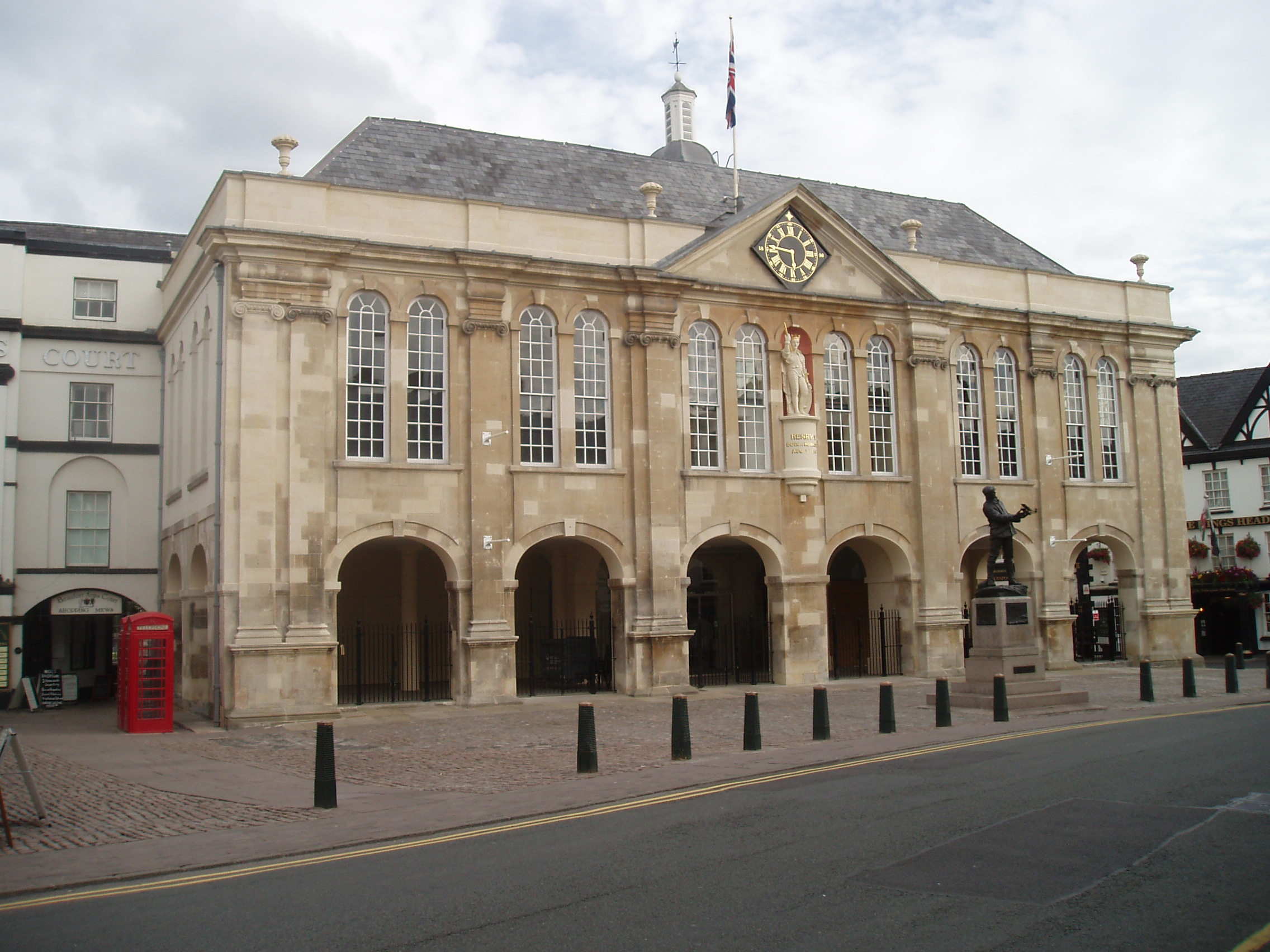
Shire Hall, Monmouth

- Cannons, a house in Edgware, Middlesex, England, built for James Brydges, 1st Duke of Chandos with façades designed by James Gibbs.
- Maids of Honour Row, terraced houses on Richmond Green, Richmond, Surrey, England.
- Chester Courthouse in Pennsylvania (North America).
- Shire Hall, Monmouth, Great Britain.
- Church of St. Edmund, Dudley, England.
- St. Stephanus, Bork, Germany.
- Cluj Jesuit Church in Transylvania (Romania).
- Stavropoleos Monastery in Bucharest, Romania.
- Rebuilt Sam Poo Kong temple in Semarang, Java.

== Awards ==
- Grand Prix de Rome, architecture: Jean-Pierre Le Tailleur de Boncourt.

== Births ==
- June 8 – John Smeaton, English civil engineer (died 1792)
- October – Hans Næss, Danish architect (died 1795)
- date unknown – Julien-David Le Roy, French architect and archaeologist (died 1803)

== Deaths ==
- January 24 – William Dickinson, English architect (born c.1670)
- March 8 – Enrico Zuccalli, Swiss architect working for the Wittelsbach regents of Bavaria and Cologne (born c.1642)
- date unknown – Pierre Cailleteau, French architect and interior designer (born 1655)
