= List of municipalities in Germany =

Below is a list of municipalities in Germany with over 20,000 inhabitants in December 2022. The list is sorted by population and gives the state of every municipality. In cases where the municipality's name in German differs from its name in English, the English name is listed first with the German name given in parentheses.

In German, the term Mittelstadt (literally "middle [sized] city") is used for a settlement with 20,000 to 99,999 inhabitants, while a settlement of 100,000 or more is called a Großstadt (literally "big city", but usually translated "city"). Population is counted either in terms of a continuous urban area or by municipal boundaries. If going by municipal borders, that also makes this a list of Groß- and Mittelstädte.

The data basis is from December 31, 2022.

== Großstädte ==
	City	Federal state	Population in 2022
1	Berlin	Berlin	3,755,251
2	Hamburg	Hamburg	1,892,122
3	Munich (München)	Bavaria	1,512,491
4	Cologne (Köln)	North Rhine-Westphalia	1,084,831
5	Frankfurt	Hesse	773,068
6	Stuttgart	Baden-Württemberg	632,865
7	Düsseldorf	North Rhine-Westphalia	629,047
8	Leipzig	Saxony	616,093
9	Dortmund	North Rhine-Westphalia	593,317
10	Essen	North Rhine-Westphalia	584,580
11	Bremen	Free Hanseatic City of Bremen	569,396
12	Dresden	Saxony	563,311
13	Hanover (Hannover)	Lower Saxony	545,045
14	Nuremberg (Nürnberg)	Bavaria	523,026
15	Duisburg	North Rhine-Westphalia	502,211
16	Bochum	North Rhine-Westphalia	365,742
17	Wuppertal	North Rhine-Westphalia	358,876
18	Bielefeld	North Rhine-Westphalia	338,332
19	Bonn	North Rhine-Westphalia	336,465
20	Münster	North Rhine-Westphalia	320,946
21	Mannheim	Baden-Württemberg	315,554
22	Karlsruhe	Baden-Württemberg	308,707
23	Augsburg	Bavaria	301,033
24	Wiesbaden	Hesse	283,083
25	Mönchengladbach	North Rhine-Westphalia	268,465
26	Gelsenkirchen	North Rhine-Westphalia	263,000
27	Aachen	North Rhine-Westphalia	252,136
28	Braunschweig	Lower Saxony	251,804
29	Chemnitz	Saxony	248,563
30	Kiel	Schleswig-Holstein	247,717
31	Halle	Saxony-Anhalt	242,083
32	Magdeburg	Saxony-Anhalt	239,364
33	Freiburg	Baden-Württemberg	236,140
34	Krefeld	North Rhine-Westphalia	228,426
35	Mainz	Rhineland-Palatinate	220,552
36	Lübeck	Schleswig-Holstein	218,095
37	Erfurt	Thuringia	214,969
38	Oberhausen	North Rhine-Westphalia	210,824
39	Rostock	Mecklenburg-Vorpommern	209,920
40	Kassel	Hesse	204,202
41	Hagen	North Rhine-Westphalia	189,783
42	Potsdam	Brandenburg	185,750
43	Saarbrücken	Saarland	181,959
44	Hamm	North Rhine-Westphalia	180,849
45	Ludwigshafen	Rhineland-Palatinate	174,265
46	Oldenburg	Lower Saxony	172,830
47	Mülheim	North Rhine-Westphalia	172,404
48	Osnabrück	Lower Saxony	167,366
49	Leverkusen	North Rhine-Westphalia	165,748
50	Heidelberg	Baden-Württemberg	162,273
51	Darmstadt	Hesse	162,243
52	Solingen	North Rhine-Westphalia	160,643
53	Regensburg	Bavaria	157,443
54	Herne	North Rhine-Westphalia	157,368
55	Paderborn	North Rhine-Westphalia	154,755
56	Neuss	North Rhine-Westphalia	154,139
57	Ingolstadt	Bavaria	141,029
58	Offenbach	Hesse	134,170
59	Fürth	Bavaria	131,433
60	Ulm	Baden-Württemberg	128,928
61	Heilbronn	Baden-Württemberg	128,334
62	Pforzheim	Baden-Württemberg	127,849
63	Würzburg	Bavaria	127,810
64	Wolfsburg	Lower Saxony	125,961
65	Göttingen	Lower Saxony	118,946
66	Bottrop	North Rhine-Westphalia	118,113
67	Reutlingen	Baden-Württemberg	117,547
68	Erlangen	Bavaria	116,562
69	Bremerhaven	Free Hanseatic City of Bremen	115,468
70	Koblenz	Rhineland-Palatinate	115,268
71	Bergisch Gladbach	North Rhine-Westphalia	112,712
72	Remscheid	North Rhine-Westphalia	112,613
73	Trier	Rhineland-Palatinate	112,195
74	Recklinghausen	North Rhine-Westphalia	111,734
75	Jena	Thuringia	111,191
76	Moers	North Rhine-Westphalia	105,287
77	Salzgitter	Lower Saxony	104,548
78	Siegen	North Rhine-Westphalia	102,560
79	Gütersloh	North Rhine-Westphalia	102,393
80	Hildesheim	Lower Saxony	101,858
81	Hanau	Hesse	101,364
82	Kaiserslautern	Rhineland-Palatinate	101,228

== Mittelstädte ==
	City	Federal state	Population
83	Cottbus	Brandenburg	99,515
84	Schwerin	Mecklenburg-Vorpommern	98,596
85	Witten	North Rhine-Westphalia	95,897
86	Esslingen	Baden-Württemberg	94,941
87	Ludwigsburg	Baden-Württemberg	94,157
88	Giessen	Hesse	94,146
89	Gera	Thuringia	93,634
90	Düren	North Rhine-Westphalia	93,207
91	Tübingen	Baden-Württemberg	92,811
92	Flensburg	Schleswig-Holstein	92,550
93	Iserlohn	North Rhine-Westphalia	92,540
94	Villingen-Schwenningen	Baden-Württemberg	88,213
95	Ratingen	North Rhine-Westphalia	87,388
96	Zwickau	Saxony	87,172
97	Lünen	North Rhine-Westphalia	86,868
98	Konstanz	Baden-Württemberg	85,859
99	Worms	Rhineland-Palatinate	84,646
100	Marl	North Rhine-Westphalia	84,331
101	Minden	North Rhine-Westphalia	83,076
102	Velbert	North Rhine-Westphalia	82,445
103	Norderstedt	Schleswig-Holstein	81,880
104	Bamberg	Bavaria	79,935
105	Dessau-Roßlau	Saxony-Anhalt	79,655
106	Neumünster	Schleswig-Holstein	79,502
107	Delmenhorst	Lower Saxony	78,385
108	Viersen	North Rhine-Westphalia	78,208
109	Rheine	North Rhine-Westphalia	77,893
110	Marburg	Hesse	77,845
111	Lüneburg	Lower Saxony	76,837
112	Dorsten	North Rhine-Westphalia	76,720
113	Troisdorf	North Rhine-Westphalia	76,251
114	Wilhelmshaven	Lower Saxony	76,089
115	Gladbeck	North Rhine-Westphalia	75,889
116	Landshut	Bavaria	75,457
117	Detmold	North Rhine-Westphalia	75,089
118	Bayreuth	Bavaria	74,506
119	Arnsberg	North Rhine-Westphalia	74,323
120	Castrop-Rauxel	North Rhine-Westphalia	73,795
121	Brandenburg	Brandenburg	73,609
122	Aschaffenburg	Bavaria	72,444
123	Bocholt	North Rhine-Westphalia	71,930
124	Lüdenscheid	North Rhine-Westphalia	71,865
125	Celle	Lower Saxony	70,138
126	Kempten	Bavaria	70,056
127	Fulda	Hesse	69,968
128	Lippstadt	North Rhine-Westphalia	68,890
129	Aalen	Baden-Württemberg	68,816
130	Dinslaken	North Rhine-Westphalia	67,762
131	Herford	North Rhine-Westphalia	67,459
132	Rüsselsheim	Hesse	67,277
133	Kerpen	North Rhine-Westphalia	67,239
134	Neuwied	Rhineland-Palatinate	65,986
135	Weimar	Thuringia	65,620
136	Dormagen	North Rhine-Westphalia	65,147
137	Sindelfingen	Baden-Württemberg	64,995
138	Plauen	Saxony	64,763
139	Grevenbroich	North Rhine-Westphalia	64,596
140	Rosenheim	Bavaria	64,403
141	Neubrandenburg	Mecklenburg-Vorpommern	63,989
142	Friedrichshafen	Baden-Württemberg	62,932
143	Herten	North Rhine-Westphalia	62,473
144	Bergheim	North Rhine-Westphalia	62,376
145	Schwäbisch Gmünd	Baden-Württemberg	62,325
146	Offenburg	Baden-Württemberg	61,670
147	Garbsen	Lower Saxony	61,349
148	Wesel	North Rhine-Westphalia	61,330
149	Neu-Ulm	Bavaria	61,043
150	Hürth	North Rhine-Westphalia	60,969
151	Unna	North Rhine-Westphalia	60,892
152	Langenfeld	North Rhine-Westphalia	59,783
153	Euskirchen	North Rhine-Westphalia	59,772
154	Greifswald	Mecklenburg-Vorpommern	59,691
155	Stralsund	Mecklenburg-Vorpommern	59,363
156	Göppingen	Baden-Württemberg	59,053
157	Frankfurt (Oder)	Brandenburg	58,230
158	Hamelin	Lower Saxony	57,905
159	Meerbusch	North Rhine-Westphalia	57,422
160	Baden-Baden	Baden-Württemberg	57,025
161	Görlitz	Saxony	56,574
162	Lingen	Lower Saxony	56,542
163	Stolberg (Rhld.)	North Rhine-Westphalia	56,455
164	Sankt Augustin	North Rhine-Westphalia	56,369
165	Waiblingen	Baden-Württemberg	56,081
166	Eschweiler	North Rhine-Westphalia	56,049
167	Hilden	North Rhine-Westphalia	55,815
168	Pulheim	North Rhine-Westphalia	55,530
169	Langenhagen	Lower Saxony	55,367
170	Nordhorn	Lower Saxony	55,242
171	Bad Homburg	Hesse	54,996
172	Bad Salzuflen	North Rhine-Westphalia	54,808
173	Schweinfurt	Bavaria	54,675
174	Hattingen	North Rhine-Westphalia	54,637
175	Wetzlar	Hesse	54,187
176	Neustadt (Weinstr.)	Rhineland-Palatinate	53,981
177	Passau	Bavaria	53,907
178	Kleve	North Rhine-Westphalia	53,388
179	Ahlen	North Rhine-Westphalia	53,348
180	Frechen	North Rhine-Westphalia	52,811
181	Wolfenbüttel	Lower Saxony	52,681
182	Bad Kreuznach	Rhineland-Palatinate	52,529
183	Menden	North Rhine-Westphalia	52,485
184	Ibbenbüren	North Rhine-Westphalia	52,421
185	Gummersbach	North Rhine-Westphalia	52,001
186	Ravensburg	Baden-Württemberg	51,482
187	Böblingen	Baden-Württemberg	51,460
188	Peine	Lower Saxony	51,411
189	Speyer	Rhineland-Palatinate	51,368
190	Rastatt	Baden-Württemberg	51,310
191	Elmshorn	Schleswig-Holstein	50,772
192	Emden	Lower Saxony	50,535
193	Goslar	Lower Saxony	50,203
194	Willich	North Rhine-Westphalia	50,144
195	Heidenheim an der Brenz	Baden-Württemberg	50,025
196	Erftstadt	North Rhine-Westphalia	49,882
197	Lörrach	Baden-Württemberg	49,876
198	Gronau (Westf.)	North Rhine-Westphalia	49,824
199	Leonberg	Baden-Württemberg	49,512
200	Rheda-Wiedenbrück	North Rhine-Westphalia	49,486
201	Bad Oeynhausen	North Rhine-Westphalia	49,477
202	Singen	Baden-Württemberg	49,441
203	Freising	Bavaria	49,339
204	Bergkamen	North Rhine-Westphalia	49,263
205	Straubing	Bavaria	49,164
206	Lahr	Baden-Württemberg	49,074
207	Frankenthal	Rhineland-Palatinate	49,051
209	Bornheim	North Rhine-Westphalia	49,025
209	Soest	North Rhine-Westphalia	48,607
210	Cuxhaven	Lower Saxony	48,562
211	Stade	Lower Saxony	48,353
212	Alsdorf	North Rhine-Westphalia	48,328
213	Dachau	Bavaria	48,195
214	Hennef (Sieg)	North Rhine-Westphalia	48,002
215	Oranienburg	Brandenburg	47,752
216	Landau	Rhineland-Palatinate	47,610
217	Dülmen	North Rhine-Westphalia	47,468
218	Melle	Lower Saxony	47,228
219	Oberursel (Taunus)	Hesse	47,042
220	Herzogenrath	North Rhine-Westphalia	46,941
221	Neunkirchen	Saarland	46,882
222	Schwerte	North Rhine-Westphalia	46,658
223	Hof	Bavaria	46,656
224	Bruchsal	Baden-Württemberg	46,587
225	Rodgau	Hesse	46,426
226	Albstadt	Baden-Württemberg	46,422
227	Filderstadt	Baden-Württemberg	46,188
228	Bünde	North Rhine-Westphalia	46,030
229	Gotha	Thuringia	46,019
231	Memmingen	Bavaria	45,857
232	Kaufbeuren	Bavaria	45,792
233	Wittenberg	Saxony-Anhalt	45,535
234	Weinheim	Baden-Württemberg	45,275
235	Neustadt am Rübenberge	Lower Saxony	45,262
236	Lehrte	Lower Saxony	44,823
237	Falkensee	Brandenburg	44,806
238	Brühl	North Rhine-Westphalia	44,804
239	Rottenburg am Neckar	Baden-Württemberg	44,653
240	Pinneberg	Schleswig-Holstein	44,279
241	Kaarst	North Rhine-Westphalia	44,253
242	Erkelenz	North Rhine-Westphalia	44,215
243	Wismar	Mecklenburg-Vorpommern	43,878
244	Erkrath	North Rhine-Westphalia	43,856
245	Bietigheim-Bissingen	Baden-Württemberg	43,755
246	Bernau bei Berlin	Brandenburg	43,685
247	Gifhorn	Lower Saxony	43,625
248	Borken	North Rhine-Westphalia	43,489
249	Heinsberg	North Rhine-Westphalia	43,476
250	Nettetal	North Rhine-Westphalia	43,095
251	Kamen	North Rhine-Westphalia	43,058
252	Weiden in der Oberpfalz	Bavaria	43,052
253	Monheim am Rhein	North Rhine-Westphalia	43,050
254	Aurich	Lower Saxony	42,970
255	Laatzen	Lower Saxony	42,675
256	Amberg	Bavaria	42,534
257	Seevetal	Lower Saxony	42,449
258	Eisenach	Thuringia	42,408
259	Homburg	Saarland	42,297
260	Dreieich	Hesse	42,260
261	Ansbach	Bavaria	42,221
262	Bensheim	Hesse	42,089
263	Siegburg	North Rhine-Westphalia	42,049
264	Kirchheim unter Teck	Baden-Württemberg	41,907
265	Schwäbisch Hall	Baden-Württemberg	41,898
266	Coburg	Bavaria	41,842
267	Wunstorf	Lower Saxony	41,689
268	Königswinter	North Rhine-Westphalia	41,495
269	Eberswalde	Brandenburg	41,461
270	Nürtingen	Baden-Württemberg	41,403
271	Germering	Bavaria	41,355
272	Nordhausen	Thuringia	41,339
273	Hückelhoven	North Rhine-Westphalia	41,301
274	Schwabach	Bavaria	41,227
275	Buxtehude	Lower Saxony	40,919
276	Buchholz in der Nordheide	Lower Saxony	40,810
277	Neumarkt in der Oberpfalz	Bavaria	40,808
278	Pirmasens	Rhineland-Palatinate	40,682
279	Lemgo	North Rhine-Westphalia	40,594
280	Freiberg	Saxony	40,485
281	Halberstadt	Saxony-Anhalt	40,457
282	Leinfelden-Echterdingen	Baden-Württemberg	40,420
283	Hofheim	Hesse	40,371
284	Löhne	North Rhine-Westphalia	40,265
285	Ahaus	North Rhine-Westphalia	40,245
286	Schorndorf	Baden-Württemberg	40,204
287	Völklingen	Saarland	40,192
288	Maintal	Hesse	39,815
289	Ostfildern	Baden-Württemberg	39,806
290	Ettlingen	Baden-Württemberg	39,699
291	Freital	Saxony	39,558
292	Neu-Isenburg	Hesse	39,287
293	Niederkassel	North Rhine-Westphalia	39,281
294	Langen	Hesse	39,217
295	Mettmann	North Rhine-Westphalia	39,134
296	Ilmenau	Thuringia	39,127
297	Stendal	Saxony-Anhalt	39,105
298	Pirna	Saxony	39,054
299	Weißenfels	Saxony-Anhalt	39,041
300	Königs Wusterhausen	Brandenburg	38,929
301	Kamp-Lintfort	North Rhine-Westphalia	38,665
302	Würselen	North Rhine-Westphalia	38,598
303	Papenburg	Lower Saxony	38,556
304	Greven	North Rhine-Westphalia	38,207
305	Wesseling	North Rhine-Westphalia	38,192
306	Kehl	Baden-Württemberg	38,154
307	Bautzen	Saxony	38,140
308	Haltern am See	North Rhine-Westphalia	38,117
309	Backnang	Baden-Württemberg	37,957
310	Bitterfeld-Wolfen	Saxony-Anhalt	37,894
311	Fürstenfeldbruck	Bavaria	37,695
312	Warendorf	North Rhine-Westphalia	37,616
313	Tuttlingen	Baden-Württemberg	37,458
314	Beckum	North Rhine-Westphalia	37,333
315	Cloppenburg	Lower Saxony	37,056
316	Coesfeld	North Rhine-Westphalia	37,030
317	Suhl	Thuringia	37,009
318	Erding	Bavaria	36,813
319	Sinsheim	Baden-Württemberg	36,601
320	Porta Westfalica	North Rhine-Westphalia	36,374
321	Emsdetten	North Rhine-Westphalia	36,354
322	Winsen (Luhe)	Lower Saxony	36,295
323	Mühlhausen	Thuringia	36,226
324	Voerde	North Rhine-Westphalia	36,196
325	Meppen	Lower Saxony	36,117
326	Limburg an der Lahn	Hesse	36,053
327	Ingelheim am Rhein	Rhineland-Palatinate	36,002
328	Crailsheim	Baden-Württemberg	35,760
329	Bad Vilbel	Hesse	35,758
330	Leer	Lower Saxony	35,663
331	Lage	North Rhine-Westphalia	35,423
332	Mörfelden-Walldorf	Hesse	35,291
333	Goch	North Rhine-Westphalia	35,270
334	Sankt Ingbert	Saarland	35,216
335	Datteln	North Rhine-Westphalia	35,191
336	Deggendorf	Bavaria	35,172
337	Barsinghausen	Lower Saxony	35,156
338	Steinfurt	North Rhine-Westphalia	35,102
339	Balingen	Baden-Württemberg	34,945
340	Dietzenbach	Hesse	34,928
341	Kempen	North Rhine-Westphalia	34,841
342	Seelze	Lower Saxony	34,742
343	Wermelskirchen	North Rhine-Westphalia	34,739
344	Saarlouis	Saarland	34,717
345	Wedel	Schleswig-Holstein	34,538
346	Viernheim	Hesse	34,534
347	Zweibrücken	Rhineland-Palatinate	34,534
348	Ahrensburg	Schleswig-Holstein	34,509
349	Merseburg	Saxony-Anhalt	34,509
350	Geldern	North Rhine-Westphalia	34,298
351	Korschenbroich	North Rhine-Westphalia	34,187
352	Kornwestheim	Baden-Württemberg	34,130
353	Radebeul	Saxony	34,096
354	Hemer	North Rhine-Westphalia	34,024
355	Biberach an der Riß	Baden-Württemberg	34,008
356	Stuhr	Lower Saxony	33,952
357	Uelzen	Lower Saxony	33,934
358	Vechta	Lower Saxony	33,769
359	Rheinfelden (Baden)	Baden-Württemberg	33,581
360	Schwedt	Brandenburg	33,524
361	Bad Nauheim	Hesse	33,445
362	Jülich	North Rhine-Westphalia	33,158
363	Forchheim	Bavaria	32,972
364	Lampertheim	Hesse	32,870
365	Delbrück	North Rhine-Westphalia	32,774
366	Achim	Lower Saxony	32,752
367	Herrenberg	Baden-Württemberg	32,649
368	Fürstenwalde	Brandenburg	32,646
369	Geesthacht	Schleswig-Holstein	32,336
370	Naumburg	Saxony-Anhalt	32,289
371	Bernburg	Saxony-Anhalt	32,261
372	Itzehoe	Schleswig-Holstein	32,258
373	Georgsmarienhütte	Lower Saxony	32,190
374	Bramsche	Lower Saxony	32,179
375	Nienburg/Weser	Lower Saxony	32,126
376	Radolfzell	Baden-Württemberg	32,043
377	Wernigerode	Saxony-Anhalt	32,024
378	Ganderkesee	Lower Saxony	31,939
379	Oer-Erkenschwick	North Rhine-Westphalia	31,838
380	Weyhe	Lower Saxony	31,672
381	Emmerich am Rhein	North Rhine-Westphalia	31,544
382	Geestland	Lower Saxony	31,507
383	Neuruppin	Brandenburg	31,422
384	Hoyerswerda	Saxony	31,356
385	Altenburg	Thuringia	31,315
386	Burgdorf	Lower Saxony	31,287
387	Kreuztal	North Rhine-Westphalia	31,197
388	Rheinberg	North Rhine-Westphalia	31,150
389	Gevelsberg	North Rhine-Westphalia	31,097
390	Werl	North Rhine-Westphalia	31,045
391	Lohmar	North Rhine-Westphalia	30,846
392	Walsrode	Lower Saxony	30,819
393	Friedberg (Hessen)	Hesse	30,818
394	Taunusstein	Hesse	30,810
395	Weil am Rhein	Baden-Württemberg	30,769
396	Einbeck	Lower Saxony	30,728
397	Osterholz-Scharmbeck	Lower Saxony	30,659
398	Bad Hersfeld	Hesse	30,652
399	Ennepetal	North Rhine-Westphalia	30,652
400	Haan	North Rhine-Westphalia	30,542
401	Neuburg an der Donau	Bavaria	30,467
402	Friedberg	Bavaria	30,407
403	Schönebeck	Saxony-Anhalt	30,389
404	Andernach	Rhineland-Palatinate	30,277
405	Gaggenau	Baden-Württemberg	30,250
406	Bretten	Baden-Württemberg	30,073
407	Merzig	Saarland	30,051
408	Meschede	North Rhine-Westphalia	30,025
409	Schwandorf	Bavaria	29,990
410	Rietberg	North Rhine-Westphalia	29,919
411	Wedemark	Lower Saxony	29,814
412	Bad Zwischenahn	Lower Saxony	29,803
413	Rendsburg	Schleswig-Holstein	29,743
414	Werne	North Rhine-Westphalia	29,680
415	Waltrop	North Rhine-Westphalia	29,644
416	Oelde	North Rhine-Westphalia	29,644
417	Güstrow	Mecklenburg-Vorpommern	29,556
418	Landsberg am Lech	Bavaria	29,551
419	Unterschleißheim	Bavaria	29,551
420	Northeim	Lower Saxony	29,440
421	Tönisvorst	North Rhine-Westphalia	29,319
422	Vaihingen an der Enz	Baden-Württemberg	29,305
423	Mühlheim am Main	Hesse	29,252
424	Winnenden	Baden-Württemberg	29,245
425	Saalfeld	Thuringia	29,224
426	Blankenfelde-Mahlow	Brandenburg	29,159
427	Bühl	Baden-Württemberg	29,133
428	Springe	Lower Saxony	29,113
429	Kelkheim	Hesse	29,112
430	Riesa	Saxony	29,076
431	Meissen	Saxony	29,011
432	Rösrath	North Rhine-Westphalia	28,889
433	Emmendingen	Baden-Württemberg	28,856
434	Idar-Oberstein	Rhineland-Palatinate	28,851
435	Rödermark	Hesse	28,834
436	Schwelm	North Rhine-Westphalia	28,723
437	Höxter	North Rhine-Westphalia	28,709
438	Geislingen an der Steige	Baden-Württemberg	28,655
439	Mechernich	North Rhine-Westphalia	28,567
440	Reinbek	Schleswig-Holstein	28,536
441	Hattersheim am Main	Hesse	28,528
442	Verden an der Aller	Lower Saxony	28,526
443	Ludwigsfelde	Brandenburg	28,424
444	Baunatal	Hesse	28,339
445	Henstedt-Ulzburg	Schleswig-Holstein	28,323
446	Geilenkirchen	North Rhine-Westphalia	28,252
447	Kevelaer	North Rhine-Westphalia	28,232
448	Königsbrunn	Bavaria	28,231
449	Grimma	Saxony	28,205
450	Arnstadt	Thuringia	28,124
451	Wegberg	North Rhine-Westphalia	28,074
452	Leichlingen	North Rhine-Westphalia	28,048
453	Zeitz	Saxony-Anhalt	27,976
454	Neukirchen-Vluyn	North Rhine-Westphalia	27,956
455	Olching	Bavaria	27,927
456	Griesheim	Hesse	27,837
457	Lohne (Oldenburg)	Lower Saxony	27,814
458	Sundern (Sauerland)	North Rhine-Westphalia	27,741
459	Teltow	Brandenburg	27,697
460	Baesweiler	North Rhine-Westphalia	27,620
461	Wetter (Ruhr)	North Rhine-Westphalia	27,550
462	Garmisch-Partenkirchen	Bavaria	27,482
463	Schloß Holte-Stukenbrock	North Rhine-Westphalia	27,467
464	Wangen im Allgäu	Baden-Württemberg	27,411
465	Overath	North Rhine-Westphalia	27,405
466	Butzbach	Hesse	27,402
467	Strausberg	Brandenburg	27,344
468	Ehingen (Donau)	Baden-Württemberg	27,276
469	Hamminkeln	North Rhine-Westphalia	27,248
470	Leimen (Baden)	Baden-Württemberg	27,142
471	Hohen Neuendorf	Brandenburg	27,139
472	Rheinbach	North Rhine-Westphalia	27,102
473	Weinstadt	Baden-Württemberg	27,088
474	Wiesloch	Baden-Württemberg	27,049
475	Werder (Havel)	Brandenburg	27,039
476	Heppenheim	Hesse	26,946
477	Pfaffenhofen an der Ilm	Bavaria	26,943
478	Hennigsdorf	Brandenburg	26,728
479	Heiligenhaus	North Rhine-Westphalia	26,681
480	Bad Neuenahr-Ahrweiler	Rhineland-Palatinate	26,669
481	Aschersleben	Saxony-Anhalt	26,604
482	Remseck am Neckar	Baden-Württemberg	26,549
483	Neckarsulm	Baden-Württemberg	26,495
484	Achern	Baden-Württemberg	26,471
485	Lauf an der Pegnitz	Bavaria	26,420
486	Groß-Gerau	Hesse	26,418
487	Mühlacker	Baden-Württemberg	26,394
488	Weiterstadt	Hesse	26,322
489	Bingen am Rhein	Rhineland-Palatinate	26,309
490	Nordenham	Lower Saxony	26,308
491	Zirndorf	Bavaria	26,234
492	Selm	North Rhine-Westphalia	26,163
493	Bad Honnef	North Rhine-Westphalia	26,061
494	Lübbecke	North Rhine-Westphalia	26,027
495	Harsewinkel	North Rhine-Westphalia	25,999
496	Unterhaching	Bavaria	25,873
497	Lindau	Bavaria	25,846
498	Schleswig	Schleswig-Holstein	25,832
499	Kulmbach	Bavaria	25,818
500	Helmstedt	Lower Saxony	25,779
501	Horb am Neckar	Baden-Württemberg	25,752
502	Rinteln	Lower Saxony	25,721
503	Ellwangen	Baden-Württemberg	25,678
504	Friedrichsdorf	Hesse	25,662
505	Geretsried	Bavaria	25,623
506	Sankt Wendel	Saarland	25,583
507	Idstein	Hesse	25,554
508	Vaterstetten	Bavaria	25,530
509	Verl	North Rhine-Westphalia	25,522
510	Rottweil	Baden-Württemberg	25,513
511	Brilon	North Rhine-Westphalia	25,511
512	Sangerhausen	Saxony-Anhalt	25,441
513	Öhringen	Baden-Württemberg	25,388
514	Roth	Bavaria	25,367
515	Lennestadt	North Rhine-Westphalia	25,352
516	Wiehl	North Rhine-Westphalia	25,314
517	Salzkotten	North Rhine-Westphalia	25,311
518	Obertshausen	Hesse	25,307
519	Lüdinghausen	North Rhine-Westphalia	25,259
520	Weingarten	Baden-Württemberg	25,257
521	Delitzsch	Saxony	25,244
522	Pfungstadt	Hesse	25,231
523	Petershagen	North Rhine-Westphalia	25,222
524	Stutensee	Baden-Württemberg	25,204
525	Norden	Lower Saxony	25,179
526	Espelkamp	North Rhine-Westphalia	25,174
527	Ditzingen	Baden-Württemberg	25,145
528	Köthen (Anhalt)	Saxony-Anhalt	25,116
529	Olpe	North Rhine-Westphalia	25,015
530	Plettenberg	North Rhine-Westphalia	24,954
531	Bad Oldesloe	Schleswig-Holstein	24,935
532	Schmallenberg	North Rhine-Westphalia	24,878
533	Meckenheim	North Rhine-Westphalia	24,877
534	Sprockhövel	North Rhine-Westphalia	24,838
535	Syke	Lower Saxony	24,810
536	Markkleeberg	Saxony	24,523
537	Rudolstadt	Thuringia	24,749
538	Meiningen	Thuringia	24,745
539	Warstein	North Rhine-Westphalia	24,647
540	Waldshut-Tiengen	Baden-Württemberg	24,605
541	Rathenow	Brandenburg	24,597
542	Ronnenberg	Lower Saxony	24,570
543	Bad Mergentheim	Baden-Württemberg	24,564
544	Isernhagen	Lower Saxony	24,563
545	Zittau	Saxony	24,794
546	Haren (Ems)	Lower Saxony	24,498
547	Waldkraiburg	Bavaria	24,488
548	Attendorn	North Rhine-Westphalia	24,448
549	Herzogenaurach	Bavaria	24,404
550	Varel	Lower Saxony	24,397
551	Bedburg	North Rhine-Westphalia	24,302
552	Freudenstadt	Baden-Württemberg	24,301
553	Staßfurt	Saxony-Anhalt	24,293
554	Calw	Baden-Württemberg	24,219
555	Übach-Palenberg	North Rhine-Westphalia	24,215
556	Riedstadt	Hesse	24,209
557	Sehnde	Lower Saxony	24,157
558	Eisenhüttenstadt	Brandenburg	24,125
559	Wandlitz	Brandenburg	24,104
560	Moormerland	Lower Saxony	24,055
561	Jüchen	North Rhine-Westphalia	23,940
562	Alfter	North Rhine-Westphalia	23,904
563	Westerstede	Lower Saxony	23,854
564	Limbach-Oberfrohna	Saxony	23,833
565	Döbeln	Saxony	23,763
566	Starnberg	Bavaria	23,741
567	Husum	Schleswig-Holstein	23,735
568	Korbach	Hesse	23,706
569	Gelnhausen	Hesse	23,679
570	Salzwedel	Saxony-Anhalt	23,543
571	Kaltenkirchen	Schleswig-Holstein	23,538
572	Hann. Münden	Lower Saxony	23,530
573	Sonneberg	Thuringia	23,507
574	Mosbach	Baden-Württemberg	23,484
575	Dillenburg	Hesse	23,480
576	Senftenberg	Brandenburg	23,405
577	Netphen	North Rhine-Westphalia	23,363
578	Leutkirch im Allgäu	Baden-Württemberg	23,345
579	Warburg	North Rhine-Westphalia	23,322
580	Quedlinburg	Saxony-Anhalt	23,313
581	Gersthofen	Bavaria	23,274
582	Wertheim am Main	Baden-Württemberg	23,196
583	Rastede	Lower Saxony	23,180
584	Karben	Hesse	23,172
585	Bad Soden am Taunus	Hesse	23,162
586	Vreden	North Rhine-Westphalia	23,161
587	Überlingen	Baden-Württemberg	23,098
588	Apolda	Thuringia	23,072
589	Weilheim in Oberbayern	Bavaria	23,056
590	Bad Kissingen	Bavaria	23,037
591	Bad Salzungen	Thuringia	23,013
592	Wallenhorst	Lower Saxony	22,989
593	Nagold	Baden-Württemberg	22,985
594	Lengerich	North Rhine-Westphalia	22,980
595	Friesoythe	Lower Saxony	22,945
596	Kitzingen	Bavaria	22,945
597	Edewecht	Lower Saxony	22,908
598	Senden	Bavaria	22,896
599	Neusäß	Bavaria	22,872
600	Laupheim	Baden-Württemberg	22,863
601	Herdecke	North Rhine-Westphalia	22,758
602	Burg bei Magdeburg	Saxony-Anhalt	22,689
603	Rotenburg an der Wümme	Lower Saxony	22,656
604	Stadthagen	Lower Saxony	22,643
605	Lutherstadt Eisleben	Saxony-Anhalt	22,639
606	Büdingen	Hesse	22,622
607	Haar	Bavaria	22,555
608	Metzingen	Baden-Württemberg	22,528
609	Neu Wulmstorf	Lower Saxony	22,450
610	Donaueschingen	Baden-Württemberg	22,431
611	Ottobrunn	Bavaria	22,430
612	Bad Rappenau	Baden-Württemberg	22,356
613	Versmold	North Rhine-Westphalia	22,274
614	Eppingen	Baden-Württemberg	22,226
615	Radevormwald	North Rhine-Westphalia	22,222
616	Ilsede	Lower Saxony	22,206
617	Quickborn	Schleswig-Holstein	22,165
618	Waldkirch	Baden-Württemberg	22,127
619	Heide	Schleswig-Holstein	22,114
620	Eschborn	Hesse	22,070
621	Karlsfeld	Bavaria	22,069
622	Schwetzingen	Baden-Württemberg	22,062
623	Gardelegen	Saxony-Anhalt	22,054
624	Elsdorf	North Rhine-Westphalia	22,021
625	Halle (Westf.)	North Rhine-Westphalia	21,970
626	Glauchau	Saxony	21,951
627	Aichach	Bavaria	21,908
628	Sonthofen	Bavaria	21,859
629	Flörsheim am Main	Hesse	21,851
630	Soltau	Lower Saxony	21,808
631	Eislingen	Baden-Württemberg	21,745
632	Hockenheim	Baden-Württemberg	21,745
633	Bad Harzburg	Lower Saxony	21,738
634	Mühldorf am Inn	Bavaria	21,697
635	Geseke	North Rhine-Westphalia	21,685
636	Bad Krozingen	Baden-Württemberg	21,684
637	Westoverledingen	Lower Saxony	21,678
638	Lindlar	North Rhine-Westphalia	21,665
639	Spremberg	Brandenburg	21,585
640	Xanten	North Rhine-Westphalia	21,582
641	Seligenstadt	Hesse	21,568
642	Stadtallendorf	Hesse	21,552
643	Zerbst	Saxony-Anhalt	21,519
644	Eckernförde	Schleswig-Holstein	21,507
645	Günzburg	Bavaria	21,486
646	Büren	North Rhine-Westphalia	21,483
647	Rees	North Rhine-Westphalia	21,475
648	Osterode am Harz	Lower Saxony	21,446
649	Waghäusel	Baden-Württemberg	21,444
650	Zossen	Brandenburg	21,433
651	Puchheim	Bavaria	21,420
652	Sondershausen	Thuringia	21,317
653	Gauting	Bavaria	21,276
654	Waren (Müritz)	Mecklenburg-Vorpommern	21,267
655	Traunstein	Bavaria	21,251
656	Wildeshausen	Lower Saxony	21,154
657	Schramberg	Baden-Württemberg	21,125
658	Wipperfürth	North Rhine-Westphalia	21,112
659	Traunreut	Bavaria	21,102
660	Wülfrath	North Rhine-Westphalia	21,100
661	Germersheim	Rhineland-Palatinate	21,099
662	Groß-Umstadt	Hesse	21,028
663	Zülpich	North Rhine-Westphalia	21,025
664	Nördlingen	Bavaria	21,009
665	Mössingen	Baden-Württemberg	20,900
666	Senden	North Rhine-Westphalia	20,895
667	Herborn	Hesse	20,894
668	Panketal	Brandenburg	20,854
669	Luckenwalde	Brandenburg	20,839
670	Bruchköbel	Hesse	20,825
671	Meinerzhagen	North Rhine-Westphalia	20,812
672	Stadtlohn	North Rhine-Westphalia	20,807
673	Schortens	Lower Saxony	20,797
674	Wittmund	Lower Saxony	20,773
675	Hörstel	North Rhine-Westphalia	20,766
676	Enger	North Rhine-Westphalia	20,705
677	Werdau	Saxony	20,702
678	Nidderau	Hesse	20,700
679	Steinhagen	North Rhine-Westphalia	20,671
680	Schwanewede	Lower Saxony	20,661
681	Rheinstetten	Baden-Württemberg	20,659
682	Bad Waldsee	Baden-Württemberg	20,630
683	Schifferstadt	Rhineland-Palatinate	20,615
684	Dingolfing	Bavaria	20,607
685	Neufahrn bei Freising	Bavaria	20,590
686	Wachtberg	North Rhine-Westphalia	20,581
687	Fröndenberg	North Rhine-Westphalia	20,548
688	Coswig (Sachsen)	Saxony	20,512
689	Burgwedel	Lower Saxony	20,506
690	Uetze	Lower Saxony	20,471
691	Greiz	Thuringia	20,397
692	Haßloch	Rhineland-Palatinate	20,387
693	Reichenbach im Vogtland	Saxony	20,371
694	Kleinmachnow	Brandenburg	20,341
695	Neustrelitz	Mecklenburg-Vorpommern	20,340
696	Lilienthal	Lower Saxony	20,293
697	Duderstadt	Lower Saxony	20,286
698	Bad Schwartau	Schleswig-Holstein	20,255
699	Blieskastel	Saarland	20,240
700	Ochtrup	North Rhine-Westphalia	20,230
701	Telgte	North Rhine-Westphalia	20,222
702	Lichtenfels (Bayern)	Bavaria	20,217
703	Schopfheim	Baden-Württemberg	20,163
704	Giengen an der Brenz	Baden-Württemberg	20,133
705	Kürten	North Rhine-Westphalia	20,128
706	Holzminden	Lower Saxony	20,120
707	Leinefelde-Worbis	Thuringia	20,119
708	Neunkirchen-Seelscheid	North Rhine-Westphalia	20,109
709	Oberkirch	Baden-Württemberg	20,092
710	Schmalkalden	Thuringia	20,065
711	Tettnang	Baden-Württemberg	20,037

== See also ==
- List of cities in Germany by population
