= 1792 in architecture =

The year 1792 in architecture involved some significant events.

== Buildings and structures ==
=== Buildings ===
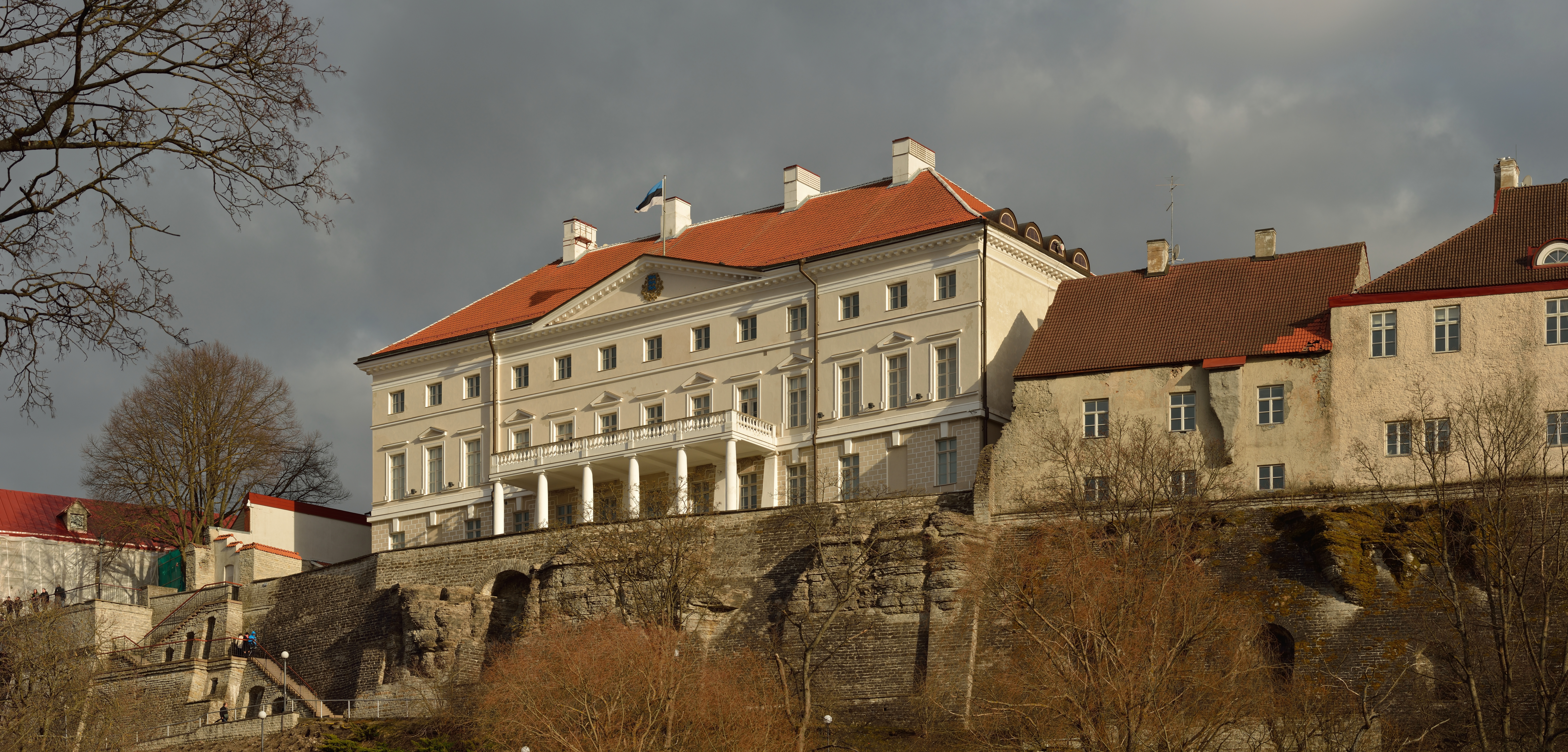
Stenbock House, Tallinn

- May 16 – La Fenice theatre in Venice, designed by Gianantonio Selva, is inaugurated with an opera performance.
- August 22–31 – Columbus Obelisk in Baltimore, Maryland.
- October 13 – Work begins on the White House, designed by James Hoban, in Washington, D.C.
- Alexander Palace in Tsarskoye Selo, Russia is built.
- Church of St John-at-Hackney in London, designed by James Spiller, is built.
- Stenbock House in Tallinn, designed by Johann Caspar Mohr, is completed.
- The Old State House (Connecticut) in Hartford is probably designed by Charles Bulfinch (his first commission for a public building).
- Manjarabad fort in India is built.
- Sir John Soane begins work on his house in London, which becomes the Soane Museum.

== Awards ==
- Grand Prix de Rome, architecture: Pierre-Charles-Joseph Normand.

== Births ==
- June 15 – Philip Hardwick, English architect (died 1870)
- August 20 – Jakob Ignaz Hittorff, Franco-German architect who supervises changes at the Palais Beauharnais in Paris (died 1867)
- October 28 – Luigi Poletti, Italian neoclassical architect (died 1869)
- Thomas Deane, Irish architect (died 1871)

== Deaths ==
- March 3 – Robert Adam, Scottish-born neoclassical architect and interior and furniture designer (born 1728)
- October 28 – John Smeaton, English civil engineer (born 1724)
