= Municipalities of Germany =

Lowest level of official territorial division in Germany

Municipalities of Germany Deutsche Gemeinden (German)
- Category: Municipality
- Location: Germany
- Found in: District (Kreis); Regierungsbezirk
- Populations: 11 (Gröde) - 3,600,000 (Berlin)

Administrative divisions of Germany (clickable image)

Municipalities (German: Gemeinden, pronounced [ɡəˌmaɪ̯ndn̩]; singular Gemeinde [ɡəˈmaɪ̯ndə]) are the lowest level of official territorial division in Germany. Article 28, paragraph 2 of the German constitution provides for the right of Gemeinden to freely govern the affairs of their local community. This principle, known as kommunale Selbstverwaltung, places a high degree of autonomy and responsibility on German Gemeinden.

The Gemeinde level can be the second, third, fourth or fifth level of territorial division, depending on the status of the municipality and the Land (federal state) it is part of. The city-states Berlin, Bremen and Hamburg are second-level divisions. A Gemeinde is one level lower in those states which also include Regierungsbezirke (singular: Regierungsbezirk) as an intermediate territorial division (Baden-Württemberg, Bavaria, Hesse and North Rhine-Westphalia). The Gemeinde is one level higher if it is not part of a Gemeindeverband ("municipal association").

The highest degree of autonomy may be found in the Gemeinden which are not part of a Kreis ("district"). These Gemeinden are referred to as Kreisfreie Städte or Stadtkreise, often translated as "urban district". In some states, bigger Gemeinden that do form part of a Kreis retain a higher measure of autonomy than the other municipalities of the Kreis (e.g. Große Kreisstadt). Municipalities titled Stadt (town or city) are urban municipalities while those titled Gemeinde are classified as rural municipalities.

With more than 3,600,000 inhabitants, the most populous municipality of Germany is the city of Berlin; and the least populous is Gröde in Schleswig-Holstein.

== Municipalities per federal state ==
Status as of January 2024.

Federal state	Municipalities	Municipalities with town status	Municipalities that are urban districts	Average no. of inhabitants	Average area (km^{2})	Lists (Cities, Towns, Municipalities)
Baden-Württemberg	1,101	313	9	10,012	32.5	C, T, M
Bavaria	2,056	317	25	6,321	34.3	C, T, M
Berlin	1	1	1	3,613,000	891.0	Berlin
Brandenburg	413	113	4	6,005	71.1	C, T, M
Bremen	2	2	2	340,500	209.5	Bremen, Bremerhaven
Hamburg	1	1	1	1,831,000	755.2	Hamburg
Hesse	422	191	5	14,759	49.9	C, T, M
Lower Saxony	939	159	8	8,426	50.5	C, T, M
Mecklenburg-Vorpommern	725	84	2	2,148	31.1	C, T, M
North Rhine-Westphalia	396	271	22	45,232	86.1	C, T, M
Rhineland-Palatinate	2,301	129	12	1,768	8.6	C, T, M
Saarland	52	17	0	19,115	49.4	C, T, M
Saxony	418	169	3	9,694	43.8	C, T, M
Saxony-Anhalt	218	104	3	10,197	93.8	C, T, M
Schleswig-Holstein	1,104	63	4	2,613	14.3	C, T, M
Thuringia	605	117	5	3,515	26.7	C, T, M
Germany	10,753	2,056	106	7,517	32.5	C, T, M

== Municipal reforms ==
The number of municipalities of Germany has decreased strongly over the years: in 1968 there were 24,282 municipalities in West Germany, and in 1980 there were 8,409. The same trend occurred in the New states of Germany after the German reunification: from 7,612 municipalities in 1990 to 2,380 as of 1 January 2024. While in some cases growing cities absorbed neighbouring municipalities, most of these mergers were driven by a need to increase the efficiency and reduce costs of administration. At the same time, many districts and also urban districts were merged into larger districts.

== Types of municipalities ==
There are several types of municipalities in Germany, with different levels of autonomy. Each federal state has its own administrative laws, and its own local government structure. The main types of municipalities are:

- city state (German: Stadtstaat): Berlin, Bremen and Hamburg are both municipalities and federal states
- urban district (Kreisfreie Stadt, in Baden-Württemberg: Stadtkreis): a municipality that is not part of a district, and hence fulfills the responsibilities of both a municipality and a district. As of 2018, there are 107 urban districts (including Berlin and Hamburg)
- major district town (varies by state, mainly Große Kreisstadt): a municipality that is part of a district and has town privileges, but due to its size also fulfills the responsibilities usually fulfilled by a district. As of 2025, there are a total of 462 municipalities with special status.
- town (Stadt): a municipality with the right to call itself "Stadt". The title "Stadt" does not imply any duties or rights anymore. Many towns received town privileges in the Middle Ages, others were elevated to town status more recently because they reached a certain size, e.g. more than 10,000 inhabitants
- market town (Markt): a type of municipality unique to Bavaria, can be part of a municipal association or not, is considered to be between municipality (Gemeinde) and town (Stadt). In the Middle Ages the title was given to municipalities with the right to hold markets (Marktrecht). Today usually implies that the municipality holds a central location/status in providing services to local communities. As of 2025, there are 386 Markts in Bavaria.
- municipality forming part of a municipal association (Amtsangehörige Gemeinde, Verwaltungsgemeinschaftsangehörige Gemeinde, Mitgliedsgemeinde or Ortsgemeinde in Rhineland-Palatinate): a municipality with a mayor and a municipal council, but no other administrative institutions. Administrative duties are performed by the Gemeindeverband ("municipal association")
- municipality not forming part of a municipal association: an Amtsfreie Gemeinde (independent municipality), an Einheitsgemeinde (unified municipality) or, in Rhineland-Palatinate, a Verbandsfreie Gemeinde (association-free municipality) - a municipality that fulfills all responsibilities of a municipality

== Local elections ==
In all municipalities, the mayor and the members of the municipal council are appointed by local elections that take place on a regular basis. Elections for the municipal councils (Kommunalwahlen) take place every 4 years in Bremen, every 6 years in Bavaria and every 5 years in all other states.

The office of mayor is full-time (hauptamtlich) in larger municipalities, and voluntary (ehrenamtlich) in smaller municipalities, for instance those that are part of a municipal association. Mayors are elected for a specific term, which is different in every state. Since mayoral elections also have to be held when a mayor resigns from office, these do not take place at the same time for all municipalities in a state. The terms for mayors are:

- Baden-Württemberg: 8 years
- Bavaria, Hesse, Thuringia: 6 years
- Berlin, Hamburg: 5 years, indirect elections
- Brandenburg, Rhineland-Palatinate: 8 years for full-time mayors, 5 years for voluntary mayors
- Bremen: 4-6 years, indirect elections
- Lower Saxony, North Rhine-Westphalia: 5 years
- Mecklenburg-Vorpommern: 7-9 years for full-time mayors, 5 years for voluntary mayors
- Saarland: 10 years
- Saxony, Saxony-Anhalt: 7 years
- Schleswig-Holstein: 6-8 years for full-time mayors, 5 years for voluntary mayors

== See also ==
- List of municipalities in Germany
