= List of towns and cities in Germany by historical population =

The list of the largest German cities provides an overview of the most populous cities that were located in contemporary German territory at the time of the individual statistics.

Industrialization in the 19th century, especially since the Gründerzeit and the foundation of the German Empire in 1871, brought with it increased urbanization in Germany, leading to a largely urbanized society.

The following tables show historical population figures of German cities according to the respective area status. Also listed is the superordinate administrative unit (state, country, kingdom, province, district) to which the city belonged in the corresponding year. The following historical and current German state entities were taken into account:

- Holy Roman Empire (962–1806)
- German Confederation (1815–1866)
- German Reich (1871–1949)
- German Democratic Republic (1949–1990)
- Federal Republic of Germany (1949–present)

Current information can be found in the list of cities in Germany by population.

== Antiquity ==
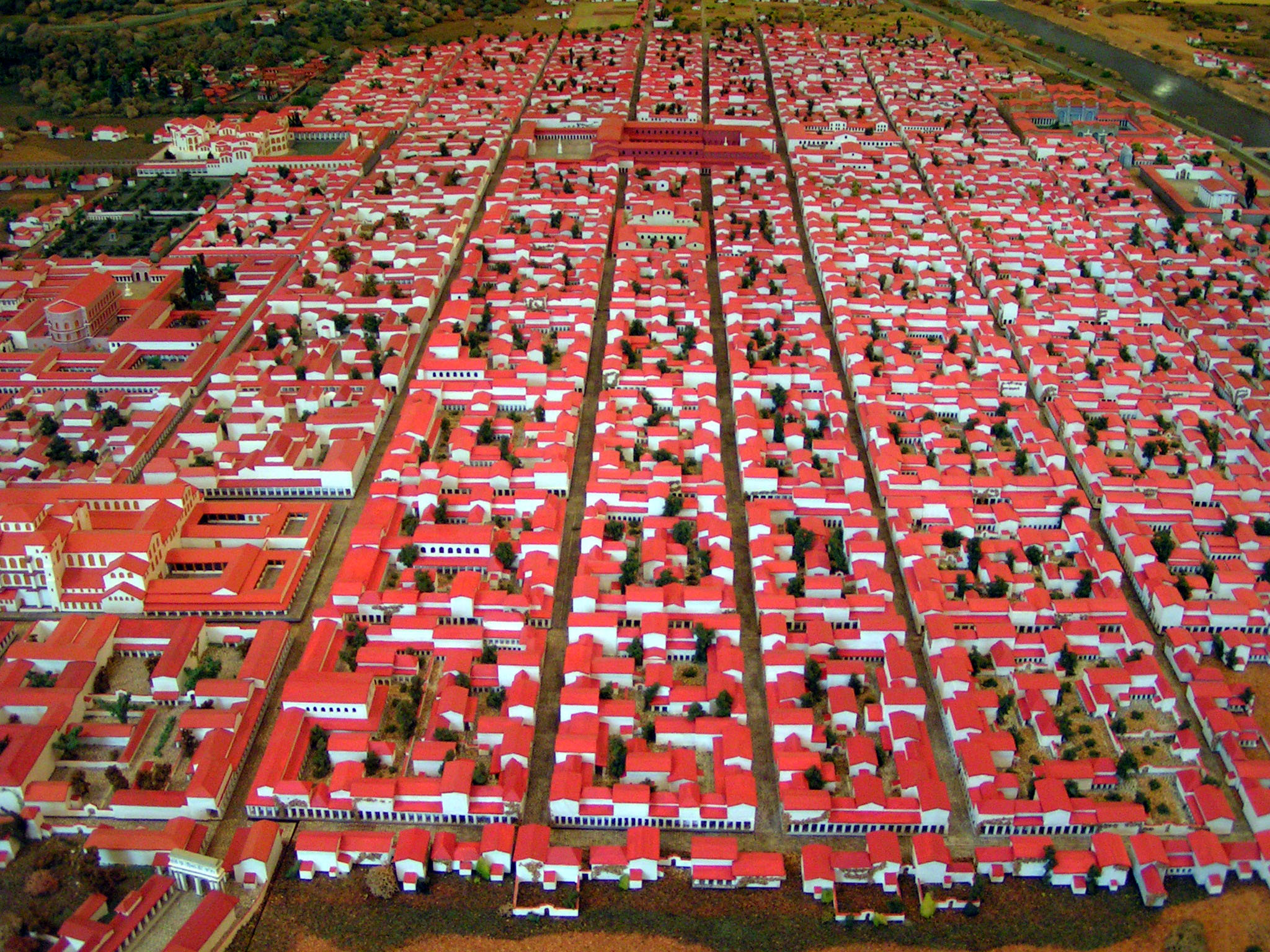
Model of Trier in the 4th century

Ancient Rome developed from 200 B.C. and spread from Italy to northern Italy, northern Africa (Tunisia) and central Europe in the following period. The heyday of the ancient Romans can be seen in the 1st to 3rd century A.D., many ancient ruins date from this period.

Roman cities in Germany were mainly built along the Rhine and Danube:

- Augsburg
- Bonn
- Koblenz
- Cologne
- Mainz
- Neuss
- Nida
- Passau
- Regensburg
- Straubing
- Trier, already in the 3rd and 4th century the largest city north of the Alps with an estimated 80,000 inhabitants
- Xanten

== Middle Ages to modern times ==
With the migration of peoples in the 5th century, the ancient cities on the territory of present-day Germany were largely decayed. Only Augsburg, Regensburg, Trier and Cologne have been preserved as cities. The number of cities in Central Europe remained very small until about 1100 with a few hundred. By far the largest number of new cities was created in the following 250 years, when numerous cities were founded from 1120 onwards, mostly by an act of foundation and town planning. Around the beginning of the modern era, at the beginning of the 16th century, the free and imperial cities as well as the residence cities were the most important cities (among others, today mainly Dutch, French and Belgian cities):

- Cologne and Prague with over 40,000 inhabitants,
- Augsburg, Lübeck, Magdeburg and Nuremberg with about 20,000 to 30,000 inhabitants,
- Aachen, Basel, Braunschweig, Bremen, Breslau, Erfurt, Geneva, Hamburg, Lüneburg, Metz, Trier, Ulm and Vienna, with about 10,000–20,000 inhabitants.

== 1500 ==
The population figures are estimates.

Rank	City	Population	State
1	Prague	70,000	Bohemia
2	Cologne	45,000	Cologne
3	Nuremberg	38,000	Nuremberg
4	Augsburg	30,000	Augsburg
5	Lübeck	25,000	Lübeck
5	Breslau	25,000	Silesia
7	Regensburg	22,000	Regensburg
8	Vienna	20,000	Austria
8	Strasbourg	20,000	Strasbourg

== 1700 ==
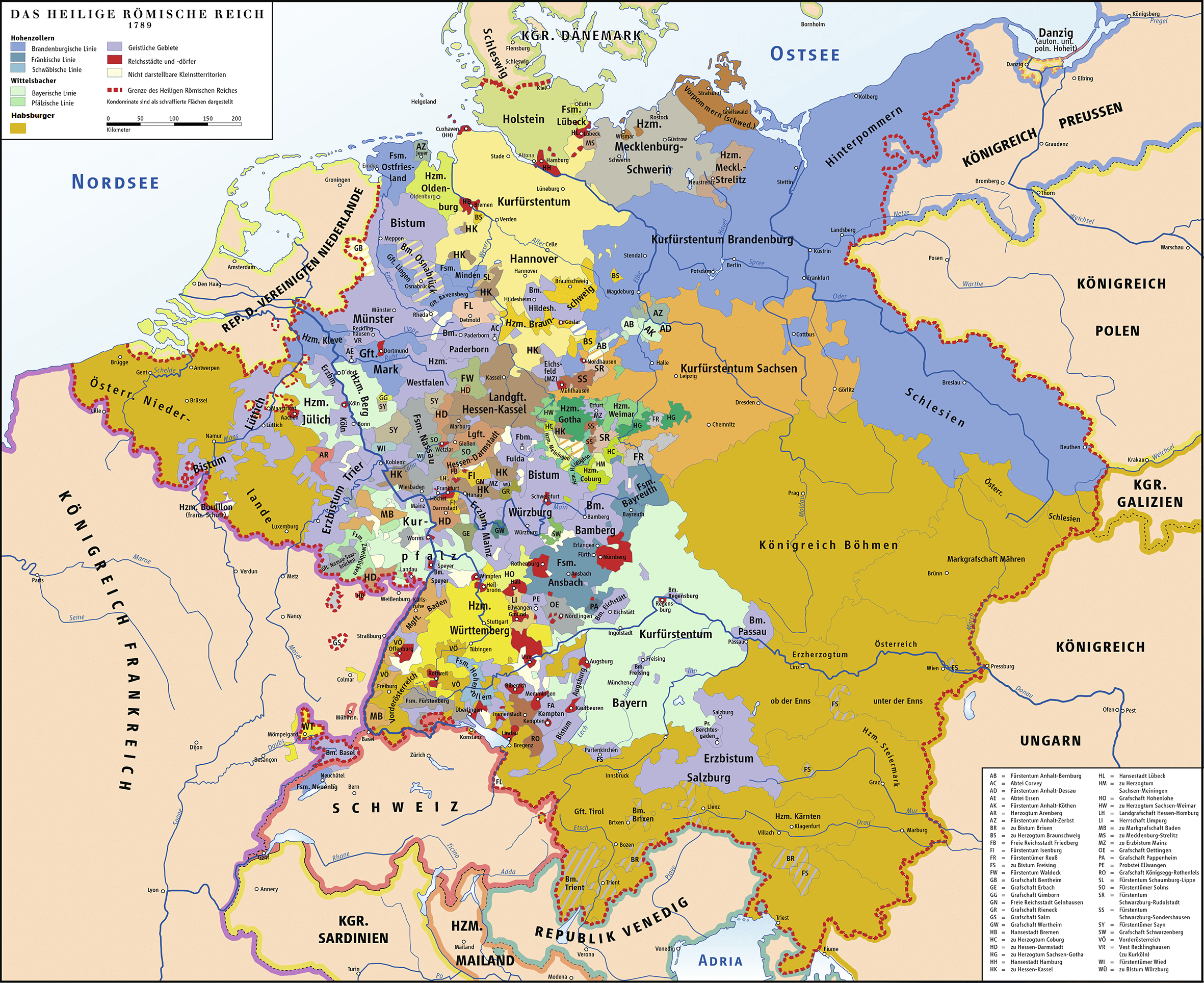
Holy Roman Empire 1789

The population figures are estimates.

Rank	City	Population	State
1	Vienna	114,000	Austria
2	Hamburg	70,000	Hamburg
3	Antwerp	66,000	Brabant
4	Brussels	65,000	Brabant
5	Ghent	52,000	Flanders
6	Liège	45,000	Liège
7	Breslau	40,000	Silesia
8	Cologne	39,000	Cologne
8	Prague	39,000	Bohemia
10	Bruges	36,000	Flanders
11	Nuremberg	35,000	Nuremberg
12	Berlin	30,000	Brandenburg
13	Frankfurt am Main	28,000	Frankfurt am Main
14	Bremen	27,000	Bremen
15	Augsburg	26,000	Augsburg
16	Munich	24,000	Bavaria
17	Lübeck	23,000	Lübeck
18	Dresden	22,000	Saxony
19	Mainz	20,000	Mainz
19	Regensburg	20,000	Regensburg

== 1750 ==
The population figures are estimates.

Rank	City	Population	State
1	Vienna	175,000	Austria
2	Berlin	113,000	Prussia
3	Hamburg	75,000	Hamburg
4	Prague	59,000	Bohemia
5	Brussels	57,000	Austrian Netherlands
5	Liège	57,000	Lüttich
7	Breslau	55,000	Prussia
8	Dresden	52,000	Saxony
9	Antwerp	43,000	Austrian Netherlands
9	Cologne	43,000	Cologne
11	Gent	39,000	Austrian Netherlands
12	Leipzig	35,000	Saxony
13	Frankfurt am Main	32,000	Frankfurt am Main
13	Munich	32,000	Bavaria
13	Augsburg	32,000	Augsburg
16	Bruges	30,000	Austrian Netherlands
16	Nuremberg	30,000	Nuremberg
18	Bremen	28,000	Bremen
19	Braunschweig	25,000	Braunschweig-Lüneburg
20	Mainz	24,000	Mainz

== 1800 ==
The population figures are estimates.

Rank	City	Population	State
1	Vienna	231,000	Austria
2	Berlin	172,000	Prussia
3	Hamburg	130,000	Hamburg
4	Prague	75,000	Bohemia
5	Dresden	61,000	Saxony
6	Königsberg	60,000	Prussia
7	Breslau	54,000	Prussia
8	Cologne	41,000	Cologne
9	Danzig	40,000	Prussia
9	Munich	40,000	Bavaria
11	Bremen	36,000	Bremen
12	Frankfurt am Main	35,000	Frankfurt am Main
13	Augsburg	32,000	Augsburg
13	Leipzig	32,000	Saxony
15	Braunschweig	31,000	Braunschweig-Lüneburg
15	Graz	31,000	Austria
17	Nuremberg	25,000	Nuremberg
18	Aachen	24,000	Aachen
18	Lübeck	24,000	Lübeck
20	Altona	23,000	Holstein

== 1849 ==
German Confederation 1815–1866

The population and area status refer to the census of 3 December 1849.

Rank	City	Population	State
1	Vienna	426,415	Austria
2	Berlin	423,902	Prussia
3	Hamburg	157,450	Hamburg
4	Prague	124,181	Austria
5	Breslau	110,702	Prussia
6	Munich	96,396	Bavaria
7	Cologne	94,789	Prussia
8	Dresden	94,092	Saxony
9	Königsberg	75,240	Prussia
10	Graz	65,788	Austria
11	Triest	63,931	Austria
12	Danzig	63,910	Prussia
13	Leipzig	62,374	Saxony
14	Frankfurt am Main	59,316	Frankfurt am Main
15	Magdeburg	56,181	Prussia
16	Bremen	53,478	Bremen
17	Nuremberg	50,828	Bavaria
18	Aachen	50,533	Prussia
19	Brno	49,460	Austria
20	Stuttgart	47,837	Württemberg

== 1880 ==
German Empire 1871–1918

The population and area status refer to the census of 1 December 1880.

Rank	City	Population	State
1	Berlin	1,122,330	Prussia
2	Hamburg	289,859	Hamburg
3	Breslau	272,912	Prussia
4	Munich	230,023	Bavaria
5	Dresden	220,818	Saxony
6	Leipzig	149,081	Saxony
7	Cologne	144,772	Prussia
8	Königsberg	140,909	Prussia
9	Frankfurt am Main	136,819	Prussia
10	Hanover	122,843	Prussia
11	Stuttgart	117,303	Württemberg
12	Bremen	112,453	Bremen
13	Danzig	108,551	Prussia
14	Strasbourg	104,471	Elsaß-Lothringen
15	Nuremberg	99,519	Bavaria
16	Magdeburg	97,539	Prussia
17	Barmen	95,941	Prussia
18	Düsseldorf	95,458	Prussia
19	Chemnitz	95,123	Saxony
20	Elberfeld	93,538	Prussia

== 1910 ==
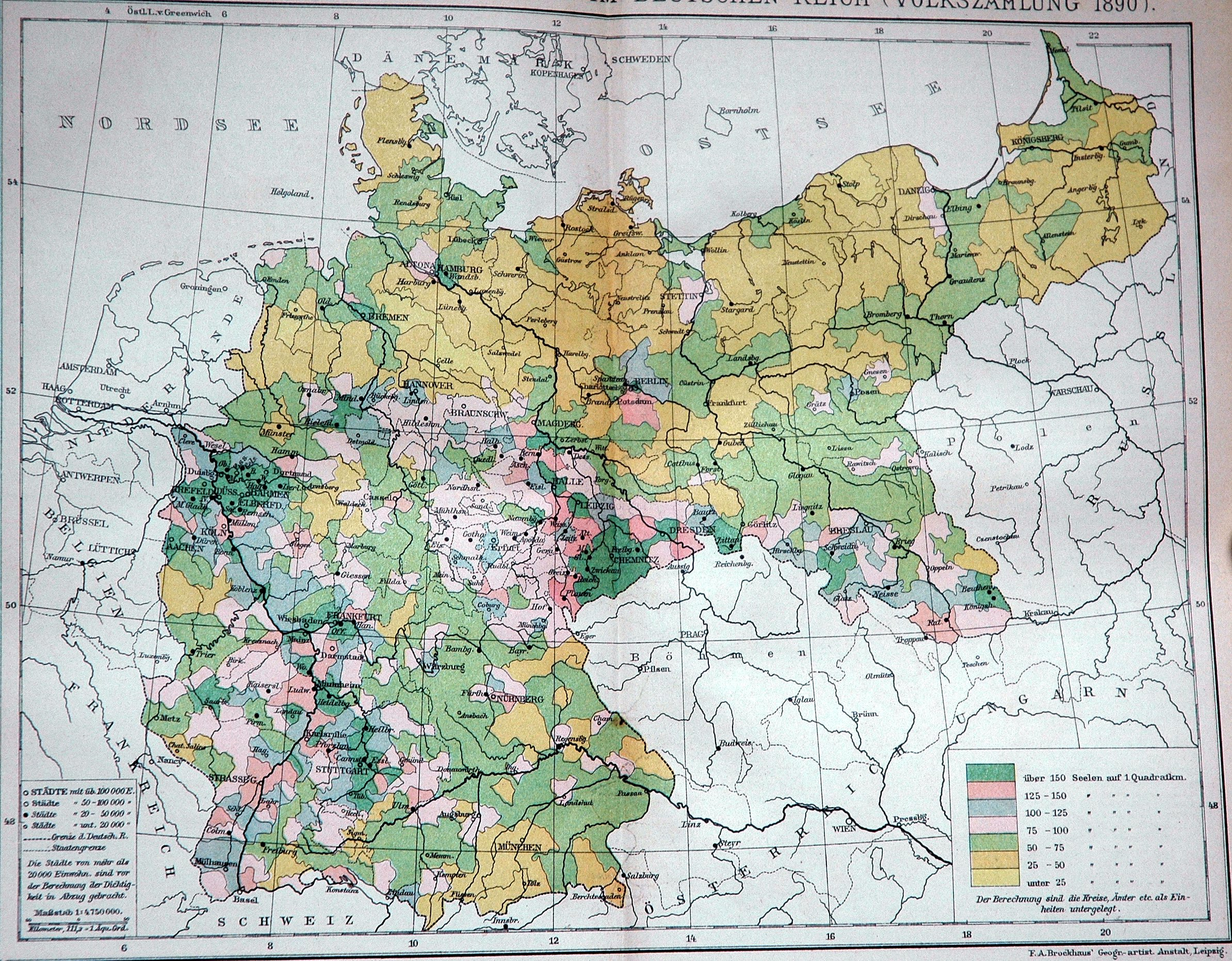
Population density of the German Empire

The population and area status refer to the census of 1 December 1910.

Rank	City	Population	State
1	Berlin	2,071,257	Prussia
2	Hamburg	931,035	Hamburg
3	Munich	596,467	Bavaria
4	Leipzig	589,850	Saxony
5	Dresden	548,308	Saxony
6	Cologne	516,527	Prussia
7	Breslau	512,105	Prussia
8	Frankfurt am Main	414,576	Prussia
9	Düsseldorf	358,728	Prussia
10	Nuremberg	333,142	Bavaria
11	Charlottenburg	305,978	Prussia
12	Hanover	302,375	Prussia
13	Essen	294,653	Prussia
14	Chemnitz	287,807	Saxony
15	Stuttgart	286,218	Württemberg
16	Magdeburg	279,629	Prussia
17	Bremen	247,437	Bremen
18	Königsberg	245,994	Prussia
19	Rixdorf	237,289	Prussia
20	Stettin	236,113	Prussia

== 1919 ==
Weimar Republic 1917–1937

The population and area status refer to the census of 8 October 1919.

Rank	City	Population	State
1	Berlin	1,902,509	Prussia
2	Hamburg	985,779	Hamburg
3	Cologne	633,904	Prussia
4	Munich	630,711	Bavaria
5	Leipzig	604,380	Saxony
6	Dresden	529,326	Saxony
7	Breslau	528,260	Prussia
8	Essen	439,257	Prussia
9	Frankfurt am Main	433,002	Prussia
10	Düsseldorf	407,338	Prussia
11	Nuremberg	352,675	Bavaria
12	Charlottenburg	322,766	Prussia
13	Hanover	310,431	Prussia
14	Stuttgart	309,197	Württemberg
15	Chemnitz	303,775	Saxony
16	Dortmund	295,026	Prussia
17	Magdeburg	285.856	Prussia
18	Neukölln	262,127	Prussia
19	Königsberg	260,895	Prussia
20	Bremen	257,923	Bremen

== 1939 ==
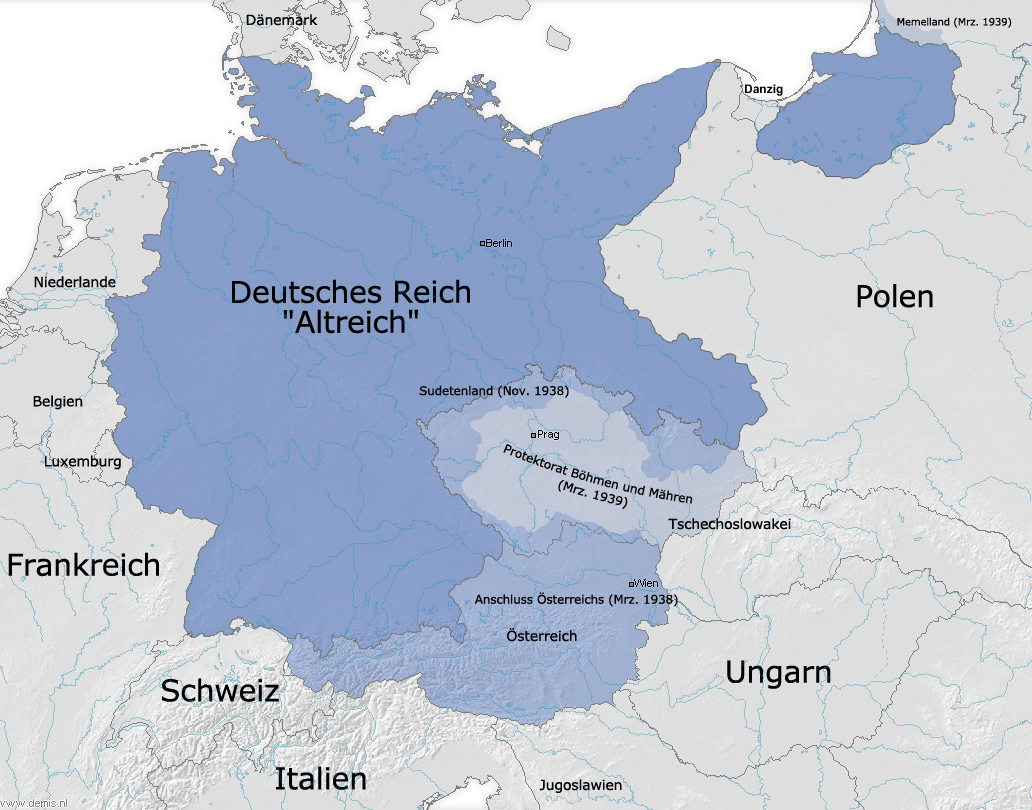
German Empire 1939

The population and area status refer to the census of 17 May 1939.

Rank	City	Population	State
1	Greater Berlin	4,338,756	Prussia
2	Vienna	1,929,976	Ostmark
3	Hamburg	1,711,877	Hamburg
4	Munich	829,318	Bavaria
5	Cologne	772,221	Prussia
6	Leipzig	707,365	Saxony
7	Essen	666,743	Prussia
8	Dresden	630,216	Saxony
9	Breslau	629,565	Prussia
10	Frankfurt am Main	553,464	Prussia
11	Dortmund	542,261	Prussia
12	Düsseldorf	541,410	Prussia
13	Hanover	470,950	Prussia
14	Stuttgart	458,429	Württemberg
15	Duisburg	434,646	Prussia
16	Nuremberg	423,383	Bavaria
17	Wuppertal	401,672	Prussia
18	Stettin	383,000	Prussia
19	Königsberg	372,164	Prussia
20	Bremen	354,109	Bremen

== 1946 ==
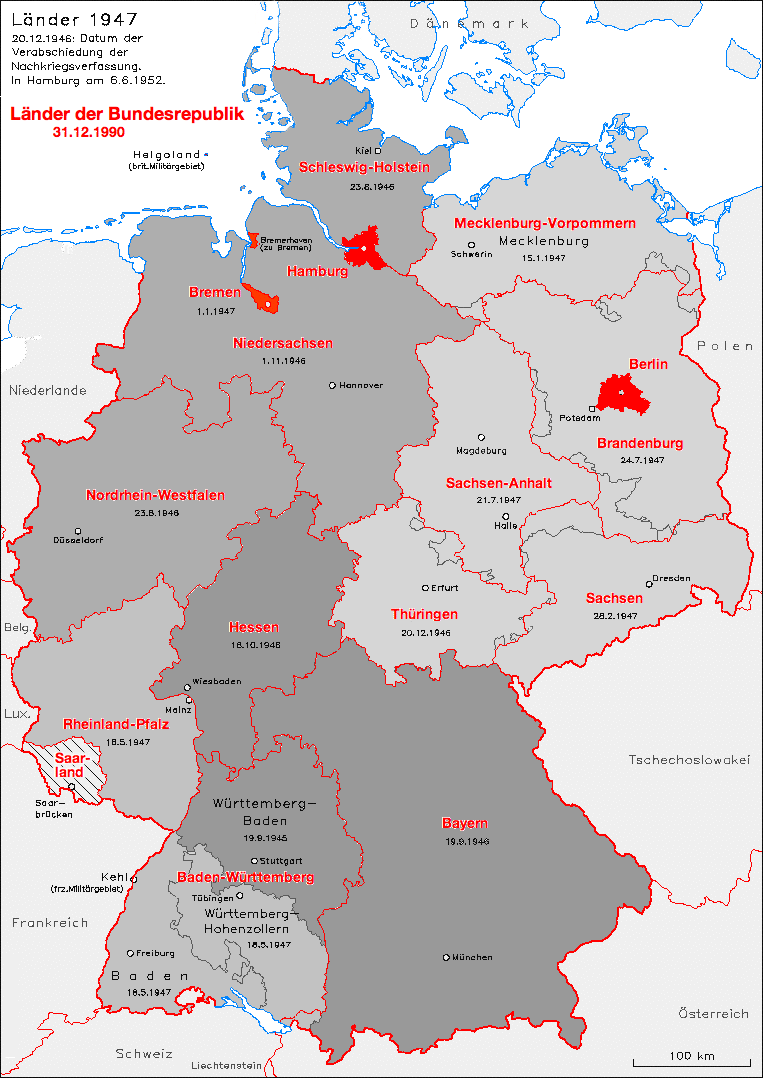
The states of Germany 1947–1952 compared to the borders 1990–1992

The population and area status refer to the census of 29 October 1946.

Rank	City	Population	State
1	Berlin	3,187,470	Berlin
2	Hamburg	1,403,300	Hamburg
3	Munich	751,967	Bavaria
4	Leipzig	607,655	Saxony
5	Essen	524,728	North Rhine-Westphalia
6	Cologne	491,380	North Rhine-Westphalia
7	Dresden	467,966	Saxony
8	Dortmund	436,491	North Rhine-Westphalia
9	Frankfurt am Main	424,065	Hesse
10	Düsseldorf	420,909	North Rhine-Westphalia
11	Stuttgart	413,528	Württemberg-Baden
12	Bremen	385,266	Bremen
13	Duisburg	356,408	North Rhine-Westphalia
14	Hanover	354,955	Hanover
15	Wuppertal	325,846	North Rhine-Westphalia
16	Nuremberg	312,338	Bavaria
17	Gelsenkirchen	265,793	North Rhine-Westphalia
18	Chemnitz	250,188	Saxony
19	Bochum	246,477	North Rhine-Westphalia
20	Magdeburg	236,326	Saxony-Anhalt

== 1975 ==
The population figures for the year 1975 are estimates.

Rank	City	Population	State/District
1	Berlin^{1}	3,083,011	Berlin
2	Hamburg	1,717,383	Hamburg
3	Munich	1,314,865	Bavaria
4	Cologne	1,013,771	North Rhine-Westphalia
5	Essen	677,568	North Rhine-Westphalia
6	Düsseldorf	664,336	North Rhine-Westphalia
7	Frankfurt am Main	636,157	Hesse
8	Dortmund	630,609	North Rhine-Westphalia
9	Stuttgart	600,421	Baden-Württemberg
10	Duisburg	591,635	North Rhine-Westphalia
11	Bremen	572,969	Bremen
12	Leipzig	566,630	Leipzig
13	Hannover	552,955	Lower Saxony
14	Dresden	509,331	Dresden
15	Nuremberg	499,060	Bavaria
16	Bochum	414,842	North Rhine-Westphalia
17	Wuppertal	405,369	North Rhine-Westphalia
18	Gelsenkirchen	322,584	North Rhine-Westphalia
19	Bielefeld	316,058	North Rhine-Westphalia
20	Mannheim	314,086	Baden-Württemberg

^{1}: East Berlin (1,098,174) and West Berlin (1,984,837)

== 2000 ==
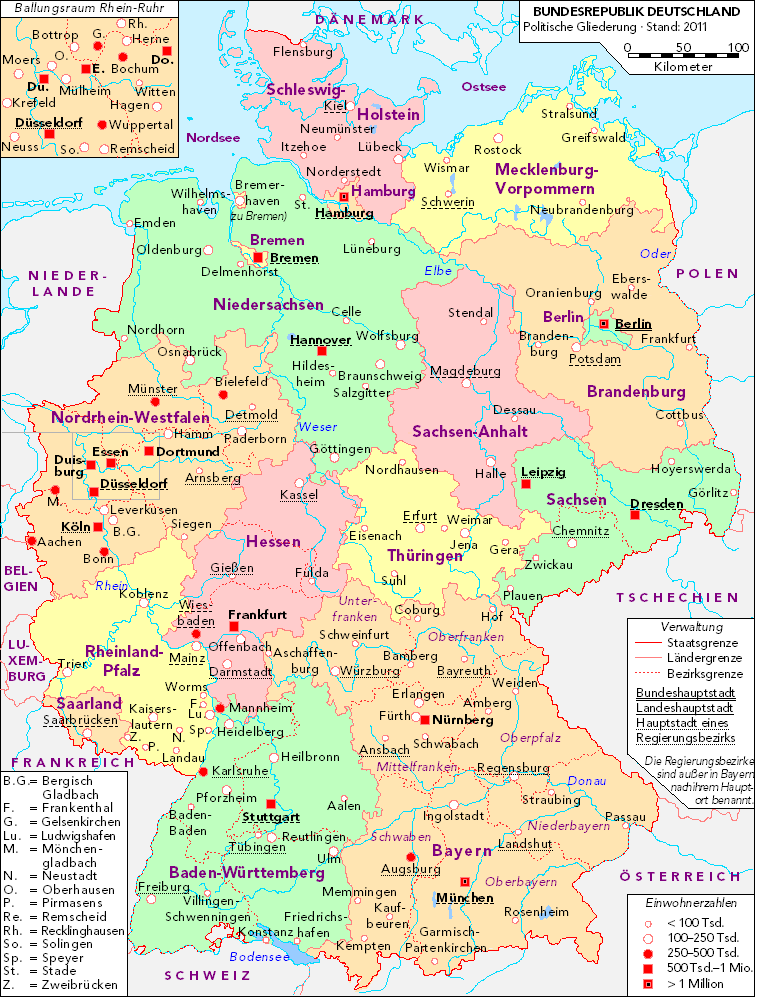
Germany since 1993

The population figures for the year 2000 are estimates.

Rank	City	Population	State
1	Berlin	3,382,169	Berlin
2	Hamburg	1,715,392	Hamburg
3	Munich	1,210,223	Bavaria
4	Cologne	962,884	North Rhine-Westphalia
5	Frankfurt am Main	646,550	Hesse
6	Essen	595.243	North Rhine-Westphalia
7	Dortmund	588,994	North Rhine-Westphalia
8	Stuttgart	583,874	Baden-Württemberg
9	Düsseldorf	569,364	North Rhine-Westphalia
10	Bremen	539,403	Bremen
11	Hanover	515,001	Lower Saxony
12	Duisburg	514,915	North Rhine-Westphalia
13	Leipzig	493,208	Saxony
14	Nuremberg	488,400	Bavaria
15	Dresden	477,807	Saxony
16	Bochum	391,147	North Rhine-Westphalia
17	Wuppertal	366,434	North Rhine-Westphalia
18	Bielefeld	321,758	North Rhine-Westphalia
19	Mannheim	306,729	Baden-Württemberg
20	Bonn	302,247	North Rhine-Westphalia

== 2015 ==
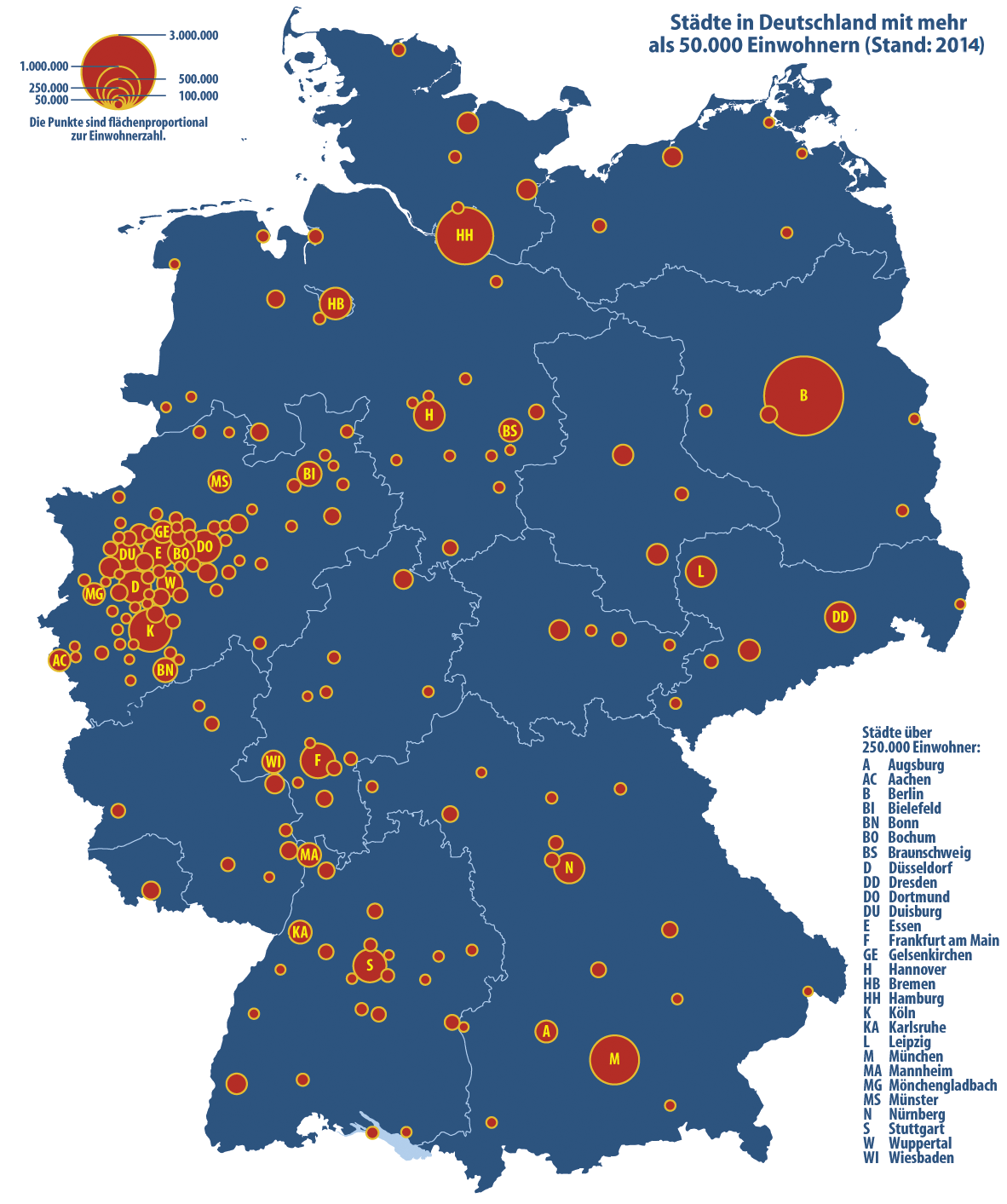
Map of cities in Germany with more than 50,000 inhabitants 2014

The population figures for the year 2015 are estimates.

Rank	City	Population	State
1	Berlin	3,520,031	Berlin
2	Hamburg	1,787,408	Hamburg
3	Munich	1,450,381	Bavaria
4	Cologne	1,060,582	North Rhine-Westphalia
5	Frankfurt am Main	732,688	Hesse
6	Stuttgart	623,738	Baden-Württemberg
7	Düsseldorf	612,178	North Rhine-Westphalia
8	Dortmund	586,181	North Rhine-Westphalia
9	Essen	582,624	North Rhine-Westphalia
10	Leipzig	560,472	Saxony
11	Bremen	557,464	Bremen
12	Dresden	543,825	Saxony
13	Hanover	532,163	Lower Saxony
14	Nuremberg	509,975	Bavaria
15	Duisburg	491,231	North Rhine-Westphalia
16	Bochum	364,742	North Rhine-Westphalia
17	Wuppertal	350,046	North Rhine-Westphalia
18	Bielefeld	333,090	North Rhine-Westphalia
19	Bonn	318,809	North Rhine-Westphalia
20	Münster	310,039	North Rhine-Westphalia

== 2020 ==
The population figures for the year 2020 are estimates.

Rank	City	Population	State
1	Berlin	3,664,088	Berlin
2	Hamburg	1,852,478	Hamburg
3	Munich	1,488,202	Bavaria
4	Cologne	1,083,498	North Rhine-Westphalia
5	Frankfurt am Main	764,104	Hesse
6	Stuttgart	630,305	Baden-Württemberg
7	Düsseldorf	620,523	North Rhine-Westphalia
8	Leipzig	597,493	Saxony
9	Dortmund	587,696	North Rhine-Westphalia
10	Essen	582,415	North Rhine-Westphalia
11	Bremen	566,573	Bremen
12	Dresden	556,227	Saxony
13	Hanover	534,049	Lower Saxony
14	Nuremberg	515,543	Bavaria
15	Duisburg	495,885	North Rhine-Westphalia
16	Bochum	364,454	North Rhine-Westphalia
17	Wuppertal	355,004	North Rhine-Westphalia
18	Bielefeld	333,509	North Rhine-Westphalia
19	Bonn	330,579	North Rhine-Westphalia
20	Münster	316,403	North Rhine-Westphalia

== 2022 ==
The population figures for the year 2022 are estimates.

Rank	City	Population	State
1	Berlin	3,755,251	Berlin
2	Hamburg	1,892,122	Hamburg
3	Munich	1,512,491	Bavaria
4	Cologne	1,084,831	North Rhine-Westphalia
5	Frankfurt am Main	773,068	Hesse
6	Stuttgart	632,865	Baden-Württemberg
7	Düsseldorf	629,047	North Rhine-Westphalia
8	Leipzig	616,093	Saxony
9	Dortmund	593,317	North Rhine-Westphalia
10	Essen	584,580	North Rhine-Westphalia
11	Bremen	569,396	Bremen
12	Dresden	563,311	Saxony
13	Hanover	545,045	Lower Saxony
14	Nuremberg	523,026	Bavaria
15	Duisburg	502,211	North Rhine-Westphalia
16	Bochum	365,742	North Rhine-Westphalia
17	Wuppertal	358,876	North Rhine-Westphalia
18	Bielefeld	338,332	North Rhine-Westphalia
19	Bonn	336,465	North Rhine-Westphalia
20	Münster	320,946	North Rhine-Westphalia
