= List of cities in Germany by population =

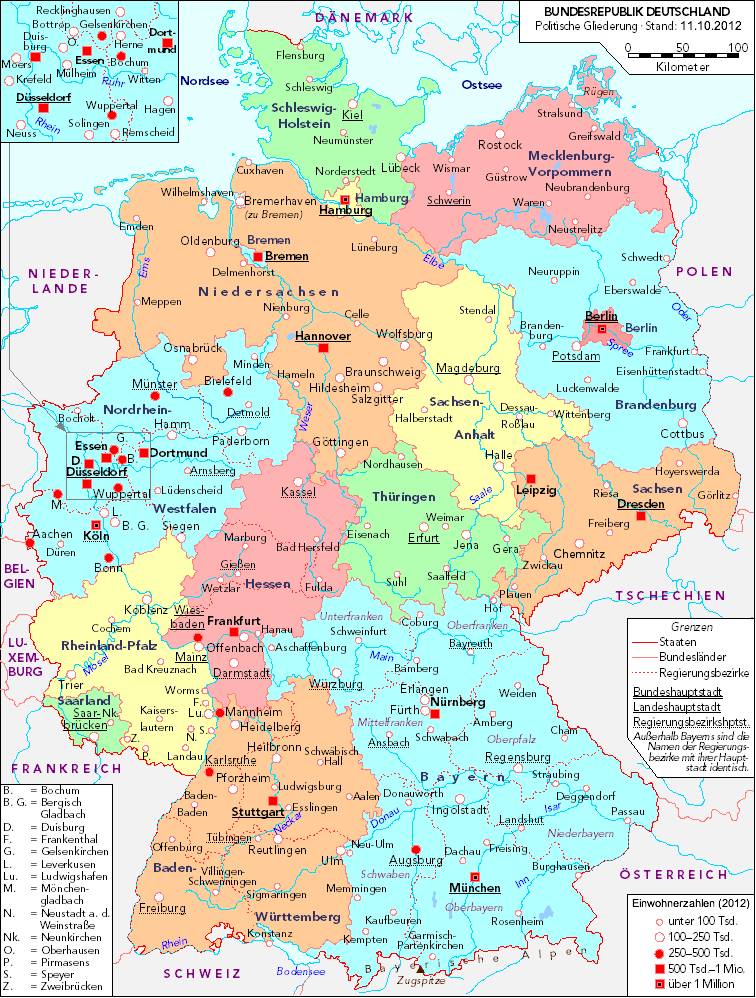
General map of Germany

Population density in 2022

As defined by the German Federal Institute for Research on Building, Urban Affairs and Spatial Development, a Großstadt (large city) is a city with more than 100,000 inhabitants. As of today, 80 cities in Germany fulfill this criterion and are listed here. This list refers only to the population of individual municipalities within their defined limits, which does not include other municipalities or suburban areas within urban agglomerations or metropolitan areas.

== List ==
The following table lists the 80 cities in Germany with a population of at least 100,000 each on 31 December 2021, as estimated by the Federal Statistical Office of Germany. A city is displayed in bold if it is a state or federal capital, and in italics if it is the most populous city in the state. The table below contains the following information:

1. The city rank by population as of 31 December 2021, as estimated by the Federal Statistical Office of Germany
2. The city name
3. The name of the state in which the city lies
4. The city population as of 31 December 2021, as estimated by the Federal Statistical Office of Germany
5. The city population as of 31 December 2015, as estimated by the Federal Statistical Office of Germany
6. The city percentage population change from 31 December 2015 to 31 December 2021
7. The change in city rank by population from 31 December 2015 to 31 December 2021
8. The city land area as of 31 December 2021
9. The city population density as of 31 December 2021 (residents per unit of land area)
10. The city latitude and longitude coordinates.

Schwerin is the only state capital not listed.

2021 rank	City	State	2021 estimate	2015 estimate	Growth	Rank change	2021 land area	2021 population density	Location
1	**Berlin**		3,677,472	3,520,031	+4.47%	0	891.3 km^{2} 344.1 sq mi	4,126/km^{2} 10,690/sq mi	52°31′N 13°23′E
2	**Hamburg**		1,906,411	1,787,408	+6.66%	0	755.2 km^{2} 291.6 sq mi	2,524/km^{2} 6,540/sq mi	53°33′N 10°0′E
3	**Munich** (München)	Bavaria	1,487,708	1,450,381	+2.57%	0	310.7 km^{2} 120.0 sq mi	4,788/km^{2} 12,400/sq mi	48°8′N 11°34′E
4	Cologne (Köln)	North Rhine-Westphalia	1,073,096	1,060,582	+1.18%	0	405.15 km^{2} 156.43 sq mi	2,648/km^{2} 6,860/sq mi	50°56′N 6°57′E
5	Frankfurt am Main	Hesse	759,224	732,688	+3.62%	0	248.31 km^{2} 95.87 sq mi	3,057/km^{2} 7,920/sq mi	50°7′N 8°41′E
6	**Stuttgart**	Baden-Württemberg	626,275	623,738	+0.41%	0	207.33 km^{2} 80.05 sq mi	3,020/km^{2} 7,800/sq mi	48°47′N 9°11′E
7	**Düsseldorf**	North Rhine-Westphalia	619,477	612,178	+1.19%	0	217.41 km^{2} 83.94 sq mi	2,849/km^{2} 7,380/sq mi	51°14′N 6°47′E
8	Leipzig	Saxony	601,866	560,472	+7.39%	▲2	297.4 km^{2} 114.8 sq mi	2,024/km^{2} 5,240/sq mi	51°20′N 12°23′E
9	Dortmund	North Rhine-Westphalia	586,852	586,181	+0.11%	▼1	280.71 km^{2} 108.38 sq mi	2,091/km^{2} 5,420/sq mi	51°31′N 7°28′E
10	Essen	North Rhine-Westphalia	579,432	582,624	−0.55%	▼1	210.34 km^{2} 81.21 sq mi	2,755/km^{2} 7,140/sq mi	51°27′N 7°1′E
11	**Bremen**		563,290	557,464	+1.05%	0	326.7 km^{2} 126.1 sq mi	1,724/km^{2} 4,470/sq mi	53°5′N 8°48′E
12	**Dresden**	Saxony	555,351	543,825	+2.12%	0	328.8 km^{2} 127.0 sq mi	1,689/km^{2} 4,370/sq mi	51°2′N 13°44′E
13	**Hanover** (Hannover)	Lower Saxony	535,932	532,163	+0.71%	0	204.0 km^{2} 78.8 sq mi	2,627/km^{2} 6,800/sq mi	52°22′N 9°43′E
14	Nuremberg (Nürnberg)	Bavaria	510,632	509,975	+0.13%	0	186.5 km^{2} 72.0 sq mi	2,739/km^{2} 7,090/sq mi	49°27′N 11°5′E
15	Duisburg	North Rhine-Westphalia	495,152	491,231	+0.80%	0	232.8 km^{2} 89.9 sq mi	2,127/km^{2} 5,510/sq mi	51°26′N 6°46′E
16	Bochum	North Rhine-Westphalia	363,441	364,742	−0.36%	0	145.4 km^{2} 56.1 sq mi	2,500/km^{2} 6,500/sq mi	51°29′N 7°13′E
17	Wuppertal	North Rhine-Westphalia	354,572	350,046	+1.29%	0	168.4 km^{2} 65.0 sq mi	2,105/km^{2} 5,450/sq mi	51°16′N 7°11′E
18	Bielefeld	North Rhine-Westphalia	334,002	333,090	+0.27%	0	257.8 km^{2} 99.5 sq mi	1,296/km^{2} 3,360/sq mi	52°1′N 8°32′E
19	Bonn	North Rhine-Westphalia	331,885	318,809	+4.10%	0	141.1 km^{2} 54.5 sq mi	2,353/km^{2} 6,090/sq mi	50°44′N 7°6′E
20	Münster	North Rhine-Westphalia	317,713	310,039	+2.48%	0	302.9 km^{2} 117.0 sq mi	1,049/km^{2} 2,720/sq mi	51°58′N 7°38′E
21	Mannheim	Baden-Württemberg	311,831	305,780	+1.98%	▲1	145.0 km^{2} 56.0 sq mi	2,151/km^{2} 5,570/sq mi	49°29′N 8°28′E
22	Karlsruhe	Baden-Württemberg	306,502	307,755	−0.41%	▼1	173.5 km^{2} 67.0 sq mi	1,767/km^{2} 4,580/sq mi	49°0′N 8°24′E
23	Augsburg	Bavaria	296,478	286,374	+3.53%	0	146.8 km^{2} 56.7 sq mi	2,019/km^{2} 5,230/sq mi	48°22′N 10°54′E
24	**Wiesbaden**	Hesse	278,950	276,218	+0.99%	0	203.9 km^{2} 78.7 sq mi	1,368/km^{2} 3,540/sq mi	50°5′N 8°14′E
25	Mönchengladbach	North Rhine-Westphalia	261,001	259,996	+0.39%	▲1	170.4 km^{2} 65.8 sq mi	1,531/km^{2} 3,970/sq mi	51°12′N 6°26′E
26	Gelsenkirchen	North Rhine-Westphalia	260,126	260,368	−0.09%	▼1	104.8 km^{2} 40.5 sq mi	2,481/km^{2} 6,430/sq mi	51°31′N 7°6′E
27	Aachen	North Rhine-Westphalia	249,070	245,885	+1.30%	▲3	160.85 km^{2} 62.10 sq mi	1,548/km^{2} 4,010/sq mi	50°47′N 6°5′E
28	Braunschweig	Lower Saxony	248,823	251,364	−1.01%	▼1	192.1 km^{2} 74.2 sq mi	1,295/km^{2} 3,350/sq mi	52°16′N 10°31′E
29	**Kiel**	Schleswig-Holstein	246,243	246,306	−0.03%	0	118.6 km^{2} 45.8 sq mi	2,076/km^{2} 5,380/sq mi	54°20′N 10°8′E
30	Chemnitz	Saxony	243,105	248,645	−2.23%	▼2	220.85 km^{2} 85.27 sq mi	1,101/km^{2} 2,850/sq mi	50°50′N 12°55′E
31	Halle (Saale)	Saxony-Anhalt	238,061	236,991	+0.45%	0	135.0 km^{2} 52.1 sq mi	1,763/km^{2} 4,570/sq mi	51°29′N 11°58′E
32	**Magdeburg**	Saxony-Anhalt	236,188	235,723	+0.20%	0	201.0 km^{2} 77.6 sq mi	1,175/km^{2} 3,040/sq mi	52°8′N 11°37′E
33	Freiburg im Breisgau	Baden-Württemberg	231,848	226,393	+2.41%	0	153.1 km^{2} 59.1 sq mi	1,514/km^{2} 3,920/sq mi	47°59′N 7°51′E
34	Krefeld	North Rhine-Westphalia	227,050	225,144	+0.85%	0	137.7 km^{2} 53.2 sq mi	1,649/km^{2} 4,270/sq mi	51°20′N 6°34′E
35	**Mainz**	Rhineland-Palatinate	217,556	209,779	+3.71%	▲3	97.7 km^{2} 37.7 sq mi	2,226/km^{2} 5,770/sq mi	50°0′N 8°16′E
36	Lübeck	Schleswig-Holstein	216,277	216,253	+0.01%	▼1	214.1 km^{2} 82.7 sq mi	1,010/km^{2} 2,600/sq mi	53°52′N 10°41′E
37	**Erfurt**	Thuringia	213,227	210,118	+1.48%	0	269.2 km^{2} 103.9 sq mi	792/km^{2} 2,050/sq mi	50°59′N 11°2′E
38	Oberhausen	North Rhine-Westphalia	208,752	210,934	−1.03%	▼2	77.0 km^{2} 29.7 sq mi	2,710/km^{2} 7,000/sq mi	51°28′N 6°51′E
39	Rostock	Mecklenburg-Vorpommern	208,400	206,011	+1.16%	0	181.4 km^{2} 70.0 sq mi	1,149/km^{2} 2,980/sq mi	54°5′N 12°8′E
40	Kassel	Hesse	200,406	197,984	+1.22%	0	107.0 km^{2} 41.3 sq mi	1,873/km^{2} 4,850/sq mi	51°19′N 9°30′E
41	Hagen	North Rhine-Westphalia	188,713	189,044	−0.18%	0	160.4 km^{2} 61.9 sq mi	1,177/km^{2} 3,050/sq mi	51°22′N 7°29′E
42	**Potsdam**	Brandenburg	183,154	167,745	+9.19%	▲3	187.3 km^{2} 72.3 sq mi	978/km^{2} 2,530/sq mi	52°24′N 13°4′E
43	**Saarbrücken**	Saarland	179,634	178,151	+0.83%	0	167.1 km^{2} 64.5 sq mi	1,075/km^{2} 2,780/sq mi	49°14′N 7°0′E
44	Hamm	North Rhine-Westphalia	179,238	179,397	−0.09%	▼2	226.3 km^{2} 87.4 sq mi	792/km^{2} 2,050/sq mi	51°41′N 7°49′E
45	Ludwigshafen am Rhein	Rhineland-Palatinate	172,145	164,718	+4.51%	▲1	77.7 km^{2} 30.0 sq mi	2,216/km^{2} 5,740/sq mi	49°29′N 8°26′E
46	Mülheim an der Ruhr	North Rhine-Westphalia	170,739	169,278	+0.86%	▼2	91.3 km^{2} 35.3 sq mi	1,871/km^{2} 4,850/sq mi	51°26′N 6°53′E
47	Oldenburg	Lower Saxony	170,389	163,830	+4.00%	0	103.0 km^{2} 39.8 sq mi	1,655/km^{2} 4,290/sq mi	53°8′N 8°13′E
48	Osnabrück	Lower Saxony	165,034	162,403	+1.62%	▲1	119.8 km^{2} 46.3 sq mi	1,378/km^{2} 3,570/sq mi	52°17′N 8°3′E
49	Leverkusen	North Rhine-Westphalia	163,851	163,487	+0.22%	▼1	78.9 km^{2} 30.5 sq mi	2,078/km^{2} 5,380/sq mi	51°2′N 6°59′E
50	Darmstadt	Hesse	159,631	155,353	+2.75%	▲4	122.2 km^{2} 47.2 sq mi	1,306/km^{2} 3,380/sq mi	49°52′N 8°39′E
51	Heidelberg	Baden-Württemberg	159,245	156,267	+1.91%	0	108.8 km^{2} 42.0 sq mi	1,463/km^{2} 3,790/sq mi	49°25′N 8°43′E
52	Solingen	North Rhine-Westphalia	158,957	158,726	+0.15%	▼2	89.5 km^{2} 34.6 sq mi	1,777/km^{2} 4,600/sq mi	51°10′N 7°5′E
53	Herne	North Rhine-Westphalia	156,621	155,851	+0.49%	▼1	51.4 km^{2} 19.8 sq mi	3,047/km^{2} 7,890/sq mi	51°33′N 7°13′E
54	Regensburg	Bavaria	153,542	145,465	+5.55%	▲2	80.8 km^{2} 31.2 sq mi	1,901/km^{2} 4,920/sq mi	49°1′N 12°5′E
55	Neuss	North Rhine-Westphalia	152,731	155,414	−1.73%	▲2	99.5 km^{2} 38.4 sq mi	1,535/km^{2} 3,980/sq mi	51°12′N 6°42′E
56	Paderborn	North Rhine-Westphalia	152,531	148,126	+2.97%	▼1	179.4 km^{2} 69.3 sq mi	850/km^{2} 2,200/sq mi	51°43′N 8°46′E
57	Ingolstadt	Bavaria	138,016	132,438	+4.21%	0	133.4 km^{2} 51.5 sq mi	1,035/km^{2} 2,680/sq mi	48°46′N 11°26′E
58	Offenbach am Main	Hesse	131,295	123,734	+6.11%	▲3	44.9 km^{2} 17.3 sq mi	2,924/km^{2} 7,570/sq mi	50°6′N 8°48′E
59	Fürth	Bavaria	129,122	124,171	+3.99%	0	63.4 km^{2} 24.5 sq mi	2,038/km^{2} 5,280/sq mi	49°28′N 11°0′E
60	Ulm	Baden-Württemberg	126,949	122,636	+3.52%	▲2	118.7 km^{2} 45.8 sq mi	1,070/km^{2} 2,800/sq mi	48°24′N 9°59′E
61	Würzburg	Bavaria	126,933	124,873	+1.65%	▼3	87.6 km^{2} 33.8 sq mi	1,449/km^{2} 3,750/sq mi	49°47′N 9°56′E
62	Heilbronn	Baden-Württemberg	125,613	122,567	+2.49%	▲1	99.9 km^{2} 38.6 sq mi	1,258/km^{2} 3,260/sq mi	49°9′N 9°13′E
63	Pforzheim	Baden-Württemberg	125,529	122,247	+2.68%	▲1	98.0 km^{2} 37.8 sq mi	1,281/km^{2} 3,320/sq mi	48°54′N 8°43′E
64	Wolfsburg	Lower Saxony	123,949	124,045	−0.08%	▼4	204.0 km^{2} 78.8 sq mi	608/km^{2} 1,570/sq mi	52°25′23″N 10°47′14″E
65	Bottrop	North Rhine-Westphalia	117,311	117,143	+0.14%	▲1	100.7 km^{2} 38.9 sq mi	1,165/km^{2} 3,020/sq mi	51°31′29″N 6°55′22″E
66	Göttingen	Lower Saxony	116,557	118,914	−1.98%	▼1	116.9 km^{2} 45.1 sq mi	997/km^{2} 2,580/sq mi	51°32′N 9°56′E
67	Reutlingen	Baden-Württemberg	116,456	114,310	+1.88%	▲2	87.1 km^{2} 33.6 sq mi	1,338/km^{2} 3,470/sq mi	48°29′N 9°13′E
68	Koblenz	Rhineland-Palatinate	113,638	112,586	+0.93%	▲3	105.0 km^{2} 40.5 sq mi	1,082/km^{2} 2,800/sq mi	50°21′35″N 7°35′52″E
69	Erlangen	Bavaria	113,292	108,336	+4.57%	▲6	77.0 km^{2} 29.7 sq mi	1,472/km^{2} 3,810/sq mi	49°35′N 11°1′E
70	Bremerhaven	Bremen	113,173	114,025	−0.75%	0	93.8 km^{2} 36.2 sq mi	1,206/km^{2} 3,120/sq mi	53°33′N 8°35′E
71	Remscheid	North Rhine-Westphalia	111,770	109,499	+2.07%	▲3	74.6 km^{2} 28.8 sq mi	1,498/km^{2} 3,880/sq mi	51°11′N 7°12′E
72	Bergisch Gladbach	North Rhine-Westphalia	111,645	111,366	+0.25%	0	83.1 km^{2} 32.1 sq mi	1,343/km^{2} 3,480/sq mi	51°0′N 7°7′E
73	Recklinghausen	North Rhine-Westphalia	110,714	114,330	−3.16%	▼5	66.4 km^{2} 25.6 sq mi	1,667/km^{2} 4,320/sq mi	51°35′6″N 7°9′43″E
74	Trier	Rhineland-Palatinate	110,570	114,914	−3.78%	▼7	117.1 km^{2} 45.2 sq mi	945/km^{2} 2,450/sq mi	49°45′N 6°38′E
75	Jena	Thuringia	110,502	109,527	+0.89%	▼2	114.8 km^{2} 44.3 sq mi	963/km^{2} 2,490/sq mi	50°55′38″N 11°35′10″E
76	Moers	North Rhine-Westphalia	103,725	104,529	−0.77%	0	67.7 km^{2} 26.1 sq mi	1,533/km^{2} 3,970/sq mi	51°27′33″N 6°37′11″E
77	Salzgitter	Lower Saxony	103,694	101,079	+2.59%	▲2	223.9 km^{2} 86.4 sq mi	463/km^{2} 1,200/sq mi	52°9′N 10°20′E
78	Siegen	North Rhine-Westphalia	101,516	102,355	−0.82%	▼1	114.7 km^{2} 44.3 sq mi	885/km^{2} 2,290/sq mi	50°53′N 8°1′E
79	Gütersloh	North Rhine-Westphalia	101,158	97,586	+3.66%	▲3	112.0 km^{2} 43.2 sq mi	896/km^{2} 2,320/sq mi	51°54′N 8°23′E
80	Hildesheim	Lower Saxony	100,319	101,667	−1.33%	▼2	92.2 km^{2} 35.6 sq mi	1,088/km^{2} 2,820/sq mi	52°9′N 9°57′E

== See also ==
- List of cities and towns in Germany
- List of towns and cities in Germany by historical population
- List of municipalities in Germany
- Metropolitan regions in Germany
