= Cluj-Napoca Piarists' Church =

Heritage site in Cluj County, Romania

Coordinates: 46.767814°N 23.590399°E

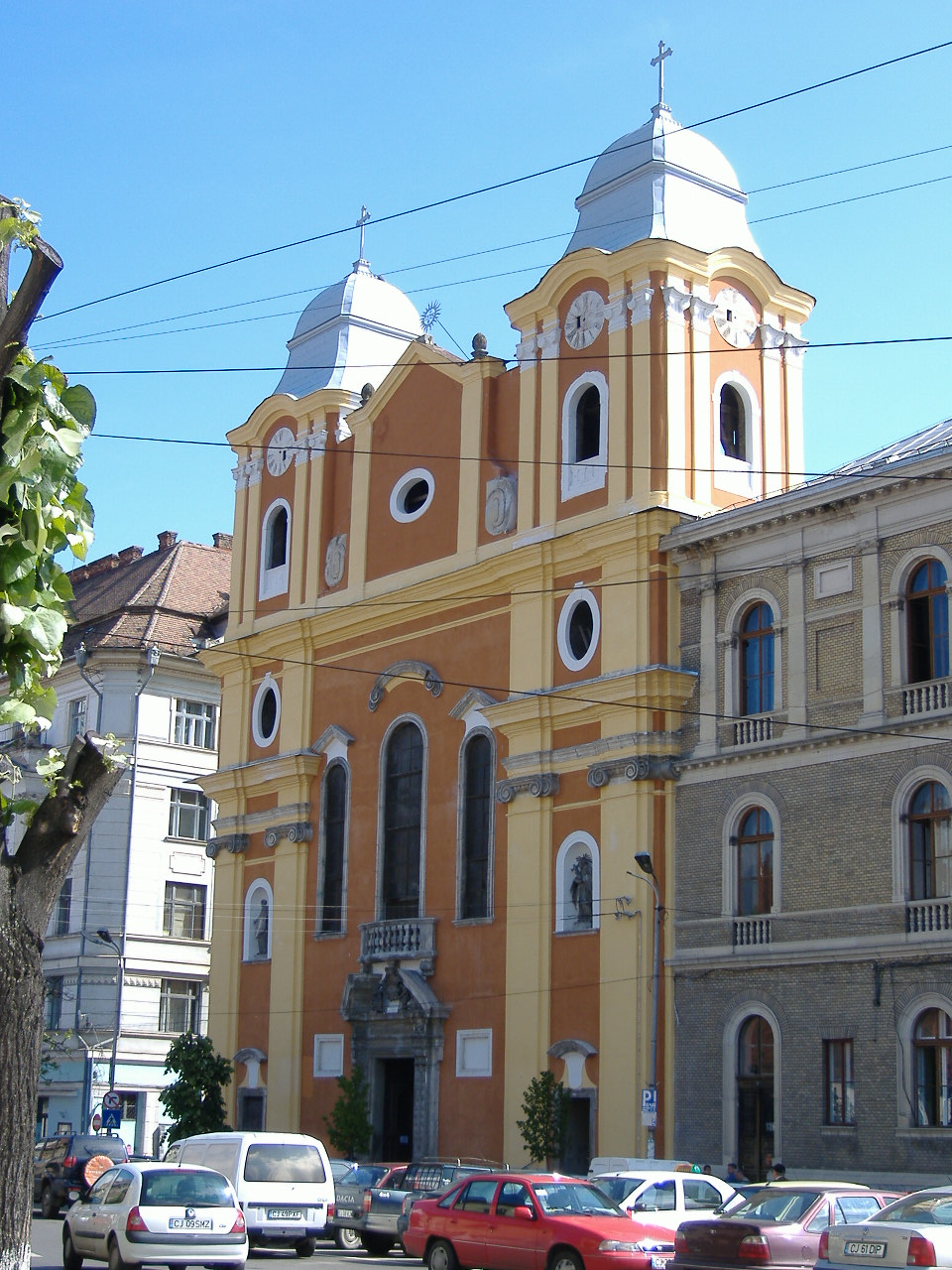
Main façade, lateral view.

The Piarist Church (Romanian: Biserica Piariștilor, also known as the Jesuit Church (Biserica Iezuiților) or the University Church (Biserica Universității); Hungarian: piarista templom), located at 5 Str. Universității, Cluj-Napoca, Romania, and dedicated to the Holy Trinity, was the first Roman Catholic church built in Transylvania after the Protestant Reformation, as well as the province's first Baroque church building. Among the city's more notable edifices, it served as a prototype for numerous other churches in Transylvania. It features a strong contrast between the sober exterior and a very well-decorated, almost exuberant interior. A statue of the Virgin Mary stood in front of the church until 1959, when the Communist authorities moved it to another part of the city.

== History ==
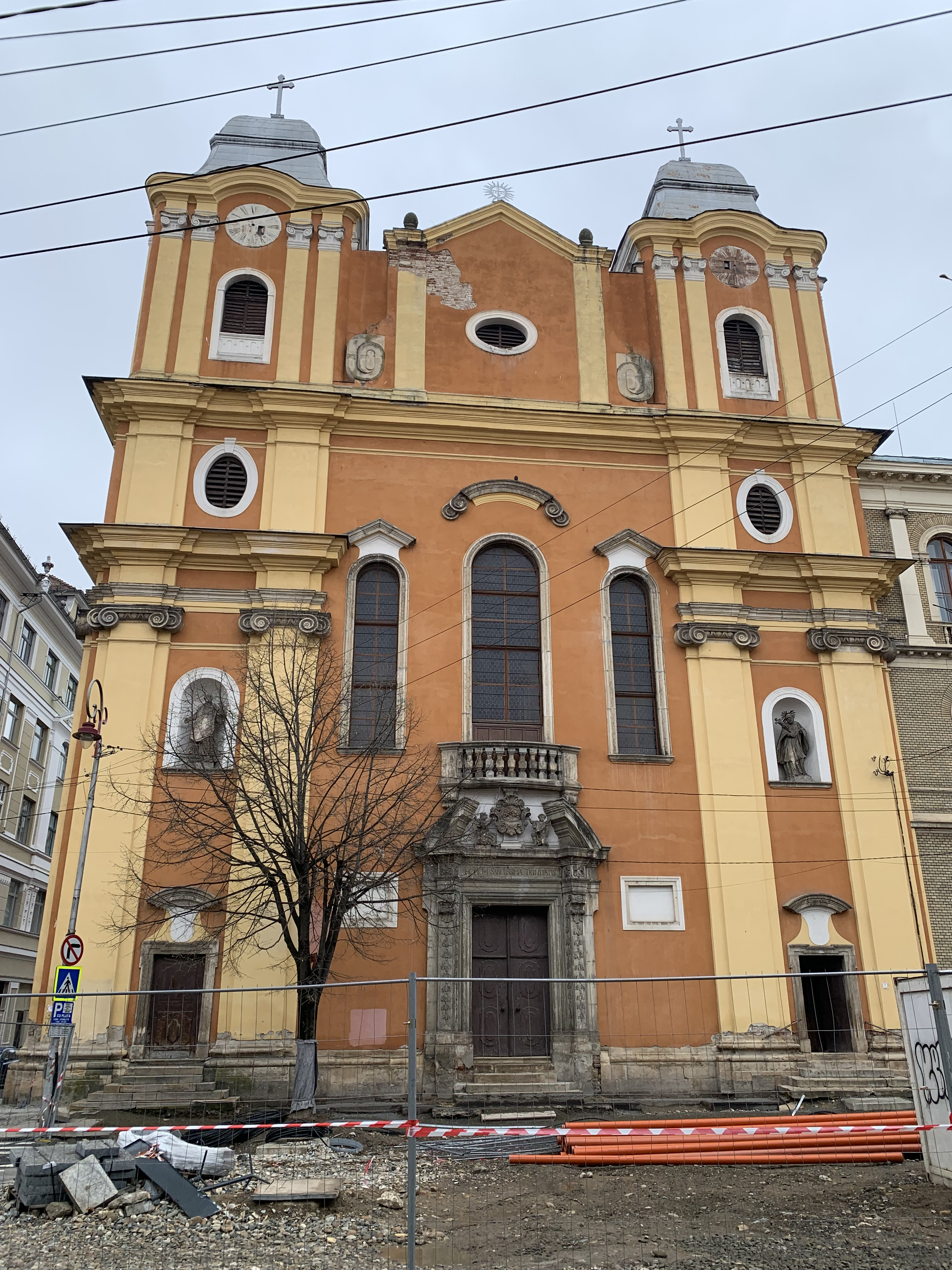
Main façade, frontal view.

On 13 March 1718, Jesuit priests began a fundraising campaign in order to build the church. Bishop Georgius Martonfi laid the cornerstone; the church was completed in 1724 and consecrated the following year by Bishop Joannes Antalfi. The Jesuits were suppressed in 1773 by Pope Clement XIV, so in 1776 Empress Maria Theresa transferred the church to the Piarists.

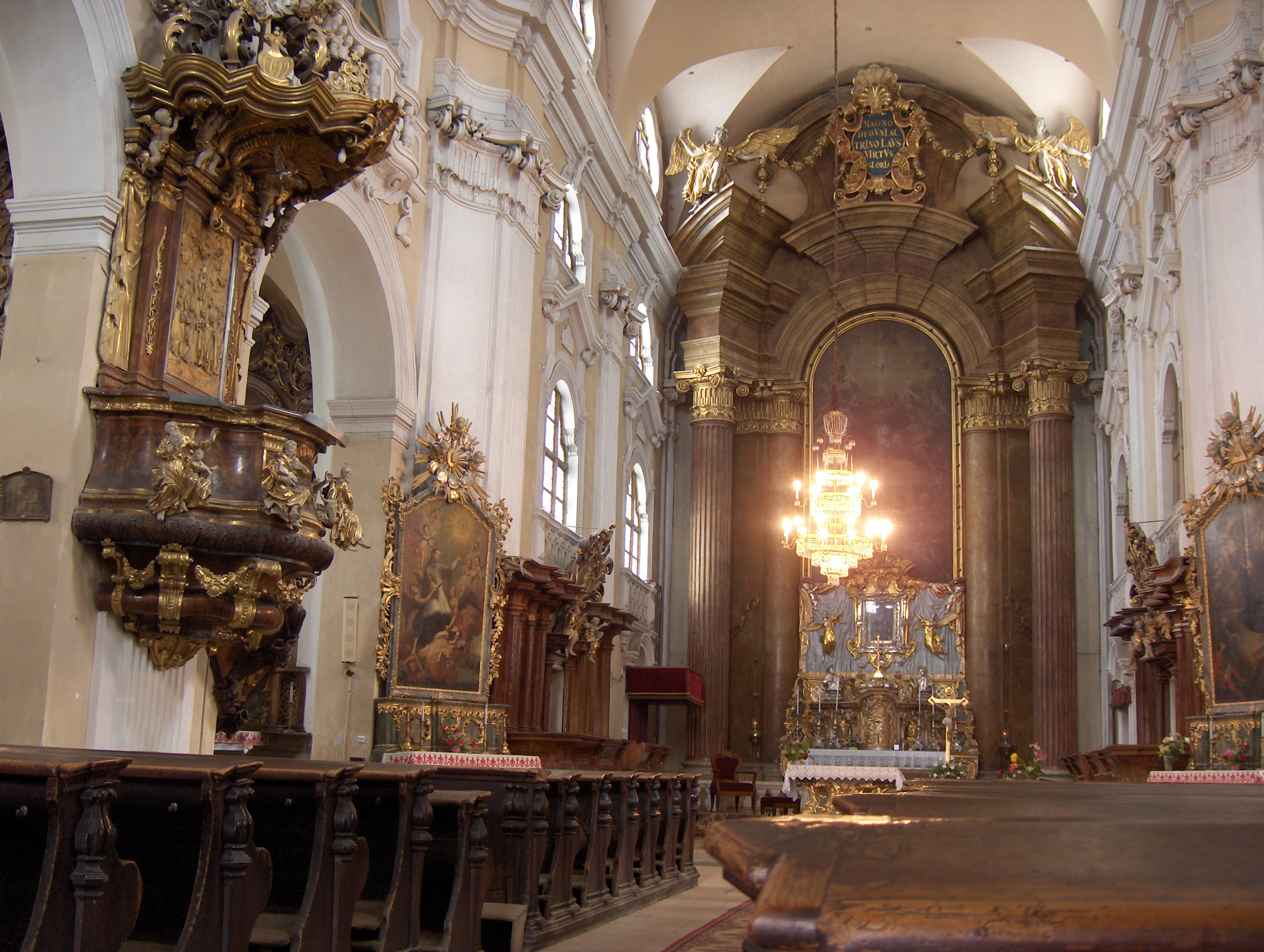
The church's interior.

The church was restored in 1775, 1831, 1943, 1970 and 2005-6.

On 12 August 1956, priests and some 5,000 lay members of the Romanian Greek-Catholic Church (who appeared on very short notice) organised a protest before the church. Its purpose was to demonstrate that their church, banned in 1948, had not ceased to exist, as the regime claimed. Initially they attempted to enter the church and hold mass, but the Roman Catholic priests did not allow them inside for fear of reprisals. Thus an open-air mass was held in front of the church; Fr. Vasile Chindriș in his sermon openly criticised the Communist leadership before masses of worshipers. Every priest who officiated at the liturgy was later arrested and imprisoned. Among the lay persons punished was Vasile Fărcaș, president of the Cluj Tribunal in the interwar period, who served nearly 8 years of a ten-year sentence, and his wife Eugenia.

== Description ==
The church has two clock towers, each 45 m high. There are three narrow vertical windows above the entrance, meant to help illuminate the interior. The main door is surrounded by rich ornamentation; above it there is a bas-relief of the Trinity with the Latin inscription Honori Sanctissimae Trinitatis ("In Honour of the Most Holy Trinity"). There are two smaller doors to the left and the right of this one; above each of them is a sculpture of a saint resting in a niche – Ignatius of Loyola and Francis Xavier, works of the Bavarian artist Johannes König. Previously, statues of saints John of Nepomuk and Aloysius Gonzaga, also by König, stood near the side entrances.

In contrast to the simple exterior, the interior is lavishly ornamented. The building has a single nave, 45 m long and 24 m high. There are three chapels on the sides, each with its own altar and adorned with several paintings. On the walls are to be found the devotional plaques common to Roman Catholic churches, written in Transylvania's main historical languages: Romanian, Hungarian, German and Latin.

The main altar near the choir is grandiose. On the upper part is the Latin inscription Magno Deo uni ac trino laus virtus gloria ("To the one and triune great God praise, honour and glory"), between two angels. The altar is dedicated to the Trinity. Upon it rests an icon of the Virgin Mary, painted on wood and framed in metal; a number of people reported that it shed tears over a two-week period in 1699. This may be the original wonder-working icon from Nicula Monastery. Below it are two statues of Jesuit saints, Francis and Ignatius, brought from Vienna in 1726.

The pulpit, the work of Anton Schuchbauer, is decorated on the outside with relief carvings of the Four Evangelists, and in between the pulpit and its crown there is a bas-relief with the most important Jesuit saints. Saint Michael is depicted on the pulpit's crown.

Underneath the church building there is a crypt with 140 graves.

== See also ==
- List of Jesuit sites
