= St. Stephanus, Bork =

Coordinates: 51°39′54″N 7°27′58″E

St. Stephanus
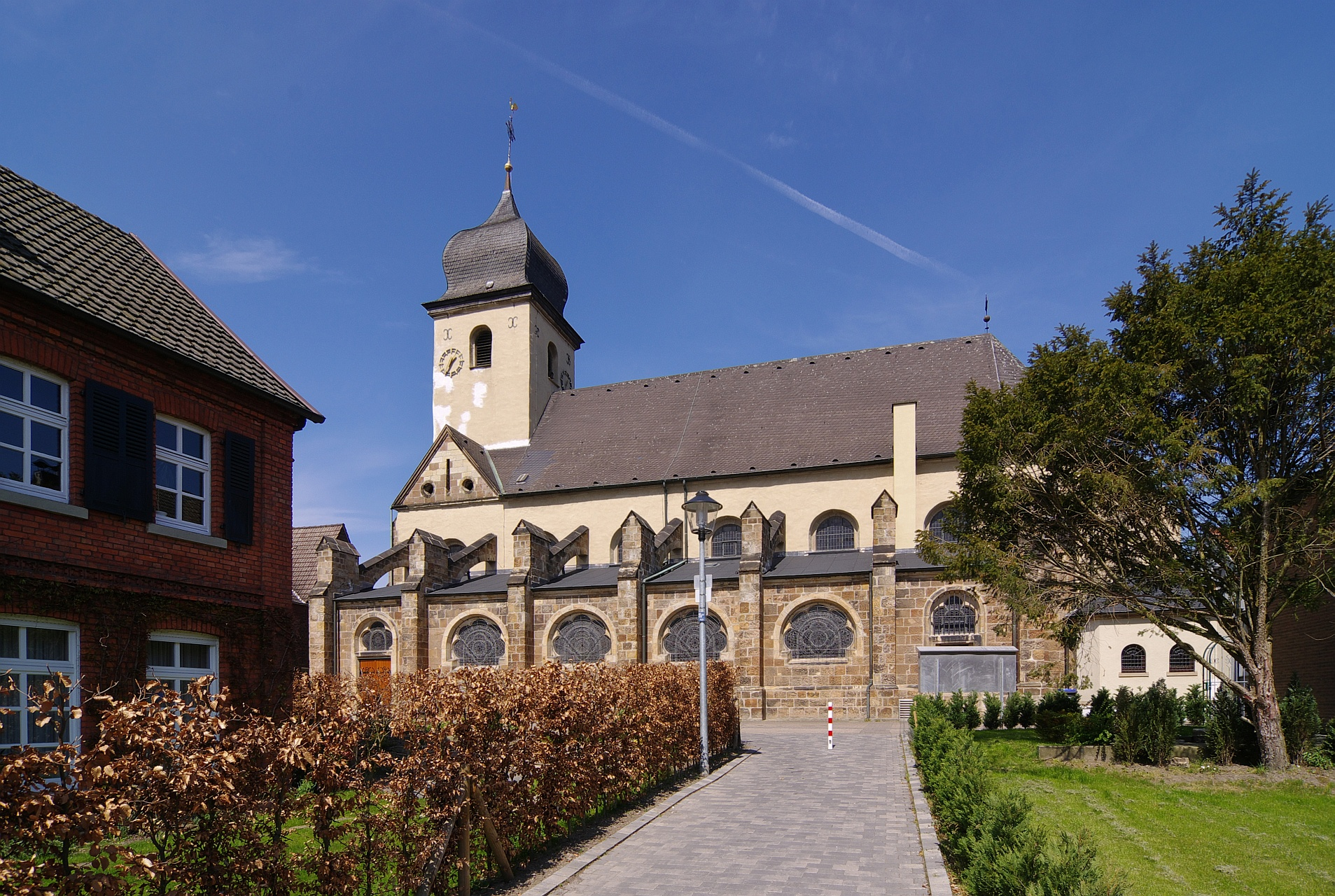
- St. Stephanus from the cemetery

- Location: Selm-Bork
- Denomination: Catholic
- Website: stludger-selm.de

History
- Dedication: St. Stephen the Martyr
- Consecrated: 1724

Administration
- Diocese: Münster

St. Stephanus is a church and a former parish in Bork, now part of Selm, North Rhine-Westphalia, Germany. It was completed in 1724 in Baroque style and expanded in the 1880s based on a design by Wilhelm Rincklake. The church is a listed monument. The parish was merged with St. Ludger, Selm, in 1976.

== History and architecture ==
The parish of St. Stephanus was founded between 1022 and 1032, when it was split from a parish in Werne. Dedicated to St. Stephen the Martyr, it belonged to Cappenberg Abbey from 1175 to 1803, with convent brothers serving as ministers in Bork. In the 17th century, the parish church suffered damage during several wars. The tower, along with the bells, collapsed in 1716, falling onto the church and severely damaging it, rendering the building unsafe and beyond repair.

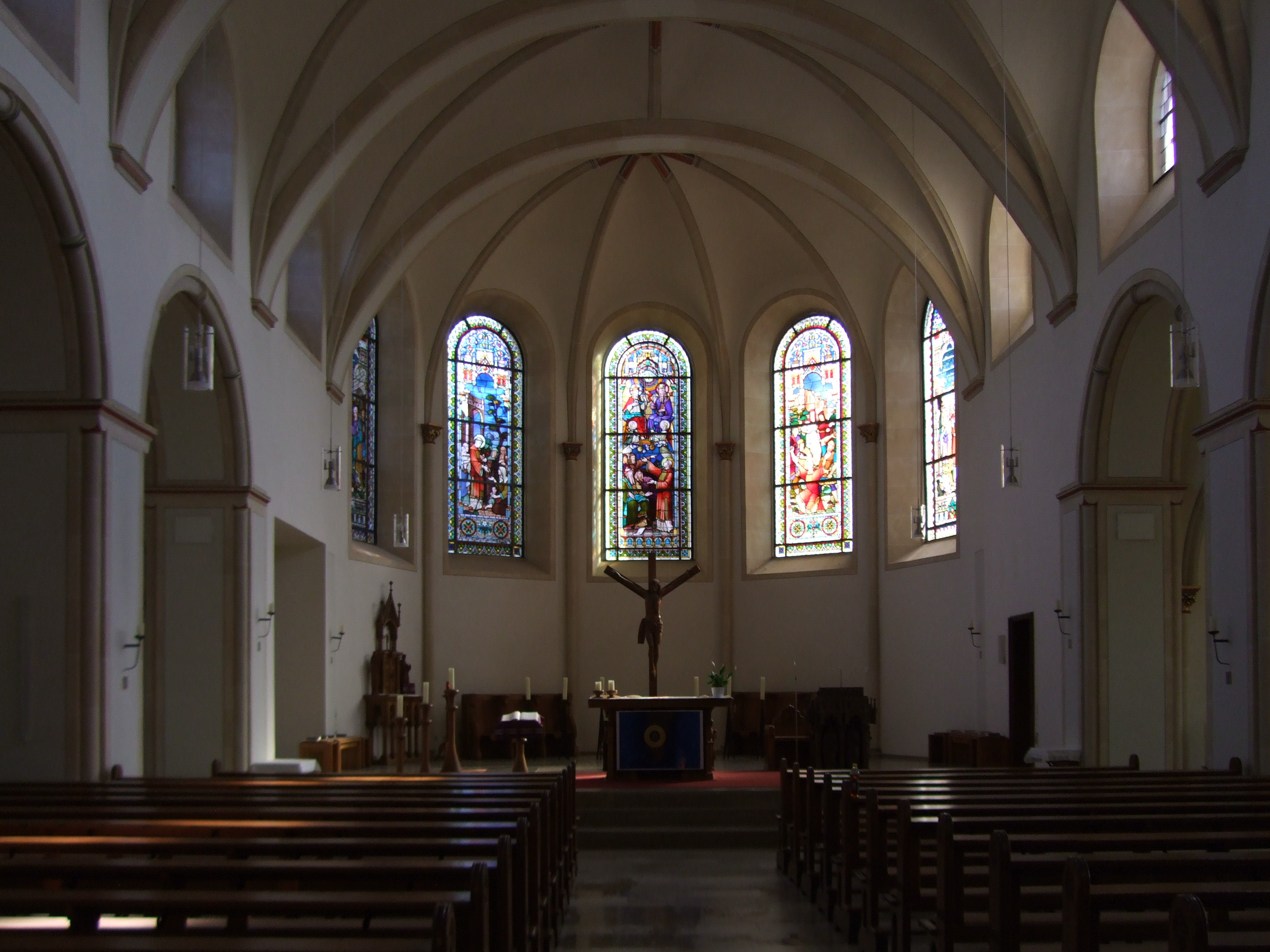
Choir with windows from the nave

The present church was built between 1718 and 1724 in the Baroque style, designed as a vaulted, aisleless church from plastered rubble masonry. The helm of the west tower was added in 1776. From 1884 to 1886, the building was expanded by adding further aisles, on a design in Romanesque-Revival style by Kirchenbaumeister (master church builder) Wilhelm Rincklake. Some pieces of the 1886 furnishings still survive. Around 1900, the windows were decorated with stained glass. The windows along the nave were purely ornamental, while the five windows behind the altar show scenes from the life of St. Stephen, the patron saint. The walls were painted in 1928, but re-plastered in 1957. The interior was remodelled in 1969, in accordance with the recommendations of the Second Vatican Council. A large wooden 18th-century crucifix, which had served as a wayside cross, was positioned behind the new altar.

Bork became part of Selm in 1975, and the parish was subsequently merged with St. Ludger, Selm, in 2008. It is located within the Diocese of Münster. The church has been a listed monument since 13 October 1986.

== Source ==
- Georg Dehio: Handbuch der deutschen Kunstdenkmäler. Nordrhein-Westfalen II Westfalen. Deutscher Kunstverlag, Berlin/München 2011 ISBN 978-3-422-03114-2
