= Selm =

- Town
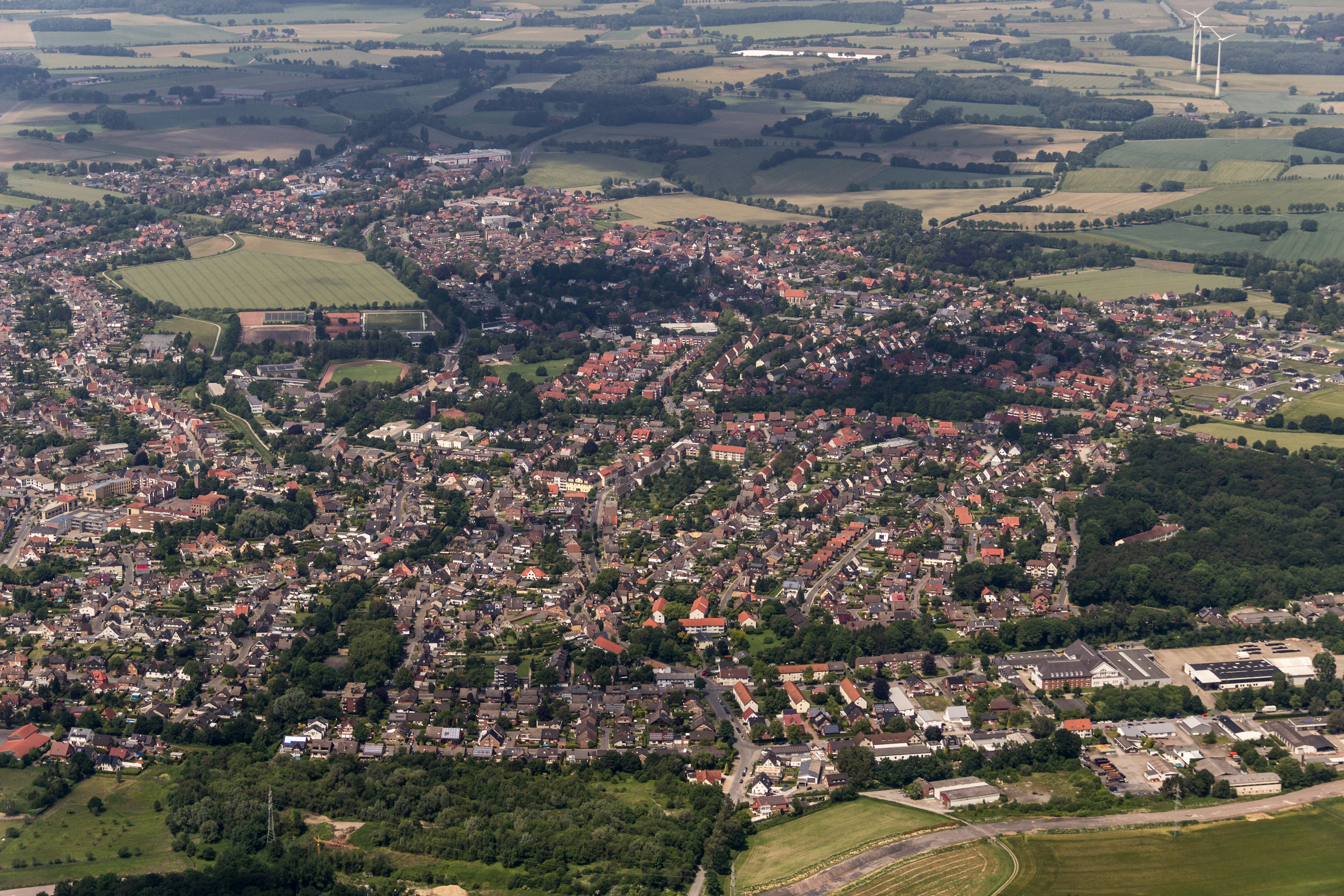

- Coat of arms

- Location of Selm within Unna district
- Interactive map of Selm
- Location within Germany Location within North Rhine-Westphalia
- Coordinates: 51°41′N 7°29′E
- Country: Germany
- State: North Rhine-Westphalia
- Admin. region: Arnsberg
- District: Unna

Government
  - Mayor (2025–): Heinz-Georg Mors (CDU)

Area
  - Total: 60.41 km^{2} (23.32 sq mi)
- Elevation: 111 m (364 ft)

Population (2025-12-31)
  - Total: 25,817
  - Density: 427.4/km^{2} (1,107/sq mi)
- Time zone: UTC+01:00 (CET)
  - Summer (DST): UTC+02:00 (CEST)
- Postal codes: 59379
- Dialling codes: 02592, 02306
- Vehicle registration: UN
- Website: www.selm.de

Selm (German pronunciation: [zɛlm]) is a town in the district of Unna, in North Rhine-Westphalia, Germany. It is situated approximately 20 kilometers north of Dortmund and 25 kilometers west of Hamm.

== Geography ==
The town belongs to the southern part of the Münsterland. It is surrounded by (beginning in the west) Olfen, Lüdinghausen, Nordkirchen (all in the district of Coesfeld), Werne, Lünen (both in the district of Unna), Waltrop, and Datteln (both belonging to the district of Recklinghausen).

== History ==
The first traces of living people in the area date from the younger half of the Stone Age.

In 858 it was mentioned as Seliheim in the Dreingau.

In the early Middle Ages Selm was ruled by the count of Cappenberg, then by the bishop of Münster. In the beginning of the 19th century it was transferred to Prussia, to which it remained, as part of the province of Westphalia, until 1946.

In 1906 the coal mine Zeche Hermann was established, transferring coal from 1,200 m under underground. The coal miners and their families lived in the Beifang quarter, which had in the origin a very rural landscape. The number of inhabitants increased from 2,000 to 10,000 in only one year, with c. 3,500 coal miners working at the plant. In 1926 the coal mine was closed.

After World War II numerous inhabitants from Beifang found work in Lünen, in a coal mine called Zeche Minister Achenbach. They were brought to that coal mine by buses. After 1965 when the houses in Beifang were sold a lot of people from the south came to Selm to live there.

In 1975 Bork, a village in the southern neighbourhood, was annexed to a part of Selm, which obtained city status in 1977. The Baroque church in Bork, St. Stephanus, was built in the 1720s.

Selm is twinned with Workington in the United Kingdom.

== Population ==
Historical population

Year	Pop.	±% p.a.
1965	21,939	—
1970	22,440	+0.45%
1975	22,850	+0.36%
1980	23,752	+0.78%
1985	25,472	+1.41%
1990	24,891	−0.46%
1995	26,214	+1.04%

Year	Pop.	±% p.a.
2000	27,240	+0.77%
2005	27,472	+0.17%
2010	27,001	−0.35%
2015	26,603	−0.30%
2020	25,802	−0.61%
2025	25,817	+0.01%

Source: Landesdatabank Nordrhein-Westfalen
