= Happel =

Happel is a surname of German origin. Notable people with the surname include:

- Carl Happel (1819-1914), German painter
- Eberhard Werner Happel (1647–1690), German author, novelist, journalist and polymath
- Ernst Happel (1925–1992), Austrian football player and coach
- Otto Happel (born 1948), German billionaire businessman
