= Bock GmbH =

Danfoss Bock (Danfoss Climate Solutions)
- Company type: Limited liability company (Gesellschaft mit beschränkter Haftung)
- Industry: Refrigeration technology
- Founded: 1932
- Headquarters: Frickenhausen, Germany
- Products: Compressors & condensing units for stationary, mobile refrigeration and air conditioning
- Website: bock.danfoss.com

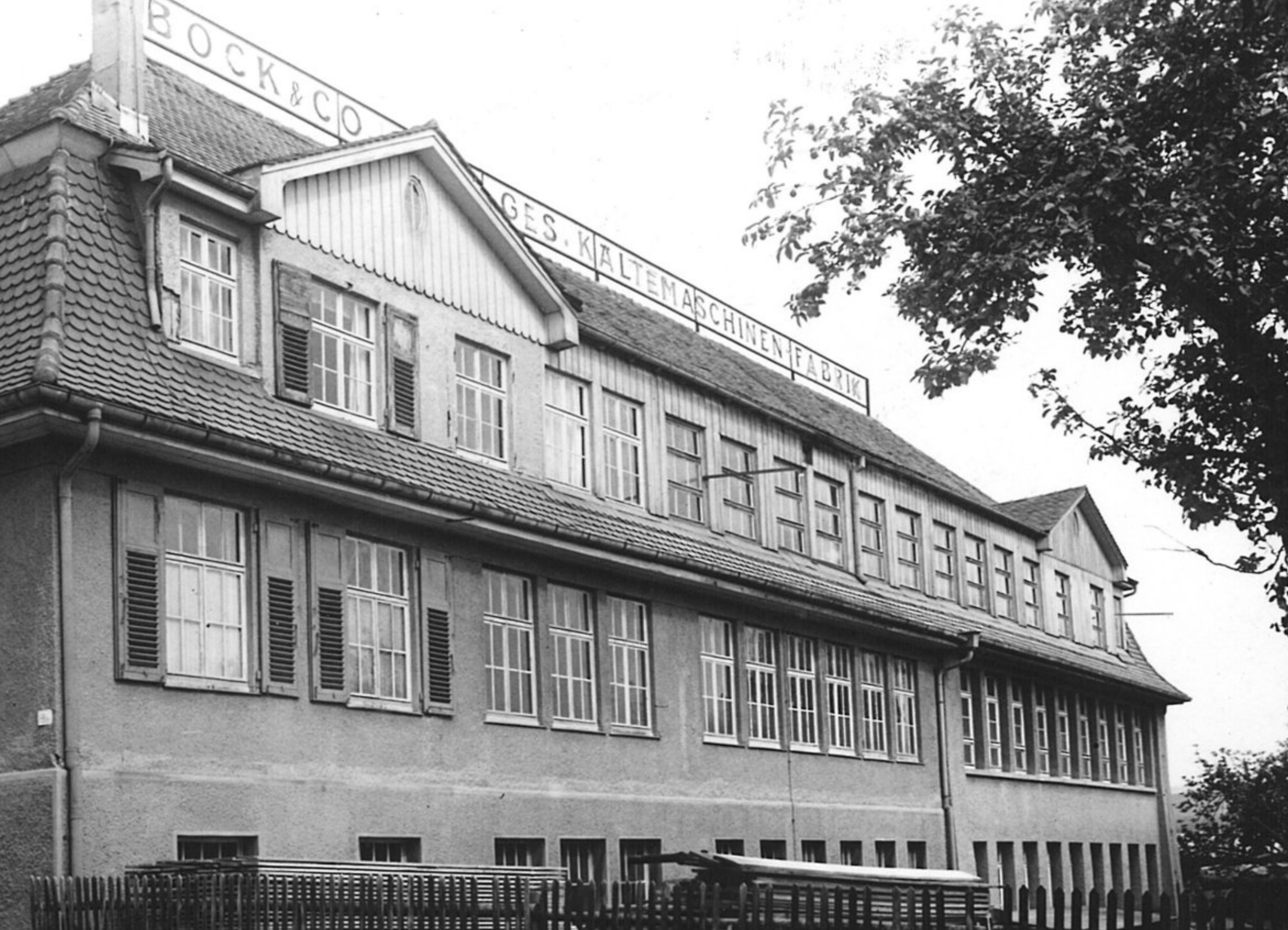
Headquarters of Bock GmbH in Nürtingen until 1993.

Bock GmbH is part of the Danfoss Group since March 2023. The company is a manufacturer of compressors and condensing units for stationary and mobile refrigeration and air-conditioning. The products are exclusively used in commercial and industrial environments.

== History ==
In 1932, Wilhelm Bock and Hans Göldner founded the company in Stuttgart with the purpose of installing and repairing refrigeration units. In 1937, the company moved into a bigger building in Nürtingen and started its own production.

In 1938, Hans Göldner left the company and was replaced by Hugo Bock, resulting in the new company Bock & Co. KG.

Bock also turned to the field of automotive air conditioning systems in the 1960s, becoming one of the pioneers in the process. The company developed and built the first air conditioning units "made in Germany" for cars that were not only used in luxury cars - even the Volkswagen beetle had a Bock air-conditioning system.

Since 31 March 2011, Bock was part of the Segment Refrigeration Technologies of the GEA Group and changed its name into GEA Bock GmbH. GEA Refrigeration Technologies – international market leader for industrial refrigeration systems - have specialized in the development, construction, installation, service and maintenance of components. Typical applications are cooling processes for the food and beverage industries, marine, oil and gas industries, buildings, as well as leisure facilities such as indoor ski centers and ice-skating rinks.

Danfoss formally completed acquisition of Bock GmbH on 1 March 2023 and integrated it into its Climate Solutions Division.

== Products ==
Mobile compressors are mainly used for the air-conditioning of buses. Bock is the leading European manufacturer in this segment, and supplier of all major system- and bus manufacturers. Their compressors are also used worldwide in trains and ships for cooling and air-conditioning.

In the case of stationary applications, examples can be found in all areas of refrigeration, such as supermarkets, warehouses, fruit stores, bakeries, the beverage and chemical industry etc. During recent years, building air-conditioning has become another important sector of application.

The firm produces Semi-Hermetic Compressors (either suction gas cooled. air-cooled or radial-piston), Open Type Compressors, Vehicle Compressors, and Open type Motor Compressors.

== Production and subsidiaries ==
- Frickenhausen, Germany
- Stribro, Czech Republic
- Suzhou, China
- Bangalore, India
