= Milker =

Milker may refer to:

- Automatic milking, milk extraction from dairy animals via a machine
- Milkmaid, a person who milks animals
- An animal that yields milk, in a dairy
  - Dairy cattle, cows bred for their milk production
