= Oelde =

- Town
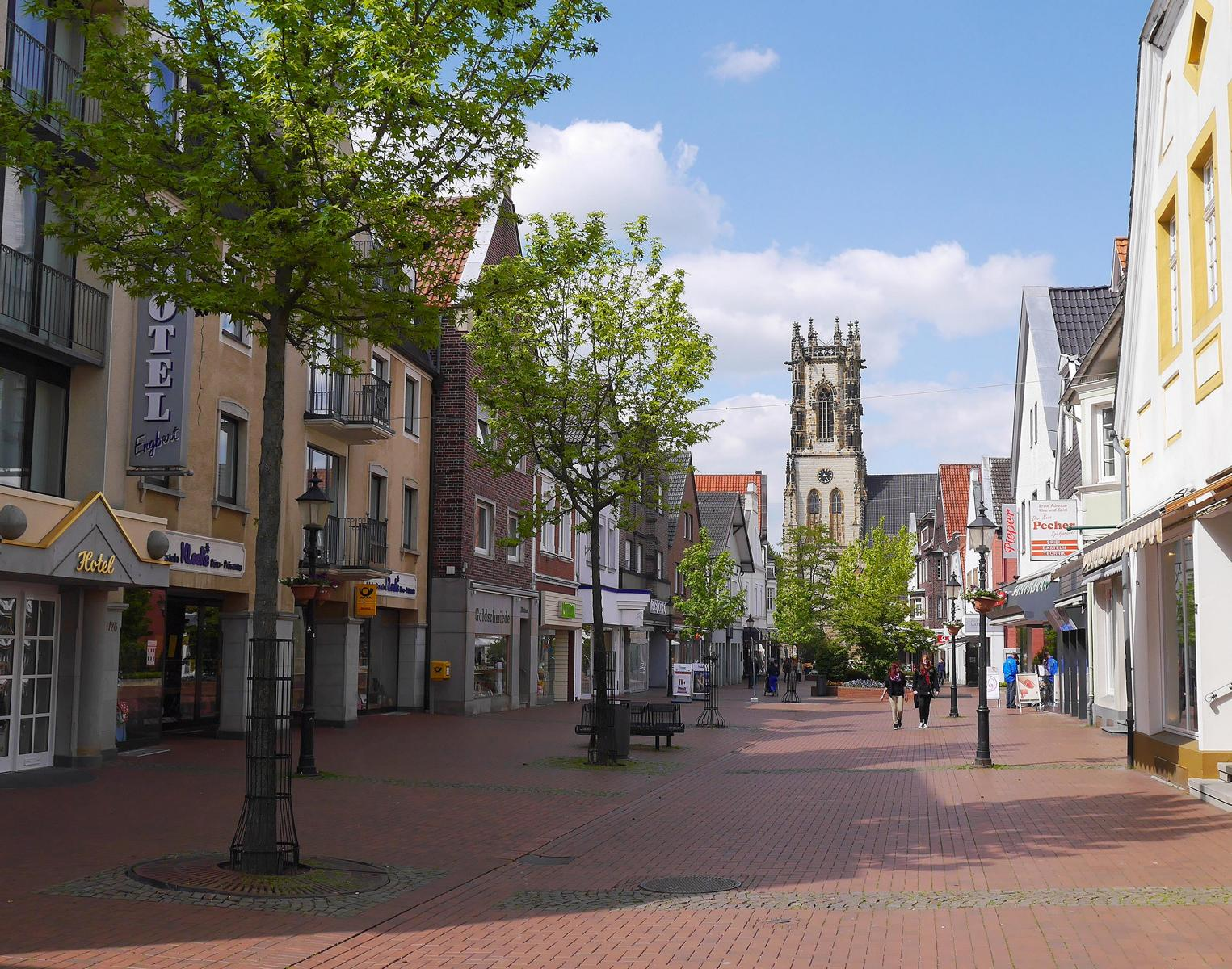
- Lange Street - Oelde centre

- Flag Coat of arms

- Location of Oelde within Warendorf district
- Interactive map of Oelde
- Location within Germany Location within North Rhine-Westphalia
- Coordinates: 51°50′N 8°9′E
- Country: Germany
- State: North Rhine-Westphalia
- Admin. region: Münster
- District: Warendorf
- Subdivisions: 5

Government
  - Mayor (2020–25): Karin Rodeheger (Ind.)

Area
  - Total: 102.77 km^{2} (39.68 sq mi)
- Elevation: 74–173 m (243–568 ft)

Population (2025-12-31)
  - Total: 29,961
  - Density: 291.53/km^{2} (755.07/sq mi)
- Time zone: UTC+01:00 (CET)
  - Summer (DST): UTC+02:00 (CEST)
- Postal codes: 59302
- Dialling codes: 02522, 02529, 02520, 05245
- Vehicle registration: WAF, BE
- Website: www.oelde.de

Oelde (German pronunciation: [ˈœldə]; Low German: Üle) is a town in the district of Warendorf, in North Rhine-Westphalia, Germany. It is located near Beckum.

== Geography ==
=== Division of the town ===
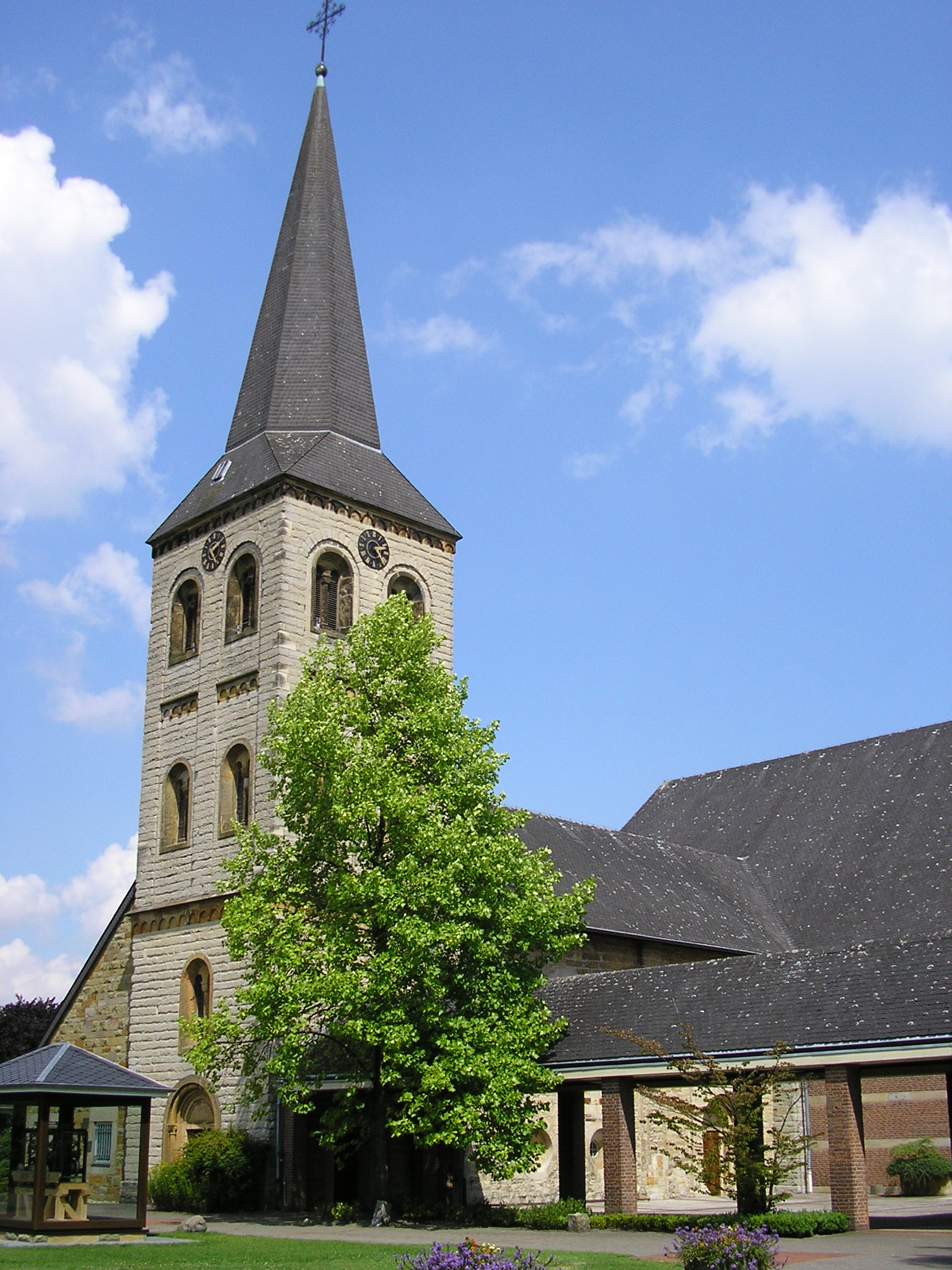
St. Vitus church in Oelde-Lette

Oelde consists of 5 districts:

- Oelde
- Stromberg
- Lette
- Sünninghausen
- Kirchspiel (with farming communities)
  - Keitlinghausen
  - Ahmenhorst
  - Menninghausen

=== Neighbouring places ===
The neighboring municipalities and cities are clockwise, starting in the north:

- Beelen
- Herzebrock-Clarholz
- Rheda-Wiedenbrück
- Langenberg
- Wadersloh
- Beckum
- Ennigerloh

== International relations ==
Oelde is (not officially) twinned with:

- Niesky (Saxony, Germany)
- Szigetszentmárton, Hungary

== History ==
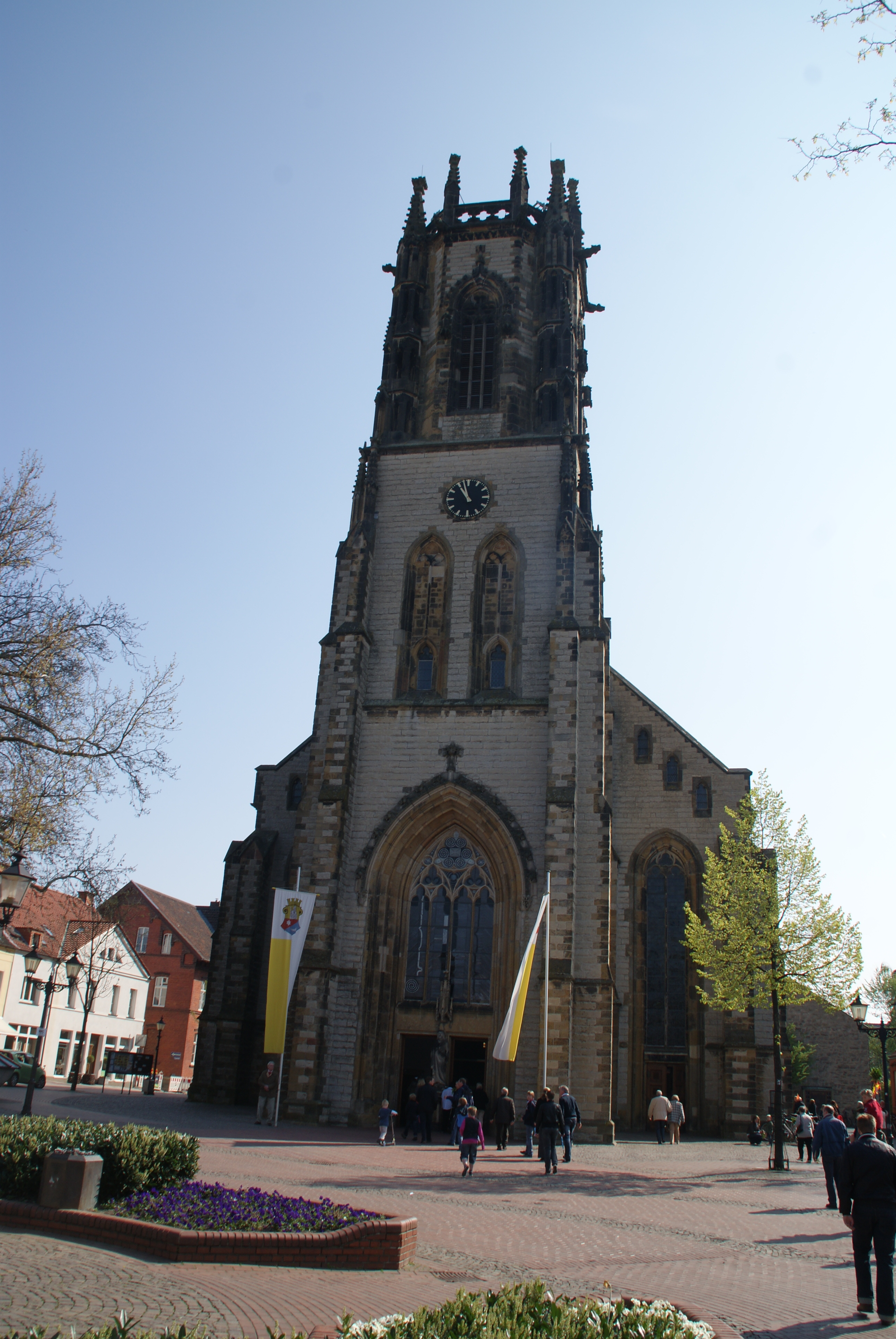
St. Johannes parish church in Oelde

The name Oelde was first mentioned in a document around 890 as "Ulithi im Dreingau" in the Urbar of the Werden monastery.

In 1457 a conflagration destroyed the city. In 1498, after the reconstruction, Oelde had 750 citizens. Another fire raged in 1605 and destroyed a total of 18 houses, barns and the town hall.

In 1939, Oelde was given its own exit when the motorway A 2 was built.

In the 1950s and 1960s, a high number of visitors came to Oelde when diplomats accepted the invitation of the Federal Presidents Heuss and Lübke to hunt small game in the state forest "Geisterholz". These events were commonly known as "diplomatic hunts."

In 2001 Oelde hosted one of the most important flower shows ever organized in Westphalia with more than 2.2 million visitors. Since then, the city garden, included in the exhibition grounds and embellished for the occasion, has been commercially exploited under the name "Park of the four seasons" (Vier-Jahreszeiten-Park).

== Population ==
Historical population

Year	Pop.	±% p.a.
1965	23,329	—
1970	25,537	+1.83%
1975	27,121	+1.21%
1980	27,582	+0.34%
1985	27,001	−0.42%
1990	27,759	+0.56%
1995	28,847	+0.77%

Year	Pop.	±% p.a.
2000	29,227	+0.26%
2005	29,393	+0.11%
2010	29,276	−0.08%
2015	29,299	+0.02%
2020	29,133	−0.11%
2025	29,961	+0.56%

Source: Landesdatabank Nordrhein-Westfalen

== Economy ==
Oelde is a centre of metal and lumber production, publishing, and also higher education through its nursing college. It is also home to the headquarters of GEA (Westfalia Separator), a manufacturer of centrifuges and dairy machines and the headquarters of Haver & Boecker, a manufacturer of wire weaving.

== Transport ==
=== Roads ===
Oelde is connected to the Bundesautobahn 2.

=== Railways ===
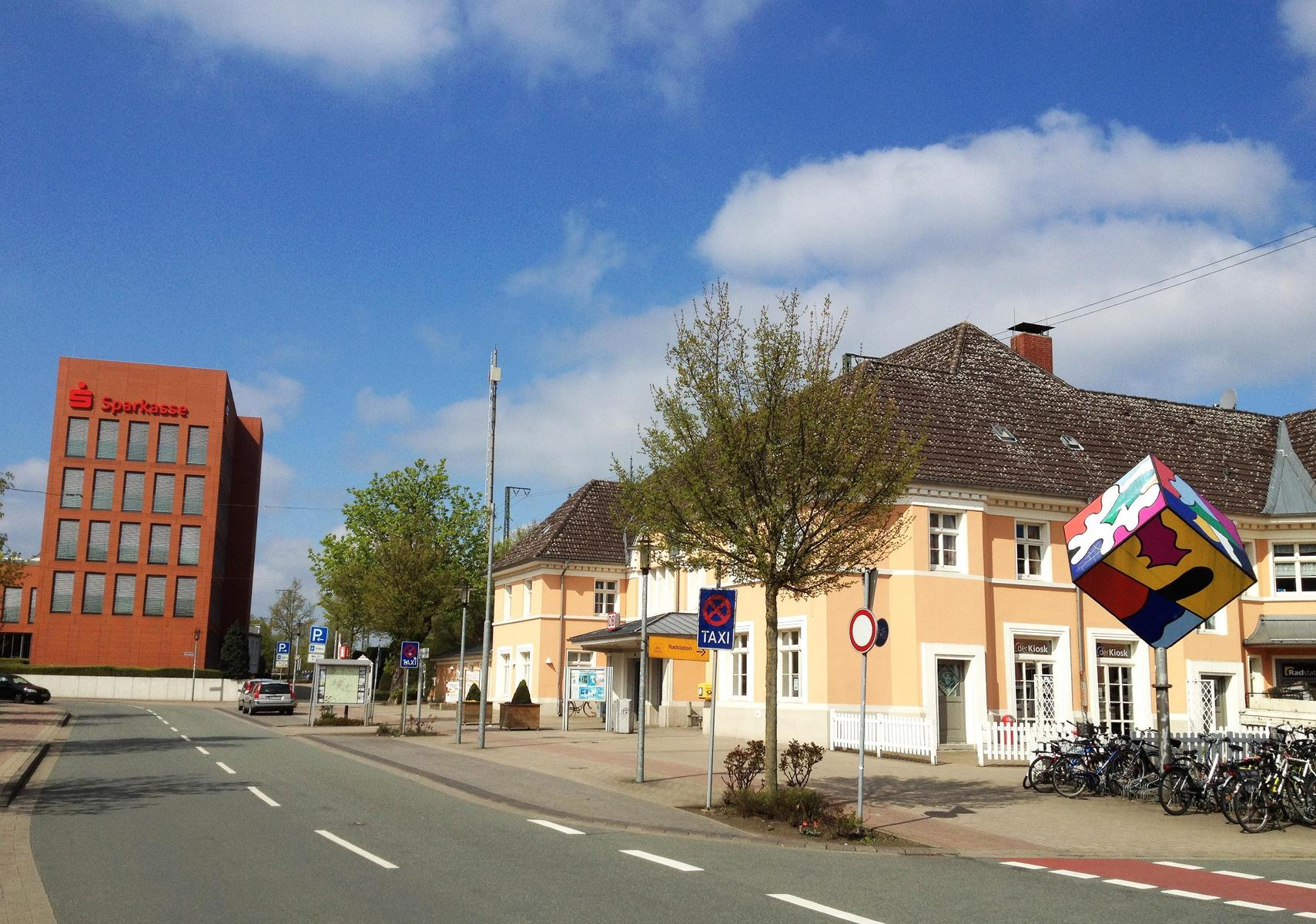
On the right: Oelde railway station

The Hamm–Minden railway connects Oelde station to the German rail network. The line is served by the Rhein-Weser-Express and the Ems-Börde-Bahn every hour.
