= GEA Refrigeration Technologies =

GEA Refrigeration Germany
- Type: Subsidiary GmbH
- Industry: Industrial refrigeration technology
- Founded: April 2010; 16 years ago
- Headquarters: Berlin, Germany
- Number of employees: About 3.000, worldwide
- Website: www.gea.com/en/heating-refrigeration/

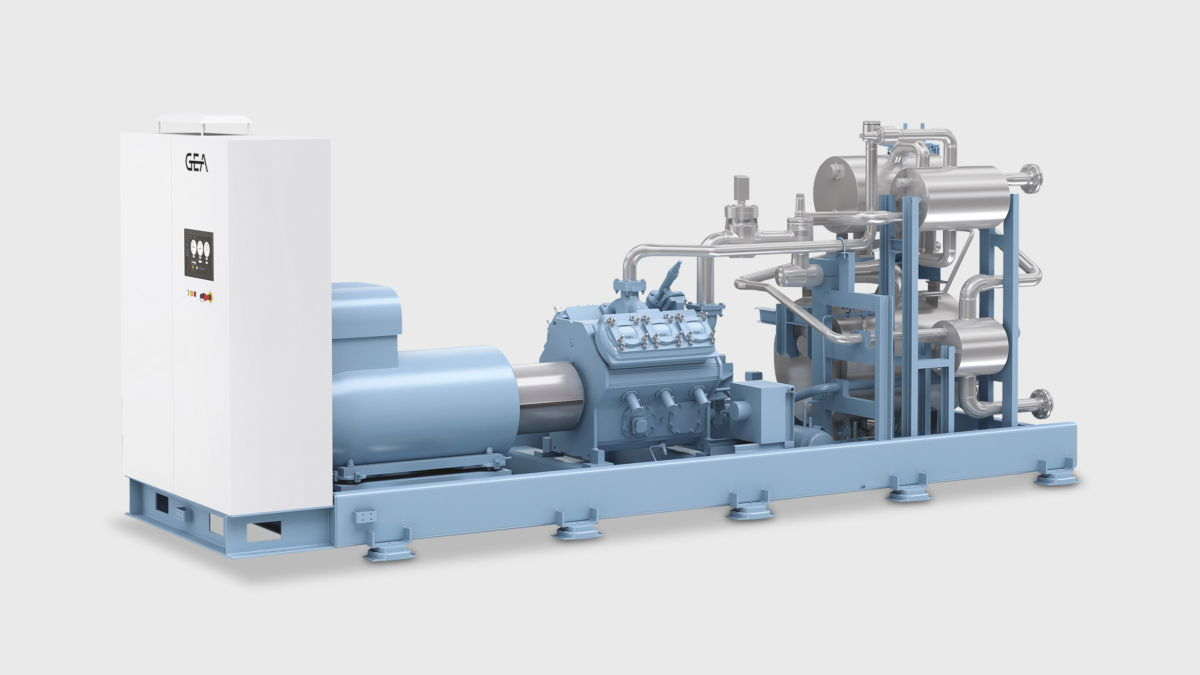
heat pump

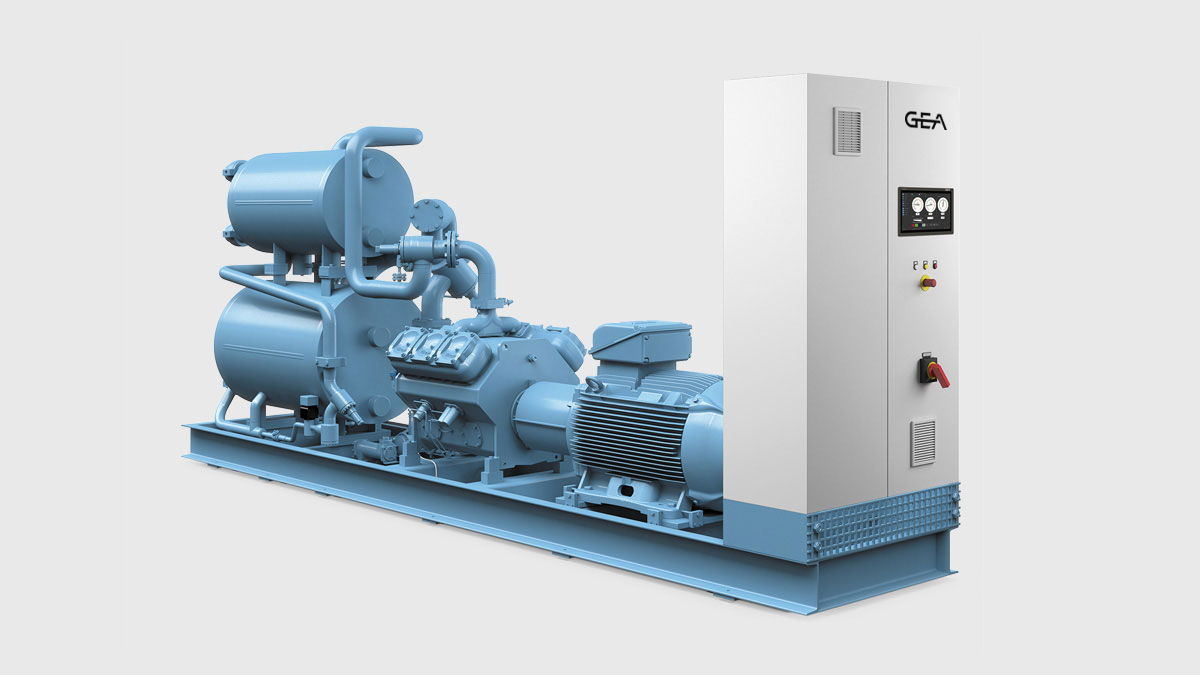
chiller

GEA Refrigeration Germany Is German developer, manufacturer and supplier of industrial heating & refrigeration technology and heat pumps headquartered in Berlin. The company has been a subsidiary of the GEA Group since 1991.

The GEA Refrigeration Germany GmbH manufactures products including reciprocating compressors, screw compressors, chillers, heat pumps, valves and dryers.

== History ==
The foundation for GEA Refrigeration Germany GmbH was laid by Willem Grasso in 1858 with his forge Willem Grasso Stoomsmederij in 's-Hertogenbosch, the Netherlands. There he initially manufactured steam engines and tools, and later steam hammers and butter churns. His son Henri took over the company in 1894.

The invention of margarine in 1896 gave the company a success boost and made it famous for its special margarine machines. In the same year, Grasso founded a separate division for refrigeration technology. The Second World War had taken its toll on the factory, so that Grasso had to cease production of margarine machines. After the war, Grasso concentrated on refrigeration technology.

The company has been part of the GEA Group since 1991. Step by step, it expanded its product range and services through several acquisitions: in 1993, GEA Refrigeration Germany GmbH acquired GEA Grenco, a Dutch manufacturer of refrigeration technology for the food and shipping industries, and one year later the compressor specialist Kühlautomat Berlin GmbH (KAB, formerly VEB Kühlautomat Berlin).

In the following years until the GEA Group's reorganization in January 2009, the company acquired the current specialist for industrial refrigeration technology FES, Inc. (now GEA FES, Inc.), USA; Morris & Young Ltd, London, UK; the German valve manufacturer AWP (now GEA AWP GmbH).

Furthermore, since 2009, Eurotek (now Eurotek Engineering Ltd), UK, and Intec (now GEA Intec) have been part of the GEA Group.

== Brands ==
- GEA AWP
- GEA Grasso
- GEA FES
