= E. Donald Sterner =

American politician (1894–1983)

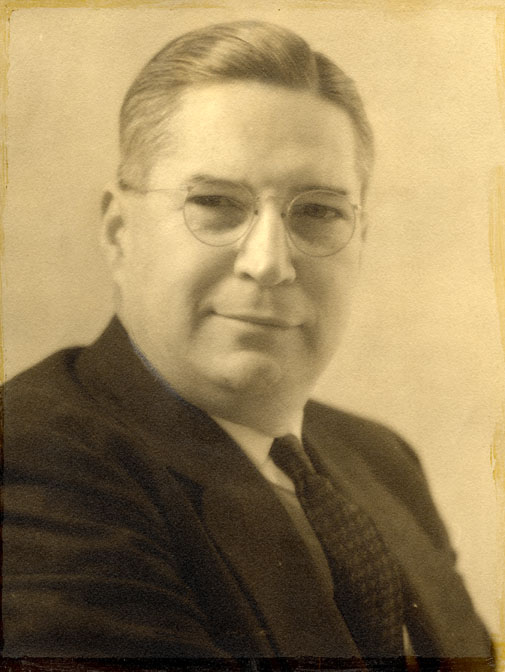
- Sterner circa 1935

1st New Jersey Highway Commissioner
- In office 1935–1942
- Appointed by: Harold Giles Hoffman

Chairman of the New Jersey Republican State Committee
- In office 1934–1935
- Preceded by: E. Bertram Mott
- Succeeded by: Henry W. Jeffers

Personal details
- Born: Edwin Donald Sterner; January 3, 1894 Belmar, New Jersey, U.S.
- Died: September 30, 1983 (aged 89) Jersey Shore Medical Center; Neptune City, New Jersey, U.S.
- Education: Asbury Park High School

Edwin Donald Sterner (January 3, 1894 – September 30, 1983) was an American lumberman and Republican Party politician who served in both houses of the New Jersey Legislature and as chairman of the New Jersey Republican State Committee. He was also the first New Jersey Highway Commissioner.

== Biography ==
Sterner was born in Belmar, New Jersey, on January 3, 1894, to Willard J. Sterner and Jennie L. Disbrow.

After graduating from Asbury Park High School in 1912, he worked for the Lewis Lumber Company in Asbury Park where his father was the manager. He then served in the United States Army during World War I. He attended officers' training camps in Plattsburgh and Fort Niagara, New York, and was commissioned Second Lieutenant in 1917, later promoted to First Lieutenant before being sent overseas in 1918. He was salvage officer with the 2nd Infantry Division and was engaged in the Second Battle of the Marne, the Battle of Saint-Mihiel and the Meuse-Argonne Offensive.

After the war he returned to Belmar and managed the Sterner Coal and Lumber Company, founded by his father in 1919.

He married Dorothy and had as their children: two sons, George W. Sterner, of Wall Township, New Jersey; and John N. Sterner of Spring Lake Heights; a daughter, Dorothy Sterner Braly of Baltimore, Maryland.

He became active in local Republican politics and was elected to the New Jersey General Assembly in 1927 and to the New Jersey Senate in 1929, representing Monmouth County. In 1934 he was selected as chairman of the New Jersey Republican State Committee by Harold G. Hoffman, then the Republican candidate for Governor of New Jersey. When Hoffman was elected to office, Sterner was also named the governor's secretary.

In 1935 the New Jersey Legislature passed a bill replacing the four-member Highway Commission with a single commissioner. Hoffman appointed Sterner to the new post. He served for seven years, continuing under Hoffman's Democratic successors, A. Harry Moore and Charles Edison. Edison launched an investigation of corruption in the Highway Department, and Sterner resigned in 1942. When the full report of the investigation was released the following year, it found malfeasance in some cases of land acquisition for right-of-way purposes, where property owners represented by influential politicians were given sweetheart deals.

Sterner continued to serve as president of the Sterner Coal and Lumber Company in Belmar. He later served as president of the New Jersey Lumbermen's Association and in 1950 was appointed to the National Lumber and Allied Products Retailers Industry Advisory Committee to the United States Department of Commerce.

A resident of Avon-by-the-Sea, he died on September 30, 1983, at the Jersey Shore Medical Center in Neptune City at the age of 89.

Party political offices
Preceded by E. Bertram Mott	Chairman of the New Jersey Republican State Committee; 1934–1935	Succeeded by Henry W. Jeffers
