= E. Bertram Mott =

American lawyer

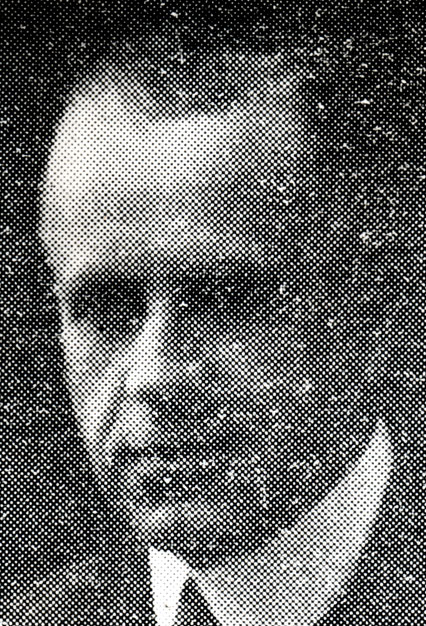
- Elias Bertram Mott circa 1918

9th Chair of the New Jersey Republican State Committee
- In office 1927–1934
- Preceded by: Edward C. Stokes
- Succeeded by: E. Donald Sterner

Member of the New Jersey Republican State Committee
- In office 1922–1934

Morris County Clerk
- In office 1908 – September 23, 1961

Personal details
- Born: Elias Bertram Mott; March 11, 1879 Rockaway Township, New Jersey, US
- Died: September 23, 1961 (aged 82) Morristown Memorial Hospital; Morristown, New Jersey, US
- Party: Republican
- Education: Wyoming Seminary

Elias Bertram Mott (March 11, 1879 – September 23, 1961) was an American Republican Party politician who served as chairman of the New Jersey Republican State Committee and as county clerk of Morris County, New Jersey for more than 50 years.

== Biography ==
Mott was born in 1879 in Rockaway Township, New Jersey, to Elias Briant and Lauretta W. Mott. He attended public schools in Rockaway Township, before going on to Wyoming Seminary in Kingston, Pennsylvania, where he graduated in 1896. He studied law privately and was admitted to the New Jersey Bar in 1901.

In 1897 Mott first worked as an aide to his father, Elias B. Mott, who was Morris County Clerk at the time. He was appointed deputy county clerk the following year, and would be elected as county clerk in 1908, a position he would hold until his death in 1961.

In 1922 he was elected a member of the New Jersey Republican State Committee. He became chairman of the State Committee in 1927, succeeding former Governor of New Jersey Edward C. Stokes, who resigned to run for United States Senate. He served in the position for seven years.

Mott died in 1961 at Morristown Memorial Hospital at the age of 82.

Party political offices
Preceded by Edward C. Stokes	Chairman of the New Jersey Republican State Committee; 1927–1934	Succeeded by E. Donald Sterner
