= GEA Westfalia Separator =

German manufacturer of separators and decanters

GEA Westfalia Separator Group GmbH
- Industry: Machine Construction / Engineering
- Founded: September 1893
- Headquarters: Oelde, Germany
- Products: Separators & Decanters
- Number of employees: approx. 3.000
- Website: GEA Westfalia Separator Group GmbH

GEA Westfalia Separator Group GmbH with head office in Oelde, Westfalia is a German manufacturer of separators and decanters which is part of the GEA Group. The company develops procedures and processes for the mechanical clarification and separation of liquids for the food industry, chemicals, pharmaceuticals, biotechnology, energy, shipping and environmental technology.

== History ==
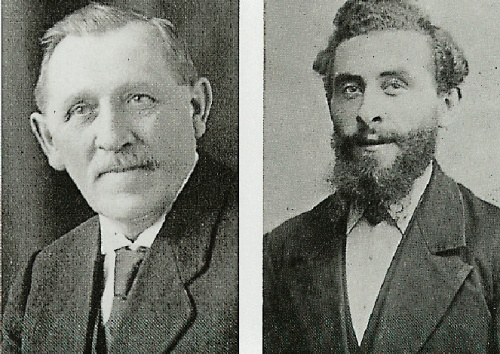
The founders Franz Ramesohl and Franz Schmidt

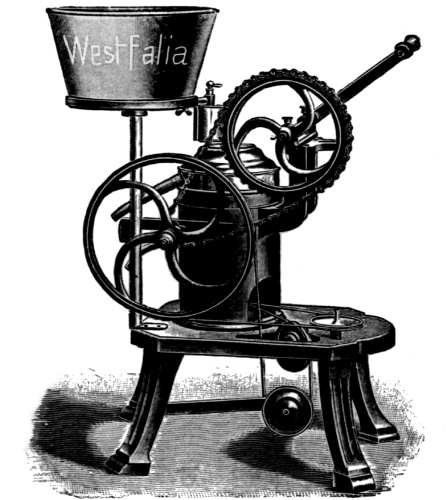
The first milk centrifuge from Ramesohl & Schmidt oHG

1893–1900
On 1. September 1893 the brothers-in-law Franz Ramesohl and Franz Schmidt opened up a workshop under the name of Ramesohl & Schmidt oHG in Oelde. With a staff comprising two lathe operators and three mechanics, they started the production of milk separators which cost between 200 and 320 marks. In the year following the company foundation, the number of employees rose to 20 and the production facilities were expanded by a further building. In 1897 annual production was 2000 centrifuges, with 60 employees.

The company was transformed into an Aktiengesellschaft in 1899 based on a shareholders’ agreement. The share capital was 1,000 shares worth 1,000 marks each. The turnover amounted to 501068 Deutsche Mark. In 1900 around 10,000 milk centrifuges from Ramesohl & Schmidt AG were in service.

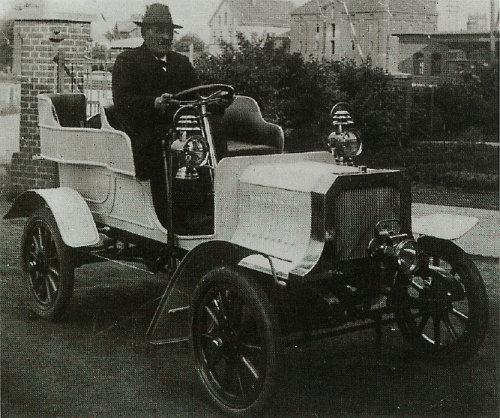
Test run of a Westfalia motor vehicle with Franz Ramesohl

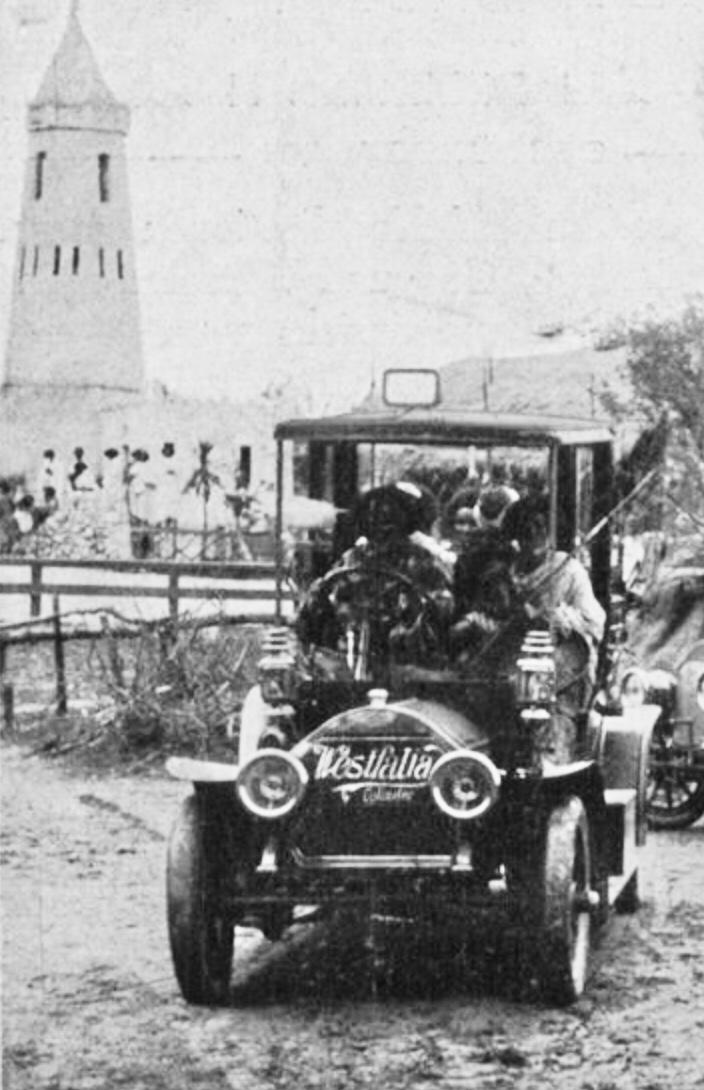
Westfalia (1910)

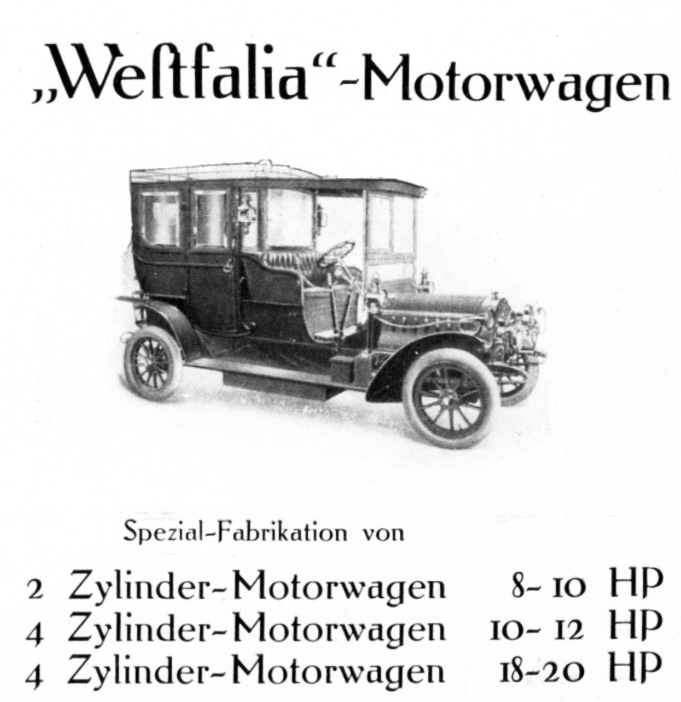
Westfalia advertisement (1910)

1901–1910
The production of motorbikes was launched for a brief period in 1901 which, however, was discontinued in the same year. in 1906 the company, with a workforce meanwhile totalling 110 employees, started to manufacture automobiles. In 1907 the first separator for the separation of mineral oil-water mixtures was launched.

1911–1920
Despite the initial promising figures, the fierce completion forced the company to cease the production of Westfalia motor vehicles in 1913. In 1915 Werner Habig was appointed director and member of the board. In the same year, the board members Richard Riefenberg, August Strothmann and founding member Franz Ramesohl resigned from office and Werner Habig joined the company. He managed Westfalia Separator until 1971.

1921–1930
In 1926 the production line was expanded to include bucket milking installations. The first mobile milking installation for pasture land operation was presented to the public in 1927 at the agricultural show in Dortmund. The company founded Westfalia Separator Inc. in 1929, the first company in the USA.

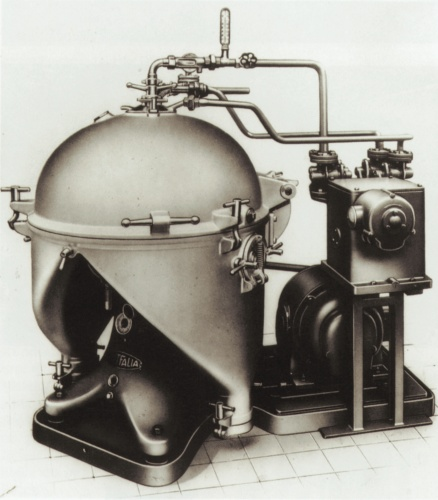
The first self-cleaning separator

1931–1940

In 1931 the company presented the first self-cleaning separator. Co-founder Franz Schmidt died on 18 March 1937. In 1940 the turnover surpassed the 10 million ℛ︁ℳ︁ limit for the first time.

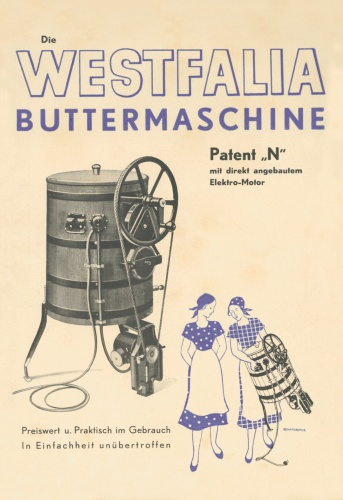
Poster for a Westfalia buttermaking machine

1941–1950

Ramesohl & Schmidt AG was renamed Westfalia Separator AG on 29 September 1941. In the same year, Westfalia Separator built the first continuously operating buttermaking machine. In the war years production came to a virtual standstill and the turnover bottomed out at the end of the war generating a turnover of just 2.5 million RM. Reconstruction began in 1946 and, insofar as materials could be procured, a wide range of own constructions were designed and manufactured such as spin dryers, circular saws, lamps, sledges, candleholders, scooters, coat racks, toys and Braille typewriters.

1950–1960
In the following years, separators as well as milking and feeding installations were developed and manufactured. Westfalia Separator advanced to become the market leader in Germany. In 1954, the company was already exporting its products to 70 countries. The first decanter was constructed in 1955.

1961–1970
In 1962 the Niederahr plant was put on stream after a construction period of just one year. The Château-Thierry branch in France followed in 1963. In 1965 the production of hand-operated separators was discontinued. In 1966 the staff magazine, Die Trommel, was published for the first time, and has been printed six times a year ever since. In 1967 the turnover of Westfalia Separator exceeded the 100 million mark for the first time, whereby most of the turnover was generated by exports. In 1968 the product line already comprised 70 different separator models in 350 different designs.

1971–1980
In 1971 Werner Habig requested the supervisory board to relieve him of his duties as director; his successor was Otto Müller-Habig. Werner Habig became chairman of the supervisory board, replacing his brother Leo Habig. In 1973 the turnover topped the 200 million DM limit; the export share climbed to 59 percent.

1981–1990
In 1987 the company was split up into the business areas Westfalia Separator Landtechnik and Westfalia Separator Trenntechnik to increase transparency and delimit responsibilities in a more clearly defined way. In 1988, the company incorporated the dairy farm program of Miele Melktechnik as a second product line in the dairy farm segment. Westfalia Separator achieved the highest turnover to date of 530 million DM in 1989. The number of employees surpassed 3000 for the first time. At this time, 23 subsidiaries had been set up abroad. Up to the year 1990, the company had been granted 450 patents, of which 210 were independent inventions. More than 1000 patents had been filed internationally by 1990.

1990–2000
Since 1994 Westfalia Separator has been a member of the GEA Group, Bochum. The dairy farming sector was spun off in 1996 to become an independent company trading under the name GEA Farm Technologies.

2000–present
In 2004, the Westfalia Separator e.V. association was founded to offer unbureaucratic help for employees in distress as well as to help fund social projects in Oelde. The authorized workshop was founded in 2007 in Tianjim to be able to serve the Chinese market even more effectively. On 13. February 2008 the corporate form of Westfalia Separator AG was changed. The company trades henceforth under the name of GEA Westfalia Separator GmbH.

Since 1 January 2010 GEA Westfalia Separator Group has been part of the GEA Group Segment GEA Mechanical Equipment.

== Production locations ==
- Oelde (DE)
- Niederahr (DE)
- Château-Thierry (FR)
- Bengaluru (IN)
- Wuqing (CN)

== Literature ==
- Manfred Kersten: Innovation from Tradition – 115 Years Westfalia Separator AG Oelde
