= Clayton E. Freeman =

American businessman and politician

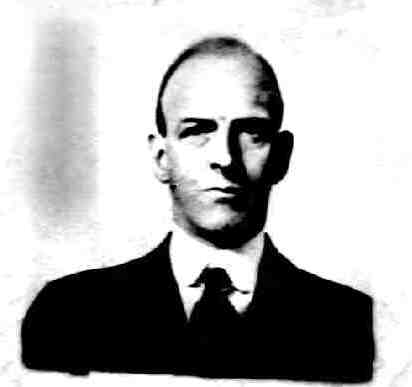

Chairman of the New Jersey Republican State Committee
- In office 1937–1941
- Preceded by: Henry W. Jeffers
- Succeeded by: H. Alexander Smith

Personal details
- Born: Clayton Eugene Freeman; October 26, 1872 Essex Junction, Vermont, U.S.
- Died: August 31, 1959 (aged 86) Glen Ridge, New Jersey, U.S.
- Party: Republican
- Education: Adams Academy
- Profession: Politician, businessman

Clayton Eugene Freeman (October 26, 1872 – August 31, 1959) was an American businessman and Republican Party politician who served as chairman of the New Jersey Republican State Committee.

== Biography ==
Freeman was born in Essex Junction, Vermont, on October 26, 1872.

He moved to Massachusetts at the age of 17. He graduated from Adams Academy and spent 20 years in the jewelry business in Boston. He assisted in organizing the W. T. Grant chain of stores, eventually serving as the company's president.

Freeman moved to New Jersey to organize the W. T. Grant chain there. He also served as a director of the Newark-based L. Bamberger & Company. He settled in Glen Ridge, where he became involved in the Essex County Republican organization, serving as the chairman of the county's Board of Chosen Freeholders.

Freeman served on the financial committee of the New Jersey Republican State Committee, and in 1937 he was selected by Lester H. Clee, Republican candidate for Governor of New Jersey that year, to be chairman of the State Committee. He declined a second term in the party chairmanship and was replaced by Howard Alexander Smith.

He died at his home in Glen Ridge, New Jersey, in 1959 at the age of 87.

Party political offices
Preceded by Henry W. Jeffers	Chairman of the New Jersey Republican State Committee; 1937–1941	Succeeded by Howard Alexander Smith
