= Milking =

Extracting milk from a mammal

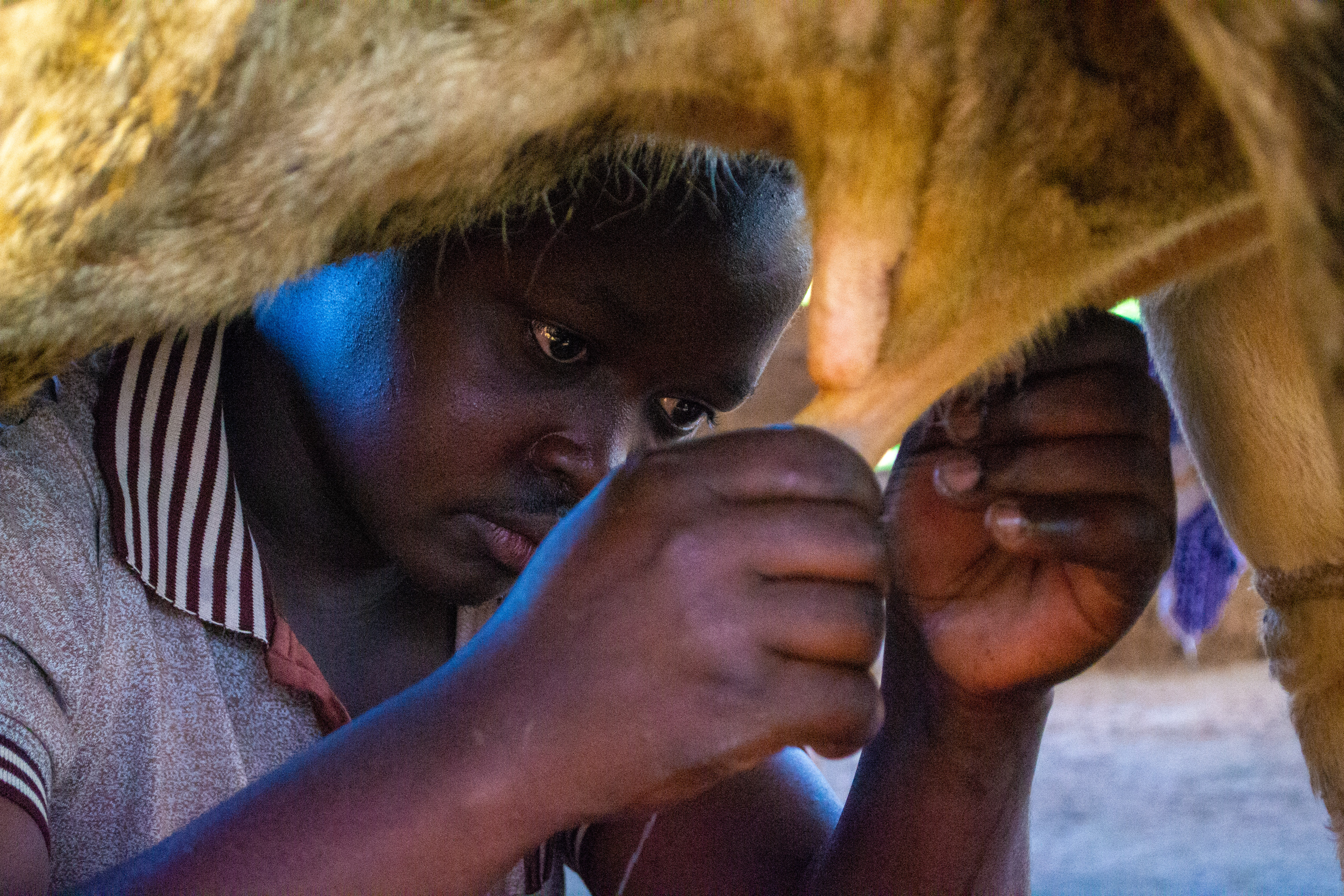
A boy hand milks a cow on a farm in Nigeria

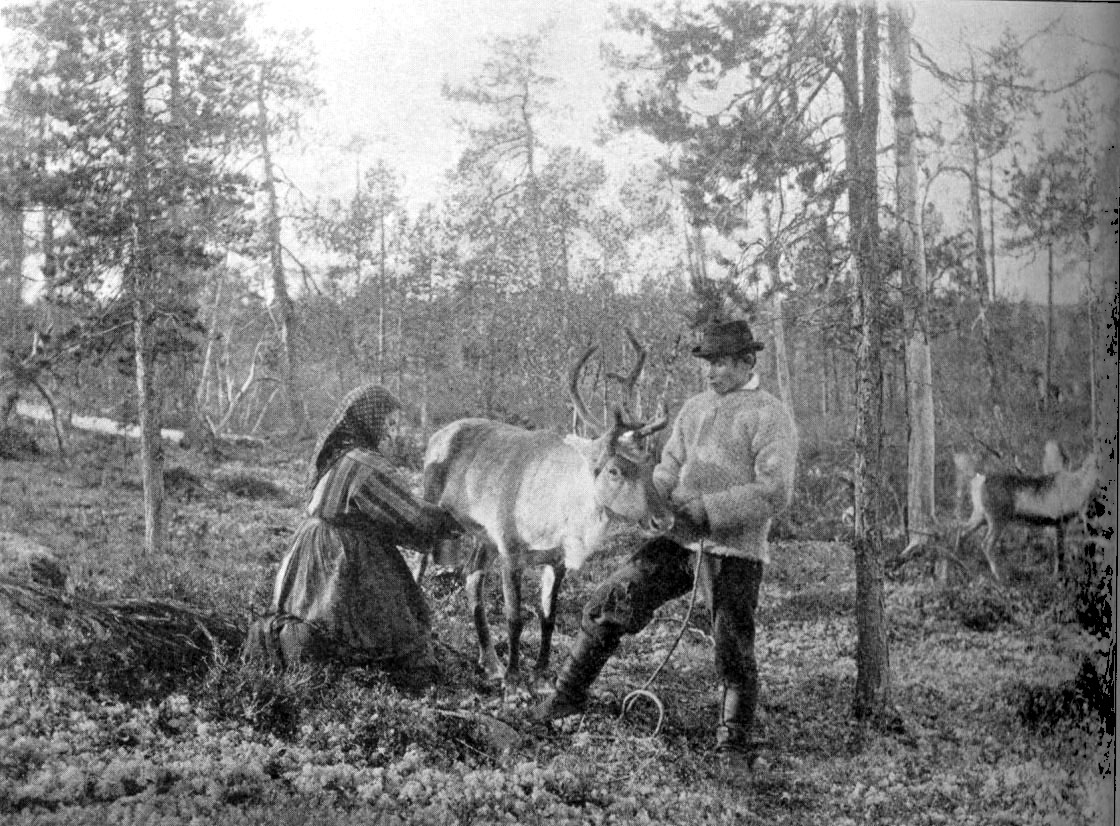
Reindeer milking (19th century)

Milking is the act of removing milk from the mammary glands of cattle, water buffalo, humans, goats, sheep, and, more rarely, camels, horses, and donkeys. Milking may be done by hand or by machine, and requires the animal to be currently or recently pregnant. The milker may refer either to the animal that produces the milk or the person who milks said animal.

== Hand milking ==
Hand milking is the process of manually squeezing milk from an animal's teats, typically done with two hands to express milk into a bucket. It involves first cleaning the udder and teats, then gripping the base of a teat with your thumb and forefinger to trap milk, and finally squeezing downward with your other fingers to push the milk out.

== Machine milking ==
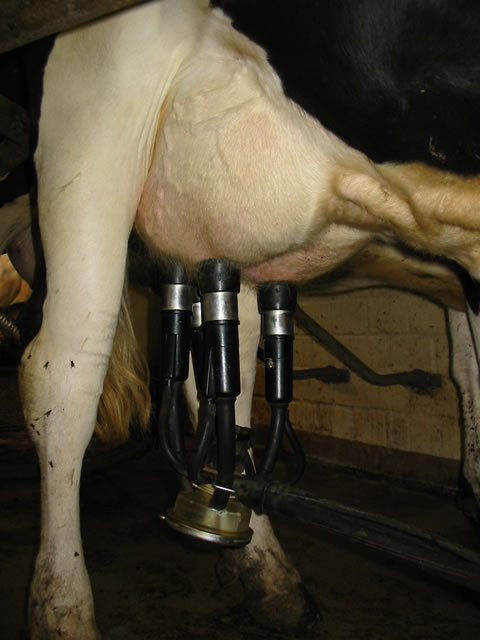
Small-scale machine milking

Most milking in the developed world is done using milking machines. Teat cups are attached to the cow's teats, and then the cups alternate between vacuum and normal air pressure to extract the milk. The milk is filtered and cooled before being added to a large bulk tank of milk for storage.

The average time of milking is 5–7 minutes and a cow can be milked with a machine 2–3 times a day.

The existing robotic milking has allowed cows to have the freedom to decide when to milk, but still needs to make contact with people.

A known side effect of machine milking is mastitis in cows. Non-sterile machines can introduce bacteria into the teat and cause infection. Another side effect is physical teat damage by the machine.

== Venom milking ==
The word "milking" is also used by extension to describe the removal of venom from snakes and spiders for the production of antivenom.

Spider venom milking can be done either by manual stimulation or with electrical stimulation. The former causes greater trauma to the spider and the latter produces venom of high quality.

== See also ==
- Breast pump
- Milking the system
