= Automatic milking =

Milking of dairy animals without human labour

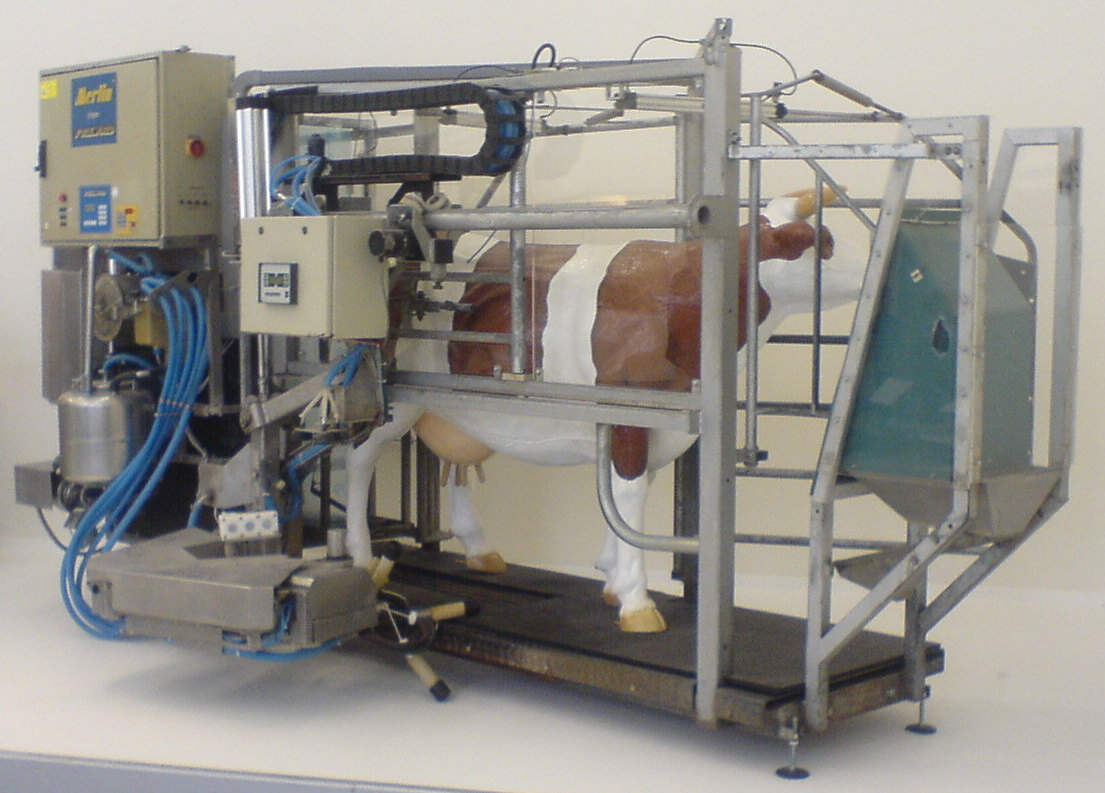
A Fullwood Merlin AMS unit from the 1990s, exhibit at the Deutsches Museum in Germany

Automatic milking is the milking of dairy animals, especially of dairy cattle, without human labour. Automatic milking systems (AMS), also called voluntary milking systems (VMS), were developed in the late 20th century. They have been commercially available since the early 1990s. The core of such systems that allows complete automation of the milking process is a type of agricultural robot. Automated milking is therefore also called robotic milking. Common systems rely on the use of computers and special herd management software. They can also be used to monitor the health status of cows.

== Automated milking ==
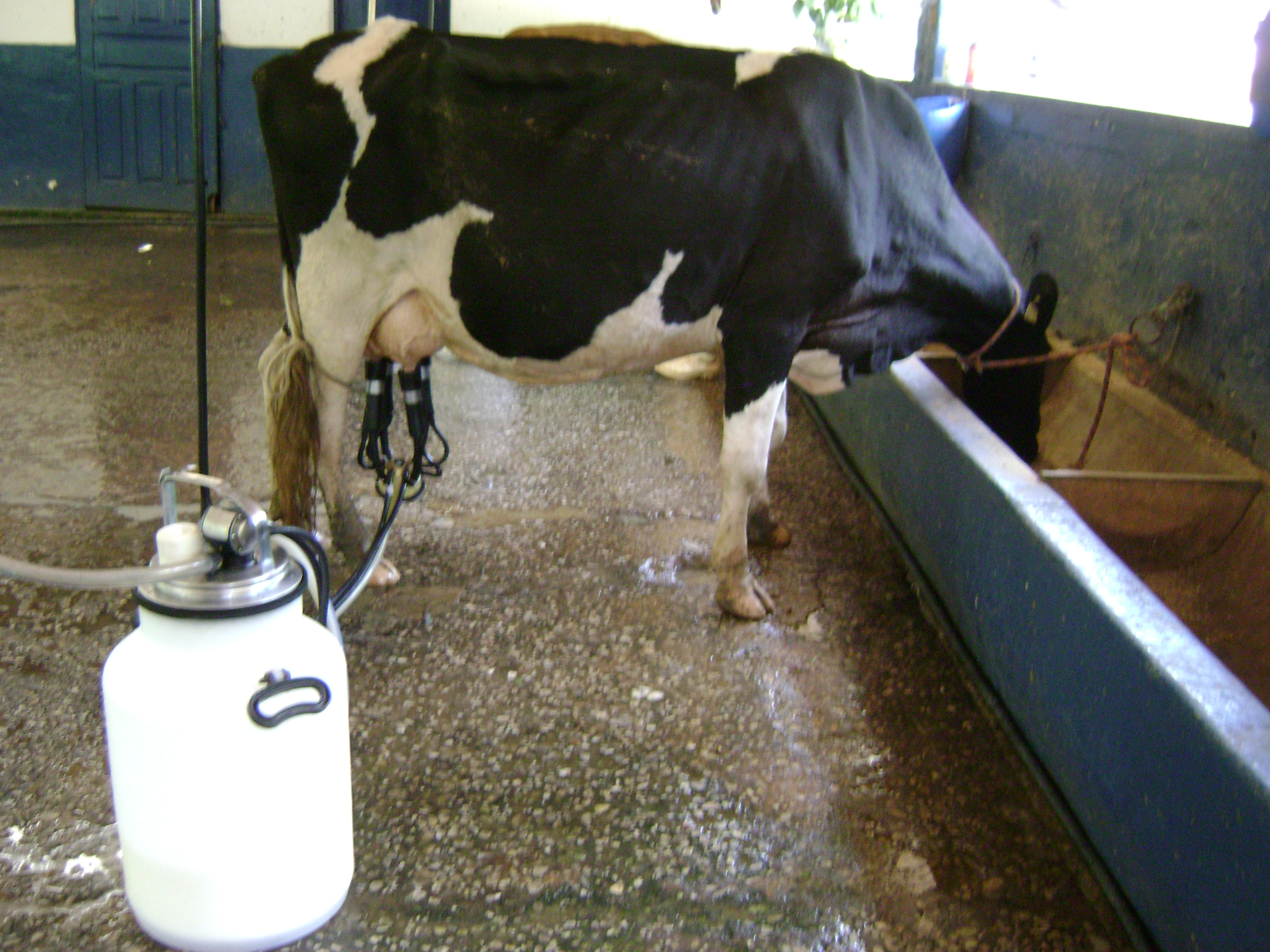
A cow and a milking machine – partial automation compared to hand milking

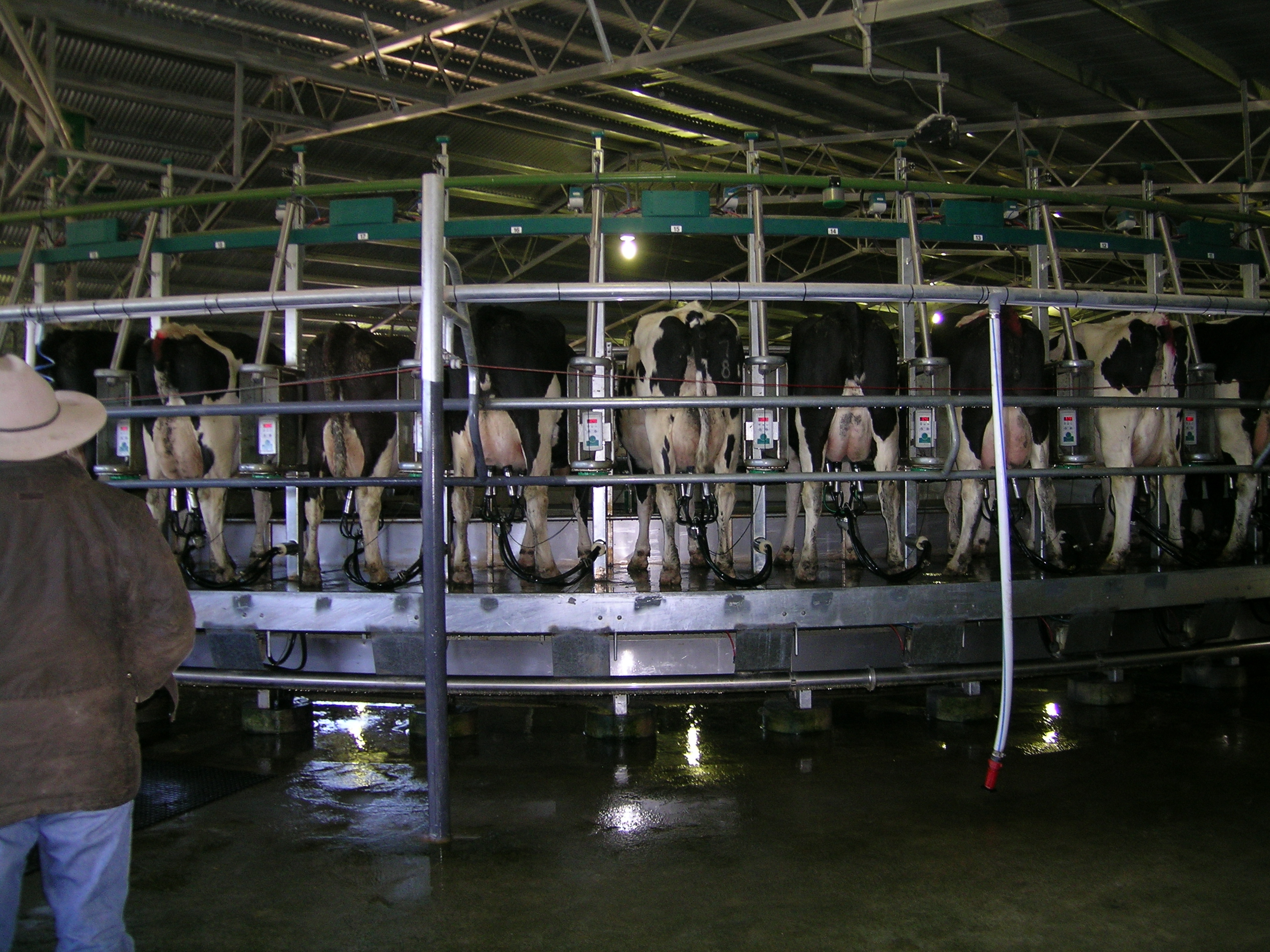
A rotary milking parlor – higher efficiency compared to stationary milking parlors, but still requiring manual labour with milking machines etc.

=== Basics – milking process and milking schedules ===
The milking process is the collection of tasks specifically devoted to extracting milk from an animal (rather than the broader field of dairy animal husbandry). This process may be broken down into several sub-tasks: collecting animals before milking, routing animals into the parlour, inspection and cleaning of teats, attachment of milking equipment to teats, and often massaging the back of the udder to relieve any held back milk, extraction of milk, removal of milking equipment, and routing of animals out of the parlour.

Maintaining milk yield during the lactation period (approximately 300 days) requires consistent milking intervals, usually twice daily and with maximum time spacing between milkings. In fact, all activities on the dairy farm must be scheduled around the milking process. Such a milking routine imposes restrictions on the time management and personal life of an individual farmer, as the farmer is committed to milking in the early morning and in the evening for seven days a week, regardless of personal health, family responsibilities or social schedule. This time restriction is exacerbated for lone farmers and farm families if extra labour cannot easily or economically be obtained, and is a factor in the decline in small-scale dairy farming. Techniques such as once-a-day milking and voluntary milking (see below) have been investigated to reduce these time constraints.

=== Automation progress in the 20th century ===
To alleviate the labour involved in milking, much of the milking process has been automated during the 20th century: many farmers use semi-automatic or automatic cow traffic control (powered gates, etc.), the milking machine (a basic form was developed in the late 19th century) has entirely automated milk extraction, and automatic cluster removal is available to remove milking equipment after milking. Automatic teat spraying systems are available, however, there is some debate over the cleaning effectiveness of these.

Machine milking works by using vacuum pressure to extract milk from cows. Specialized machines apply a steady vacuum to the cow's teat, gently sucking out the milk and transferring it to a container. Additionally, these machines periodically apply external pressure to the entire teat, which helps maintain proper blood circulation.

The final manual labour tasks remaining in the milking process were cleaning and inspection of teats and attachment of milking equipment (milking cups) to teats. Automatic cleaning and attachment of milking cups is a complex task, requiring accurate detection of teat position and a dexterous mechanical manipulator. These tasks have been automated successfully in the voluntary milking system (VMS), or automatic milking system (AMS).

== Automatic milking systems (AMS) ==
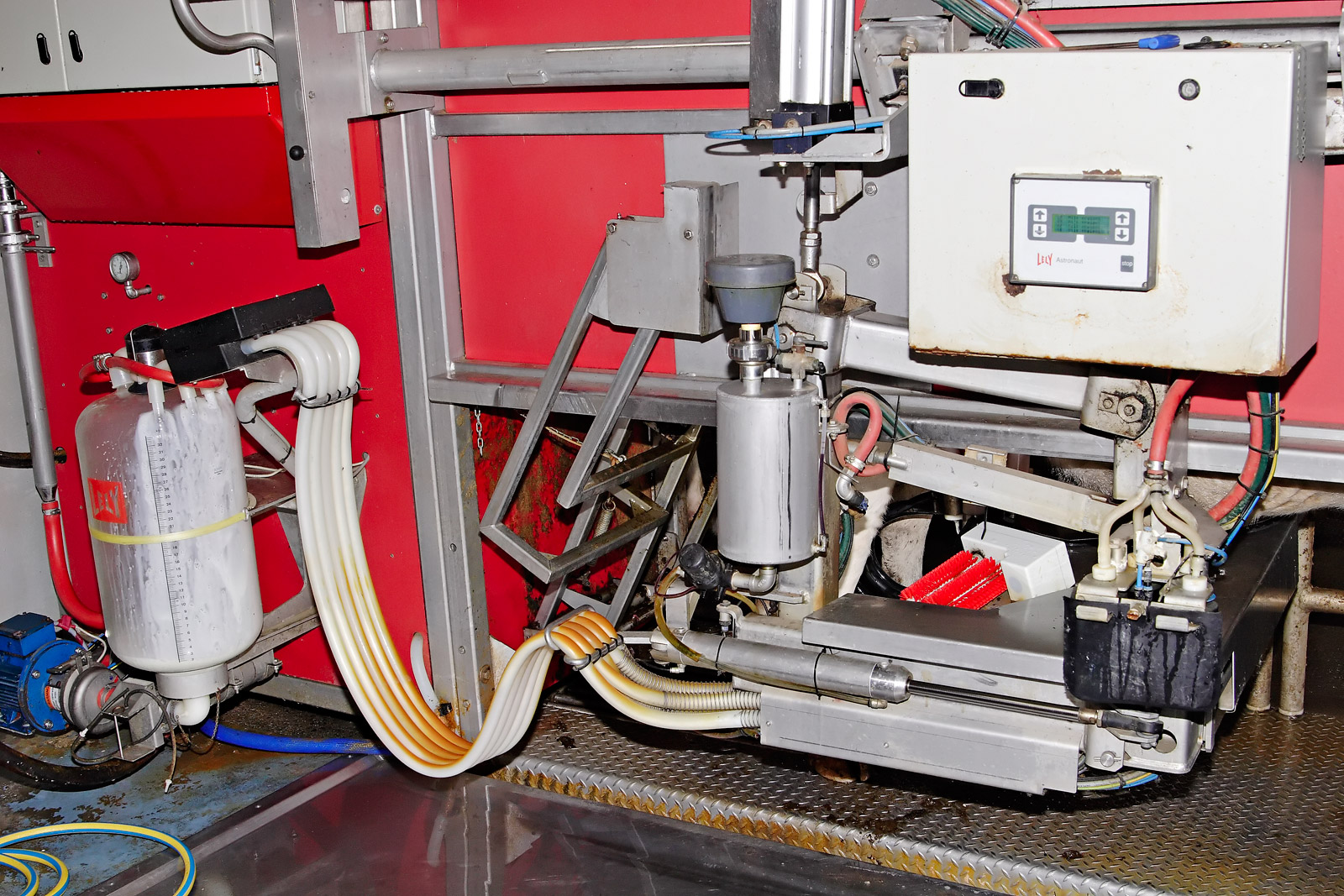
An older Lely Astronaut AMS unit at work (milking)

Since the 1970s, much research effort has been expended in investigating methods to alleviate time management constraints in conventional dairy farming, culminating in the development of the automated voluntary milking system. There is a video of the historical development of the milking robot at Silsoe Research Institute.

Voluntary milking allows the cow to decide her own milking time and interval, rather than being milked as part of a group at set milking times. AMS requires complete automation of the milking process as the cow may elect to be milked at any time.

The milking unit comprises a milking machine, a teat position sensor (usually a laser), a robotic arm for automatic teat-cup application and removal, and a gate system for controlling cow traffic. The cows may be permanently housed in a barn, and spend most of their time resting or feeding in the free-stall area. If cows are to be grazed as well, using a selection gate to allow only those cows that have been milked to the outside pastures has been advised by some AMS manufacturers.

When the cow elects to enter the milking unit (due to highly palatable feed that she finds in the milking box), a cow ID sensor reads an identification tag (transponder) on the cow and passes the cow ID to the control system. If the cow has been milked too recently, the automatic gate system sends the cow out of the unit. If the cow may be milked, automatic teat cleaning, milking cup application, milking, and teatspraying takes place. As an incentive to attend the milking unit, concentrated feedstuffs needs to be fed to the cow in the milking unit.

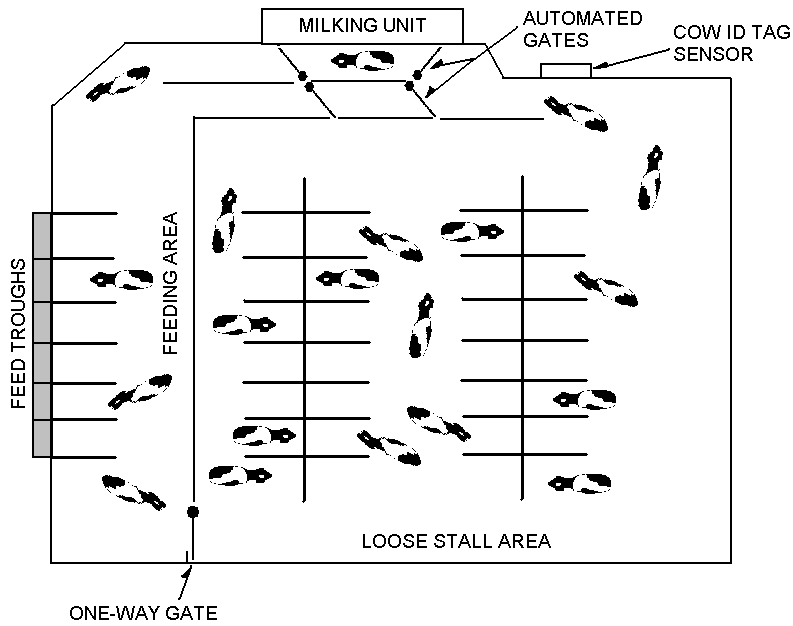
Typical VMS stall layout (forced cow traffic layout)

The barn may be arranged such that access to the main feeding area can only be obtained by passing the milking unit. This layout is referred to as guided cow traffic. Alternatively, the barn may be set up such that the cow always has access to feed, water, and a comfortable place to lie down, and is only motivated to visit the milking system by the palatable feed available there. This is referred to as free cow traffic.

The innovative core of the AMS system is the robotic manipulator in the milking unit. This robotic arm automates the tasks of teat cleaning and milking attachment and removes the final elements of manual labour from the milking process. Careful design of the robot arm and associated sensors and controls allows robust unsupervised performance, such that the farmer is only required to attend the cows for condition inspection and when a cow has not attended for milking.

Typical capacity for an AMS is 50–70 cows per milking unit. AMS usually achieve milking frequencies between 2 and 3 times per day, so a single milking unit handling 60 cows and milking each cow 3 times per day has a capacity of 7.5 cows per hour. This low capacity is convenient for lower-cost design of the robot arm and associated control system, as a window of several minutes is available for each cow and high-speed operation is not required.

AMS units have been available commercially since the early 1990s, and have proved relatively successful in implementing the voluntary milking method. Much of the research and development has taken place in the Netherlands. The most farms with AMS are located in the Netherlands, and Denmark.

A new variation on the theme of robotic milking includes a similar robotic arm system, but coupled with a rotary platform, improving the number of cows that can be handled per robot arm. A mobile variation of robotic milking, adapted to tie-stall configuration (stanchion barns), is used in Canada. In this configuration, the AMS travels in the centre isle of the barn approaching cows from behind to milk them in their stalls.

A portable milking machine is an AMS on wheels. Portable milking machines have gained popularity with their low cost of installation and ability to take them close to animals who cannot be taken to the barn to milk. However they are reliant on manual labour to do the milking and may not be suitable as the only method of milking in large farms.

=== Advantages ===
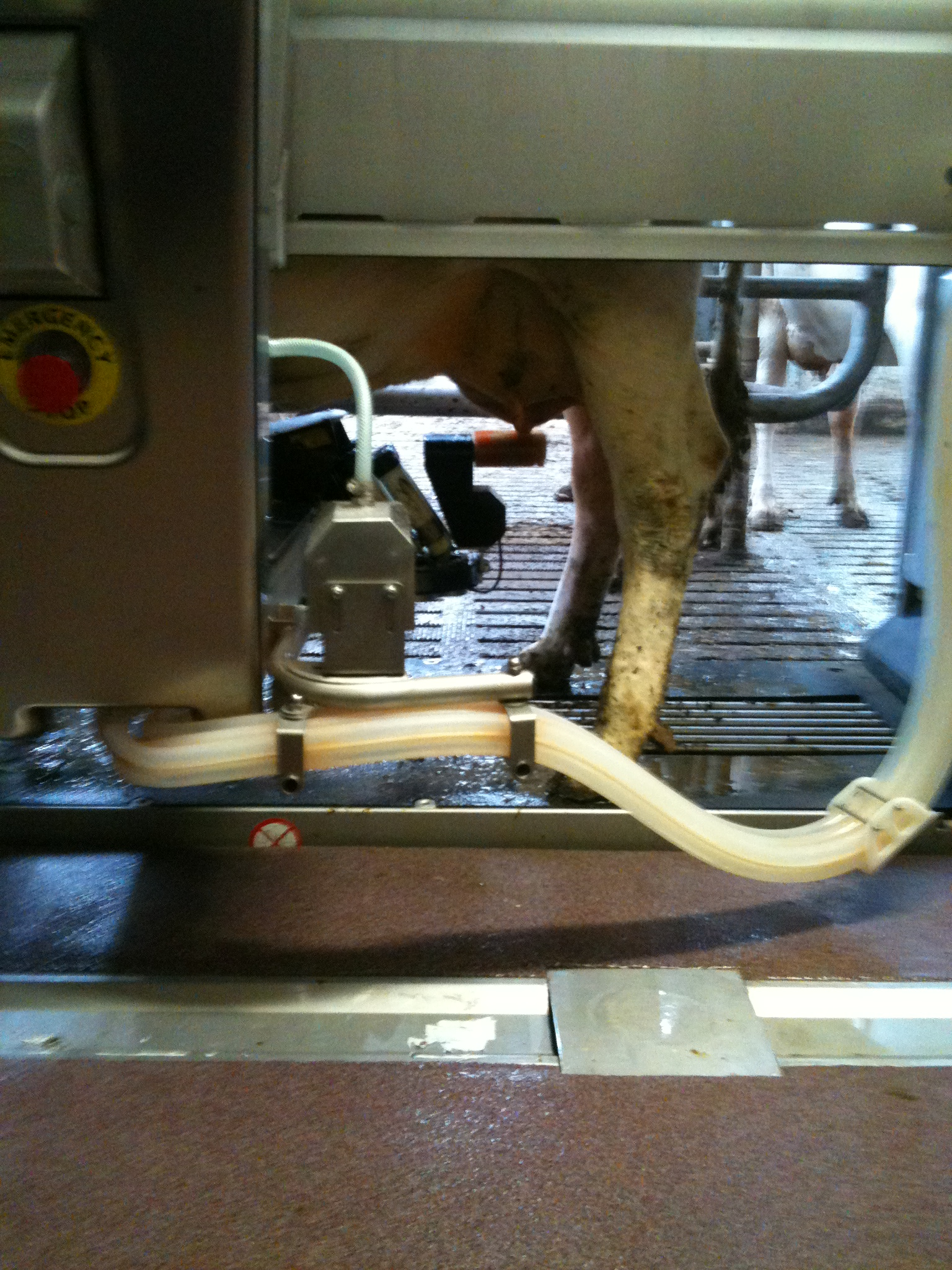
An AMS unit at work (teat cleaning)

- Elimination of labour - The farmer is freed from the milking process and associated rigid schedule, and labour is devoted to supervision of animals, feeding, etc.
- Milking consistency – The milking process is consistent for every cow and every visit, and is not influenced by different persons milking the cows. The four separate milking cups are removed individually, meaning that an empty quarter does not stay attached while the other three are finishing, resulting in less threat of injury. The newest models of automatic milkers can vary the pulsation rate and vacuum level based on milk flow from each quarter.
- Increased milking frequency – Milking frequency may increase to three times per day, however typically 2.5 times per day is achieved. This may result in less stress on the udder and increased comfort for the cow, as on average less milk is stored. Higher frequency milking increases milk yield per cow, however much of this increase is water rather than solids.
- Perceived lower stress environment – There is a perception that elective milking schedules reduce cow stress.
- Herd management – The use of computer control allows greater scope for data collection. Such data allows the farmer to improve management through analysis of trends in the herd, for example response of milk production to changes in feedstuffs. Individual cow histories may also be examined, and alerts set to warn the farmer of unusual changes indicating illness or injury. Information gathering provides added value for AMS, however correct interpretation and use of such information is highly dependent on the skills of the user or the accuracy of computer algorithms to create attention reports.

=== Considerations and disadvantages ===
- Higher initial cost – AMS systems cost approximately €120,000 ($190,524) per milking unit as of 2003 (presuming barn space is already available for loose-stall housing). Equipment costs decreased from $175,000 for the first stall to $158,000. Equipment costs decreased from $10,000/stall for a double-six parlor to $9000/stall for a double-ten parlor with a cost of $1200/stall for pipeline milking. Initial parlor cost was increased $5000/stall to represent a high cost parlor. Whether it is economically beneficial to invest in an AMS instead of a conventional milking parlor depends on constructions costs, investments in the milking system and costs of labour. Besides costs of labour, the availability of labour should also be taken into account. In general, an AMS is economically beneficial for smaller scale farms, and large dairies can usually operate more cheaply with a milking parlor.
- Increased electricity costs - to operate the robots, but this can be more than outweighed by reduced labour input.

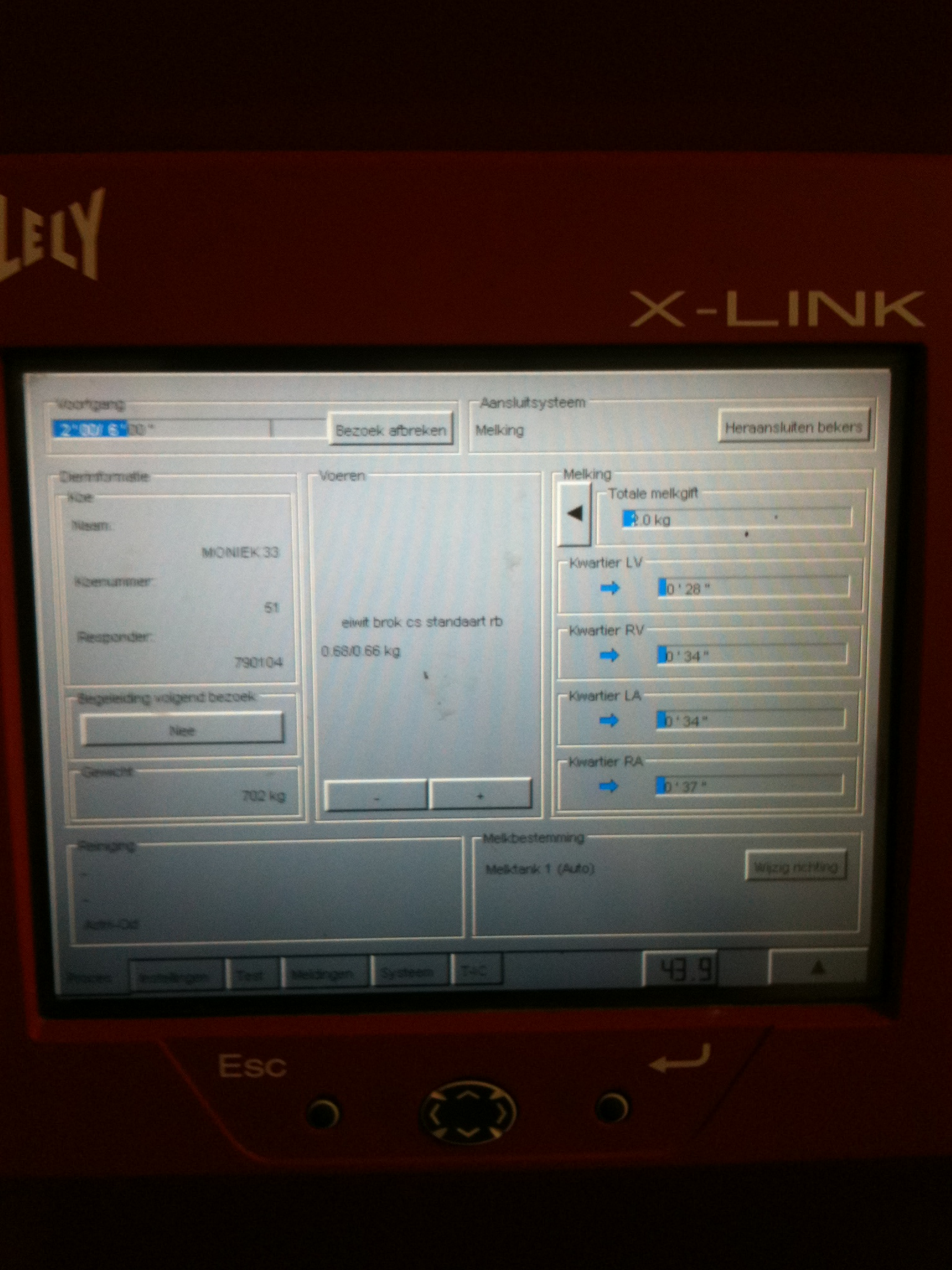
Touchscreen display of a milking robot

- Increased complexity – While complexity of equipment is a necessary part of technological advancement, the increased complexity of the AMS milking unit over conventional systems, increases the reliance on manufacturer maintenance services and possibly increasing operating costs. The farmer is exposed in the event of total system failure, relying on prompt response from the service provider. In practice AMS systems have proved robust and manufacturers provide good service networks. Because all milking cows have to visit the AMS voluntarily, the system requires a high quality of management. The system also involves a central place for the computer in the daily working routines.
- Difficult to apply in pasture systems – as a continuous animal presence is required for an optimal utilization of the AMS unit, AMS works at their best in zero-grazing systems, in which the cow is housed indoors for most of the lactation period. Zero-grazing suits areas (e.g., the Netherlands) where land is at a premium, as maximum land can be devoted to feed production which is then collected by the farmer and brought to the animals in the barn. In pasture systems, cows graze in fields and are required to walk to the milking parlour. It has been found that it can be challenging to make cows maintain a high milking frequency if the distance to walk between pasture and milking unit is too great. Maintaining production on pasture has, however, been shown to be possible in amongst others the AUTOGRASSMILK project. There are currently research projects at the Dexcel facility in New Zealand, University of Sydney's FutureDairy site, Michigan State University's Kellogg Biological Station and the Swedish University of Agricultural Sciences's research facility Lövsta Livestock Research Center, where cattle are on pasture and milked by AMS.
- Lower milk quality –With automatic milking, the number of anaerobic spores, the freezing point increases, the frequency of milk quality failure almost doubles, which fully reflects the quality of milk caused by automatic milking. Although the automatic milking machine cleans the cow's teat and tests the pre-squeezed milk, there is still a phenomenon that the infected milk is not transferred, and the device itself is also lack of cleaning, and the milk is not handled properly. This situation was also confirmed in 2002 when investigating nearly 98 farms in Denmark with automatic milking systems. Bulk milk total bacteria count (BMTBC) and somatic cell count (BMSCC) are also affected by automatic milking. These two counts were studied when introducing an automatic milking system to cows that were previously milked conventionally. BMSCC was found to not significantly increase between pre and post-AMS installation but BMTBC was found to significantly increase in the first three months but then return to normal levels. BMSCC was found to significantly improve in the third year with respect to the pre-introduction level.
- Possible increase in stress for some cows – Cows are social animals, and it has been found that due to dominance of some cows, others will be forced to milk only at night. Such behaviour is inconsistent with the perception that AMS reduces stress by allowing "free choice" of milking time.
- Decreased contact between farmer and herd – Effective animal husbandry requires that the farmer be fully aware of herd condition. In conventional milking, the cows are observed before milking equipment is attached, and ill or injured cows can be earmarked for attention. Automatic milking decreases the time the farmer has such close contact with the animal, with the possibility that illness may go unnoticed for longer periods and both milk quality and cow welfare suffer. In practice, milk quality sensors at the milking unit attempt to detect changes in milk due to infection, and farmers inspect the herd frequently. (Farmers still need to provide bedding for the cows, provide reproductive health services, provide hoof care, feed them, and occasionally repair parts of the barn.) However this concern has meant that farmers are still tied to a seven-day schedule. Modern automatic milking systems attempt to rectify this problem by gathering data that would not be available in many conventional systems including milk temperature, milk conductivity, milk color including infrared scan, change in milking speed, change in milking time or milk letdown by quarter, cow's weight, cow's activity (movements), time spent ruminating, etc.
- Dependence on the robotics company – maintenance becomes significantly more time critical and may put the farmer at greater risk. For example, one farm in Estonia reported losses of over 1 million euros, when the robots from BouMatic Robotics performed below promised standards and the company failed to provide maintenance.

=== Manufacturers ===
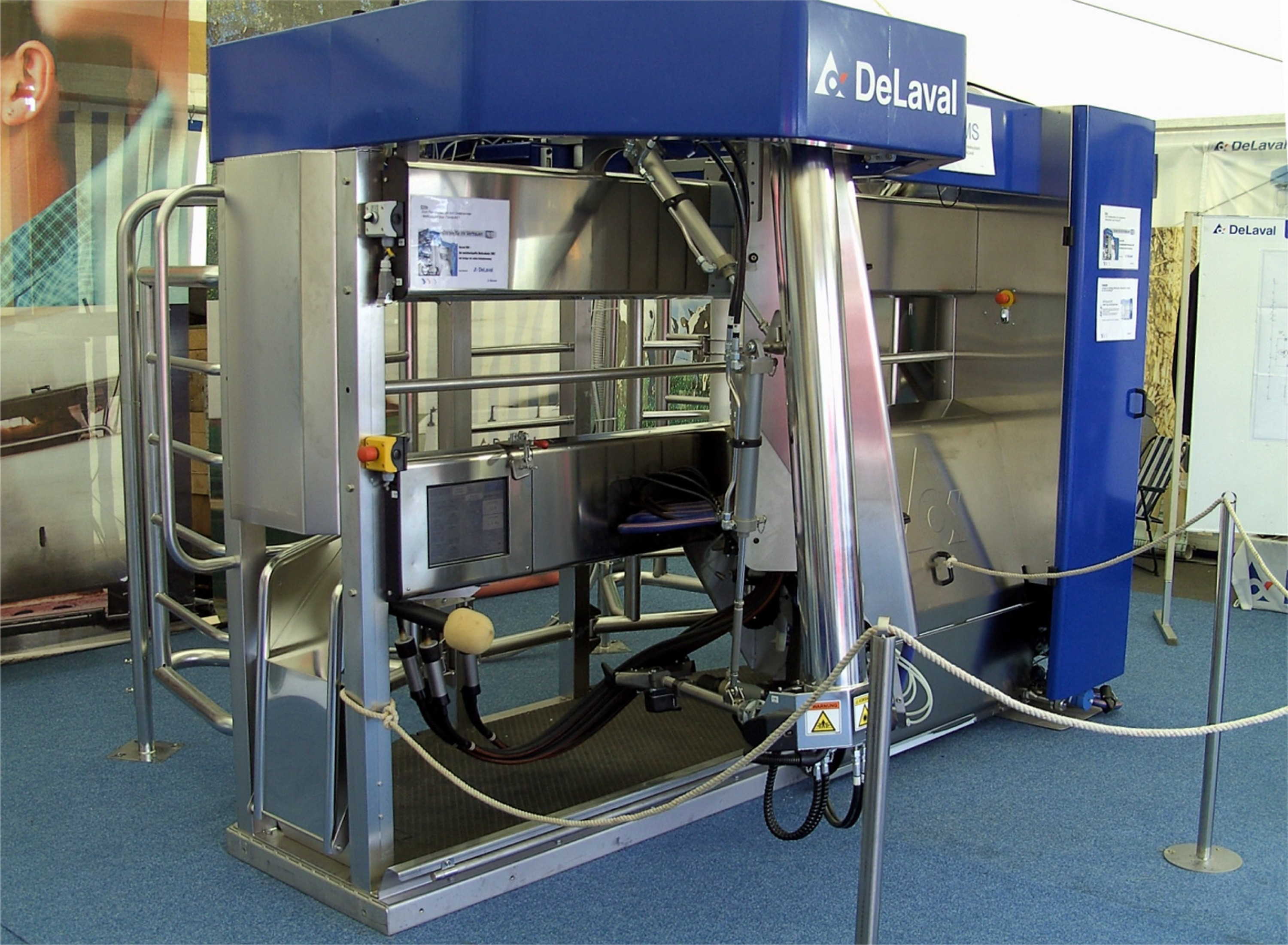
A DeLaval VMS unit, 2007

- GEA Farm Technologies (Germany, formerly WestfaliaSurge), MIone AMS
- Lely (Netherlands), Lely Astronaut AMS
- DeLaval (Sweden), DeLaval VMS
- Fullwood (UK), Merlin AMS
- Milkomax (Canada), Tie-Stall AMS
- SAC (Denmark), purchased the Dutch manufacturer of the Galaxy Robot AMS in 2005, sell under the brands SAC RDS Futureline MARK II, Insentec Galaxy Starline, BouMatic’s ProFlex
- BouMatic (Netherlands), MR-S1, MR-D1
- Prompt Softech (Ahmedabad, India) Manufacturer of Automatic Milk Collection System.
- ADF Milking (UK), Manufacturer of the Automatic Dipping and Flushing system.
- JSC Mototecha Lithuania, manufacturer of mobile milking parlour systems.

== See also ==
- Stranded asset
- Fermentation equipment
- Milk substitute
