= Cowslip (bovine podiatry) =

Shoe used to treat lameness in cattle

In bovine podiatry, a cowslip is a tough plastic shoe used to treat lameness in cattle. It is applied onto the healthy claw (one side of the cloven hoof) with glue and allowed to set. The cowslip will raise the damaged claw off the ground and allow it to heal. The cowslip will slough in about 4–6 weeks and this is a principal advantage over a nail-on shoe which needs to be actively removed.

Cowslips need to be applied to a clean claw. An angle grinder is sometimes used to clean off debris from the claw. The outer layer of the healthy and clean claw can also be ground lightly to provide a rough surface for the glue to adhere to. In cold climates, a hairdryer can be used whilst applying the glue to allow it to set quicker ( 1–2 minutes). While setting the glue, the shoe needs to be held in place. After 4–6 weeks natural hoof growth will slough off the shoe.
