= Henry W. Jeffers =

- Born: Henry Williams Jeffers; January 4, 1871; Harford Township, Pennsylvania
- Died: July 17, 1953 (aged 82); Princeton Hospital; Princeton, New Jersey
- Education: Wyoming Seminary; Cornell University (BS)
- Occupations: Dairyman and Republican Party politician
- Employer: Walker-Gordon Dairy Farm
- Known for: Inventing the Rotolactor; Chairman of the New Jersey Republican State Committee; a founder and first mayor of Plainsboro Township, NJ
- Board member of: New Jersey Board of Agriculture, 1916-1927; advisory boards for the United States Department of Agriculture and the American Food Administration during World War I
- Spouse: Anna C. Adams (m. 1898)

Henry Williams Jeffers (January 4, 1871 – July 17, 1953) was an American dairyman and Republican Party politician who served as chairman of the New Jersey Republican State Committee.

== Biography ==
Jeffers was born in Harford, Pennsylvania, to Watson and Betsey Milburn (Oakley) Jeffers. He attended Wyoming Seminary in Kingston, Pennsylvania, before going on to Cornell University, where he received a B.S. degree in 1899. He married Anna C. Adams on July 14, 1898.

Starting in his senior year at Cornell in 1898, Jeffers worked for the Walker-Gordon Dairy Farm, eventually becoming president in 1918. At Walker-Gordon, based in Plainsboro Township, New Jersey, Jeffers invented a number of technological innovations streamlining dairy production, including the Jeffers bacteriology counter, the Jeffers feed calculator, and the Rotolactor (a rotary milking parlor, a sort of "carousel" for cows, invented in 1930).

Jeffers served on the New Jersey Board of Agriculture from 1916 to 1927. During World War I he served on advisory boards for the United States Department of Agriculture and the American Food Administration under Herbert Hoover.

Jeffers was among the founders of Plainsboro Township, having petitioned the New Jersey Legislature to form a new municipality out of sections of Cranbury and South Brunswick townships. After the township was officially founded on May 6, 1919, Jeffers was elected the first mayor.

Jeffers was also active in Republican politics in New Jersey. He was selected as chairman of the New Jersey Republican State Committee in 1935 when E. Donald Sterner was named State Highway Commissioner. He served until 1937.

Jeffers died on July 17, 1953, at Princeton Hospital in Princeton, New Jersey, at the age of 82.

Party political offices
Preceded by E. Donald Sterner	Chairman of the New Jersey Republican State Committee; 1935–1937	Succeeded by Clayton E. Freeman
