= Rotolactor =

Machine for milking cows

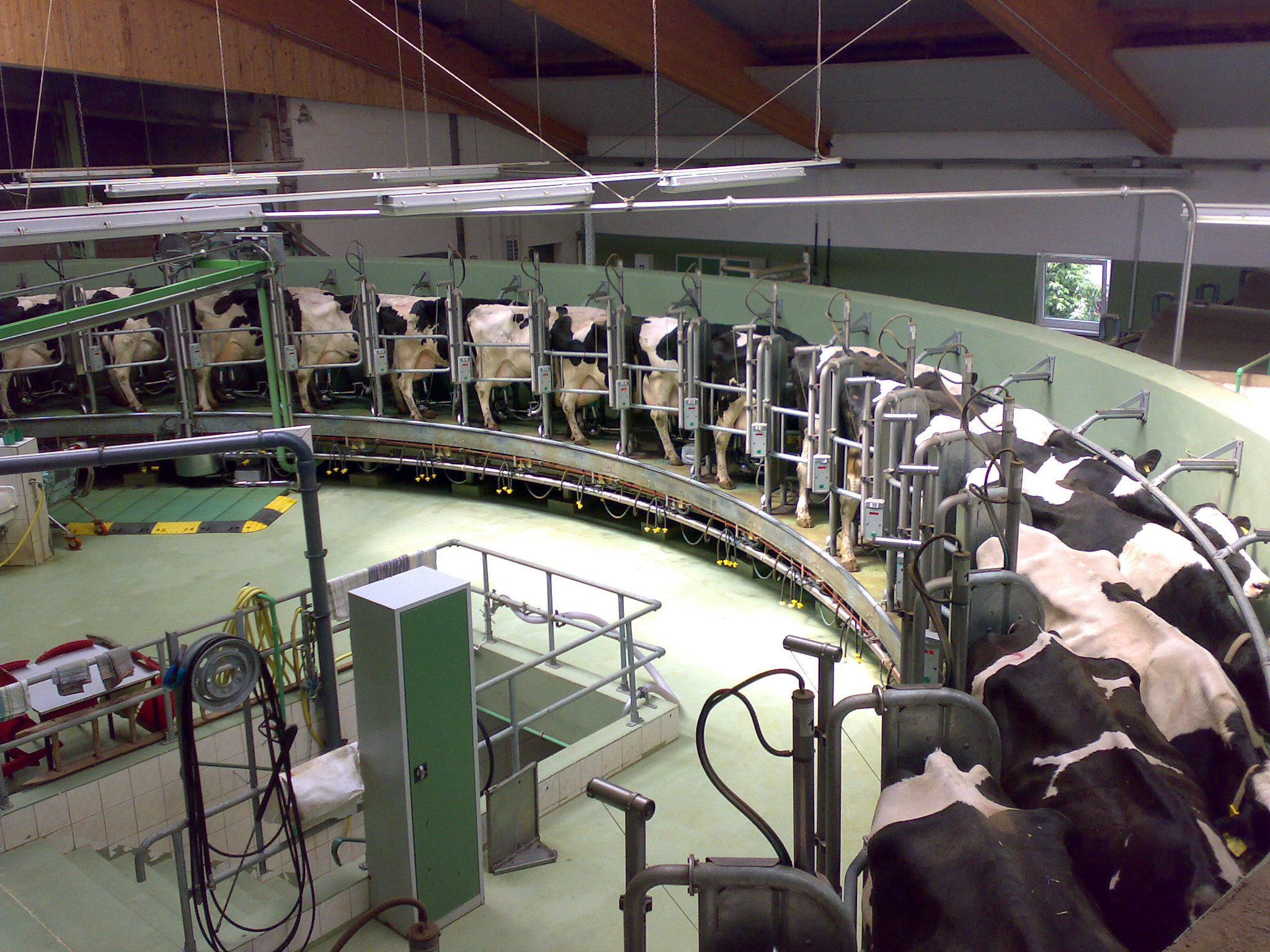
- Modern 2008 "rotary milking parlor" (Rotolactor), Großerkmannsdorf, Germany
- Process type: Cow milking apparatus
- Industrial sector(s): Dairy
- Main technologies or sub-processes: Milking a large number of cows
- Product(s): Rotary milking parlor
- Main facilities: Walker-Gordon Laboratories dairy
- Inventor: Henry W. Jeffers
- Year of invention: 1930
- Developer(s): Borden Company

The Rotolactor is a largely automatic machine used for milking a large number of cows successively using a rotating platform. It was developed by the Borden Company in 1930, and is known as the "rotary milking parlor".

== History ==
The Rotolactor was the first invention for milking a large number of cows using a rotating platform. It was invented by Henry W. Jeffers. The Rotolactor was initially installed in Plainsboro, New Jersey. The rotating mechanical milking machine was first used by the Walker-Gordon Laboratories dairy and was put into operation on November 13, 1930.

== Description ==
The Abstract of the 1930 Cow Milking Apparatus (Rotolactor) patent states:

"The object of this invention is to provide an apparatus whereby an indefinitely large number of cows may be milked successively and largely automatically..."

The Rotolactor held 50 cows and could produce 26,000 quarts of milk. After each cow received a bath, their udders and flanks were cleaned.

The August 1931 issue of the American Journal of Public Health and the Nation's Health described the Rotolactor as an advance in cleanliness and hygiene for milk production.

== Legacy ==
The Rotolactor was featured at the 1939 New York World's Fair in the Borden's exhibit. The Walker-Gordon farm in Plainsboro later became a museum. The farm building in Plainsboro containing the Rotolactor had an observation room to accommodate visitors, including large groups of school children.

A 1930 film was titled: "New Jersey. 'The Rotolactor' - hygiene's latest - automatically washing and milking 50 cows at one time in 12 1/2 minutes - inaugurated by Mr. Thomas Edison."

The Walker-Gordon farm stopped producing dairy products on June 18, 1971.

== See also ==
- Automatic milking

== Bibliography ==
- Hart, William (2003). Plainsboro. Arcadia Publishing. ISBN 978-0-7385-1168-9.
- Kane, Joseph Nathan (1997), Famous First Facts, A Record of First Happenings, Discoveries, and Inventions in American History (Fifth Edition), The H.W. Wilson Company, ISBN 0-8242-0930-3
- Patton, Stuart (2004). Milk: Its Remarkable Contribution to Human Health and Well-Being. Transaction Publishers. ISBN 978-1-4128-2876-5.
