= GEA Group =

German corporation

GEA Group AG
- Company type: Publicly traded company
- Traded as: {{DE:DAX|DAI}}
- ISIN: DE0006602006
- Industry: Food industry
- Founded: 1881; 145 years ago
- Headquarters: Düsseldorf, Germany
- Key people: Stefan Klebert (CEO), Johannes Giloth (Chief operating officer), Bernd Brinker (Chief Financial Officer), Dieter Kempf (Chairman of the supervisory board),
- Revenue: €5,165 million (2022)
- Number of employees: 18,236 (2022)
- Website: www.gea.com

GEA Group AG (German: Gesellschaft für Entstaubungsanlagen; literally "company for dedusting systems") is a German corporation, mostly active in the food and beverages sector, headquartered in Düsseldorf, Germany. As of 2019, it was one of the world's largest suppliers of process technology and components in the food and beverages industry (around 70% of its business) and several other industries, employing almost 18,000 people globally as of 2017. The company is listed on the DAX.

== History ==
=== Origins ===
The ancestor of today's GEA AG was Metallgesellschaft AG (MG), established as a metal trading company in 1881 in Frankfurt am Main by Wilhelm Merton together with Leo Ellinger (born November 21, 1852, in Frankfurt am Main; died July 16, 1916, there).

Between 1881 and 1914, MG was already represented on all continents and invested in mines and metallurgical plants. Due to World War I, it lost a large proportion of foreign investments and started chemical trading. In 1920, Gesellschaft für Entstaubungsanlagen (GEA) was founded by Otto Happel, to produce de-dusting equipment.

=== Nazi era ===
When the Nazis came to power in Germany in 1933, Alfred and Richard Merton were expelled from all public offices by the National Socialists because of their Jewish origins. Alfred emigrated to the USA in 1934, and Richard was imprisoned in the Buchenwald concentration camp during the November pogroms in 1938. His private property was confiscated, and he was able to flee with his family to London in 1939. Subsequently, as part of the Aryanization process, the German Reich appointed a state commissioner as chairman of the board of the company, which was important for the war economy.

=== Postwar period ===
In 1946, the Metallgesellschaft participated in the founding of the Frankfurter Trümmerverwertungsgesellschaft (Frankfurt Rubble Utilization Company), which received attention throughout Germany and the world. From 1949 to 1960, the company's processing plant for rubble in Frankfurt-Bornheim produced building materials for the reconstruction of some 100,000 buildings destroyed in the air raids on Frankfurt.

In 1947, the OMGUS report determined that Metallgesellschaft was not a beneficiary of the war economy. The U.S. investigator in charge also emphasized that the company neither employed concentration camp workers nor specifically participated in the war machine. The company's production facilities were not spared bombing during World War II, but were able to resume operations soon after the war ended. However, the loss of the eastern territories meant that the company lost an important raw materials market.

Richard Merton returned from exile to Frankfurt in 1948 and became a member of the company's Supervisory Board. Due to World War II, MG's and GEA's production facilities suffered extensive destruction. Production started up again with about 70 employees in a small, undamaged building a few weeks after the war ended. At that time, many business transactions—including salaries—were barter deals. While reconstruction work progressed in the following years, the company was hit hard once again. The day after Christmas in 1948, GEA's founder Otto Happel died. His widow, Elisabeth Happel just eleven months earlier, took over the company's management. In the late 1940s and early 1950s, the reconstruction of power plants helped GEA get back on track.

=== Late 20th century ===
Following the reconstruction, numerous innovations ensured the future of the company. In 1989, GEA went public and an era of expansion and globalization started. 1991-1995 GEA executed several acquisitions including Grasso, Niro, Westfalia Separator and Tuchenhagen. MG also made a key decision with the acquisition of Dynamit Nobel AG, which resulted in entering the chemical industry.

The 1990 oil price shock caused the oil-business loss in the US, which pushed MG into crisis. MG answered with a fundamental realignment marking the transition to an innovative focus technology group. Restructuring entailed a divestment of around 300 group companies and set the focus on chemicals and engineering.

=== 21st century ===
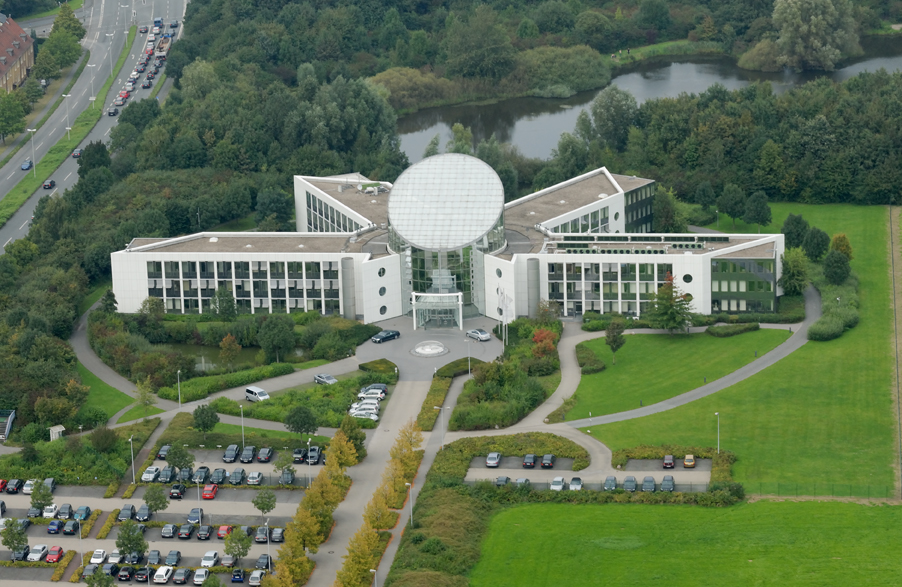
Aerial view of GEA Center Bochum, pictured in 2007

In 1999, Metallgesellschaft acquired GEA AG and in 2000 was renamed to mg technologies ag. In 2003, the enterprise went through a strategic reorganization to specialize in special purpose machinery with a focus on process engineering, components and plant engineering.

2005 brought important changes in the form of selling the Dynamit Nobel Plastics business unit and renaming the company to GEA Group Aktiengesellschaft, while it relocated its headquarters to Bochum. Since 2011, the company has had its headquarters in Airport City near Düsseldorf Airport. Several mergers and acquisitions resulted in a practical fragmentation of GEA's business activities. To address this, the "OneGEA" project was introduced in 2015, implementing a new integrated group structure. The technology portfolio expanded with the acquisitions of CMT, Comas and Hilge. One of the new initiatives, an ideas campaign, appears to have been unsuccessful, with Kerzner (2019) writing: "The results at GEA show that if you do not spend the time to create a clear focus and expectations of idea campaigns, you will not get ideas that solve the real challenges the company is facing."

In 2024, GEA Group partnered with Believer Meats to co-develop cultured meat technologies, including with a new production facility in Wilson County, North Carolina.

In September 2025, GEA replaced Porsche in the DAX.

== Business ==
The GEA Group has over 250 operating subsidiaries worldwide that supply process technology and components for various production processes, primarily in the food and beverage industries.

GEA is a member of ”Blue Competence”, an initiative of the German Engineering Association (VDMA).

== See also ==
- Automated milking
- Bock GmbH

== Bibliography ==
- Kerzner, Harold (9 July 2019). "Innovation in action: GEA". Innovation Project Management: Methods, Case Studies, and Tools for Managing Innovation Projects. John Wiley & Sons. pp. 410–418. ISBN 978-1-119-58733-0.
