= Carl Happel =

German painter (1819-1914)

- Born: 2 August 1819; Heidelberg
- Died: 7 March 1914 (aged 94); Stuttgart
- Known for: Painting, sculpture

Carl Happel (2 August 1819 – 7 March 1914) was a German painter.
