= Otto Happel =

German billionaire businessman

- Born: 9 February 1948 (age 78); Bochum, Germany
- Education: RWTH Aachen University
- Children: 6

Otto Happel (born 9 February 1948) is a Swiss-based German billionaire businessman, the former owner and CEO of GEA Group. As of May 2026, Forbes estimated his net worth at US$4.1 billion.

== Early life ==
Happel received his PhD in engineering from RWTH Aachen University.

== Career ==
In 1974, Happel became CEO of GEA, a small family business established by his father in 1920 with approximately Euro 100 million in revenues.

Over the next 25 years, he transformed GEA into a global system supplier and introduced machinery and plants for the food processing industry, power industry, air-conditioning and refrigeration industry. After making over 70 acquisitions, GEA had over 200 subsidiaries in 60 countries. In 1989 he took his company public at the Frankfurt stock exchange, but kept the majority of the voting stock in the family. By 1999, Happel had increased GEA's revenues to over €2.6 billion, as well as its net earnings proportionally.

In 1999, he merged his controlling stake with Germany's MG Technologies, remained the largest shareholder of the combined business and, once MG Technologies merged into GEA Group AG, sold his stake to institutional investors in 2006. GEA Group AG is the largest German machinery manufacturer listed in the German DAX (WKN 660200), and is broadly diversified. In 2025, it had revenues of approximately EUR 5.5 billion and employed approximately 18,000 people.

He was a member of the supervisory board at Commerzbank from May 1993 to April 2013.

== Personal life ==
Happel is married, with six children, and lives in Lucerne, Switzerland.
