= Bovine podiatry =

Branch of veterinary medicine

Bovine podiatry is a branch of veterinary medicine concerned with the diagnosis and treatment of the defects of a bovine hoof.

== See also ==
- Cow hoof
- Cowslip
