= NextGenPower =

NextGenPower is an integrated project which aims to demonstrate new alloys and coatings in boiler, turbine and interconnecting pipework. The concept of NextGenPower is to perform innovative demonstrations that will significantly contribute to the EU target to increase the efficiency in existing and new build pulverized coal power plants.

== Background ==
Carbon Capture and Storage (CCS) is envisaged to be the main transition technology to comply with the CO_{2} reduction targets set by the European Commission. However, CCS has the drawback that the electrical efficiency of the coal-fired power plant will drop significantly. The efficiency loss caused by CCS in coal-fired power plants will range from 4 to 12% points, depending on the CCS technology chosen. To overcome this drawback, one has to increase the plant efficiency or the share of biomass co-firing. Both options are limited due to the quality of the current available coatings and materials. Live steam temperatures well in excess of 700 °C are necessary to compensate the efficiency loss caused by CCS and to achieve a net efficiency of 45%. NextGenPower aims to develop and demonstrate coatings and materials that can be applied in ultra-supercritical (in excess of 700˚C) conditions.

== Summary ==
The NextGenPower project was due to start on 1 May 2010 and have a duration of 48 months. The budget is €10.3million, with an EU contribution making up €6million of the budget.

== Objectives ==
The following scientific and technological objectives have been defined for NextGenPower, leading to the following project activities:

- Demonstrating the application of precipitation hardened Nickel-alloys for pulverized coal-fired boilers having allowable levels of creep and fatigue evolving from high temperatures envisaged with USC
- Demonstrating the application of cost-effective fireside coatings, compatible with affordable and available tube alloys, for coal-fired boilers capable of withstanding the corrosive conditions envisaged with USC and the environment of biomass co-firing under different conditions
- Demonstrating the application of cost-effective steam side coatings/protective layers to extend the life of boiler tube and interconnecting pipe work, and to facilitate the use of cheaper alternative materials without compromising component life or reliability
- Demonstrating the application of Ni-alloys for interconnecting pipe work between boiler and steam turbine withstanding high temperatures envisaged with USC and to explore alternative design options to allow for the use of cheaper, more available materials than Ni-alloys
- Demonstrating the capability to cast, forge and weld Ni-alloys for critical steam turbine components

== Sub-projects ==
There are also four sub-projects which will be focused on throughout the course of the NextGenPower project.

=== Sub Project 1 – boiler ===
NextGenPower aims at overcoming fireside corrosion and steamside oxidation in high temperature parts through the application of suitable coatings. The main goal for Sub Project 1 is to demonstrate the benefits and limitations of materials and coatings for the fireside under biomass co-firing conditions as well as for the boiler and main steam pipework under USC and current steam conditions.

=== Sub Project 2 - steam turbine ===
The main goals for Sub Project 2 are to select the best candidate alloys for the HP and ID steam turbines operating at high steam temperatures (≥720˚C). A number of nickel-base alloys have been developed whose properties have been proven at the laboratory scale and for small-scale components. The main uncertainty in the application of these alloys for steam turbine applications is the ability to manufacture, weld and inspect large components. The performance in service presents a much smaller risk since there is confidence that the mechanical behaviour can be modelled on the basis of the material properties. This philosophy follows the approach applied in the development, demonstration and exploitation of materials technology for 700-720˚C steam turbines in other projects (AD700, COMTES, EON 50plus) where the first commercial steam turbine will enter service without prior operation in a test loop. Following alloy selection, full-scale steam turbine casings and rotor forgings will be manufactured and materials properties demonstrated through implementation of a mechanical testing programme. Full-scale demonstration of the welding technology and the NDE capability required for welded rotor and casing manufacture will also be carried out.

=== Sub Project 3 – integration ===
Sub Project 3 provides a framework for the testing and demonstration work in the overall project. It will review the expected operating parameters required for NGP plants, with and without CO_{2} capture technologies, and with and without biomass co-firing. The aim is to evaluate a series of NextGenPower plants with CCS systems in terms of their power generation efficiencies and CO_{2} emissions per unit of electricity generated.

=== Sub Project 4 – dissemination ===
The main goal for Sub Project 4 is to ensure that the generic results and results from topical activities are actively disseminated. It promotes results and approaches and encourages the duplication in other, thereby contributing to EU objectives of the CO_{2} reduction, efficiency improvement and security of energy supply. Another objective is to facilitate the sharing of policies, approaches and knowledge between the participants.

== Participants ==
- Aubert & Duval
- Cranfield University
- Doosan Babcock
- E.on
- Goodwin Steel Castings Ltd
- Kema
- Monitor Coatings
- Saarschmiede
- Skoda Power
- TUD
- VTT Technical Research Centre of Finland
- VUZ
