= Glossary of boiler terms =

Boilers for generating steam or hot water have been designed in countless shapes, sizes and configurations. An extensive terminology has evolved to describe their common features. This glossary provides definitions for these terms.

Terms which relate solely to boilers used for space heating or generating hot water are identified by (HVAC).

== A-B ==
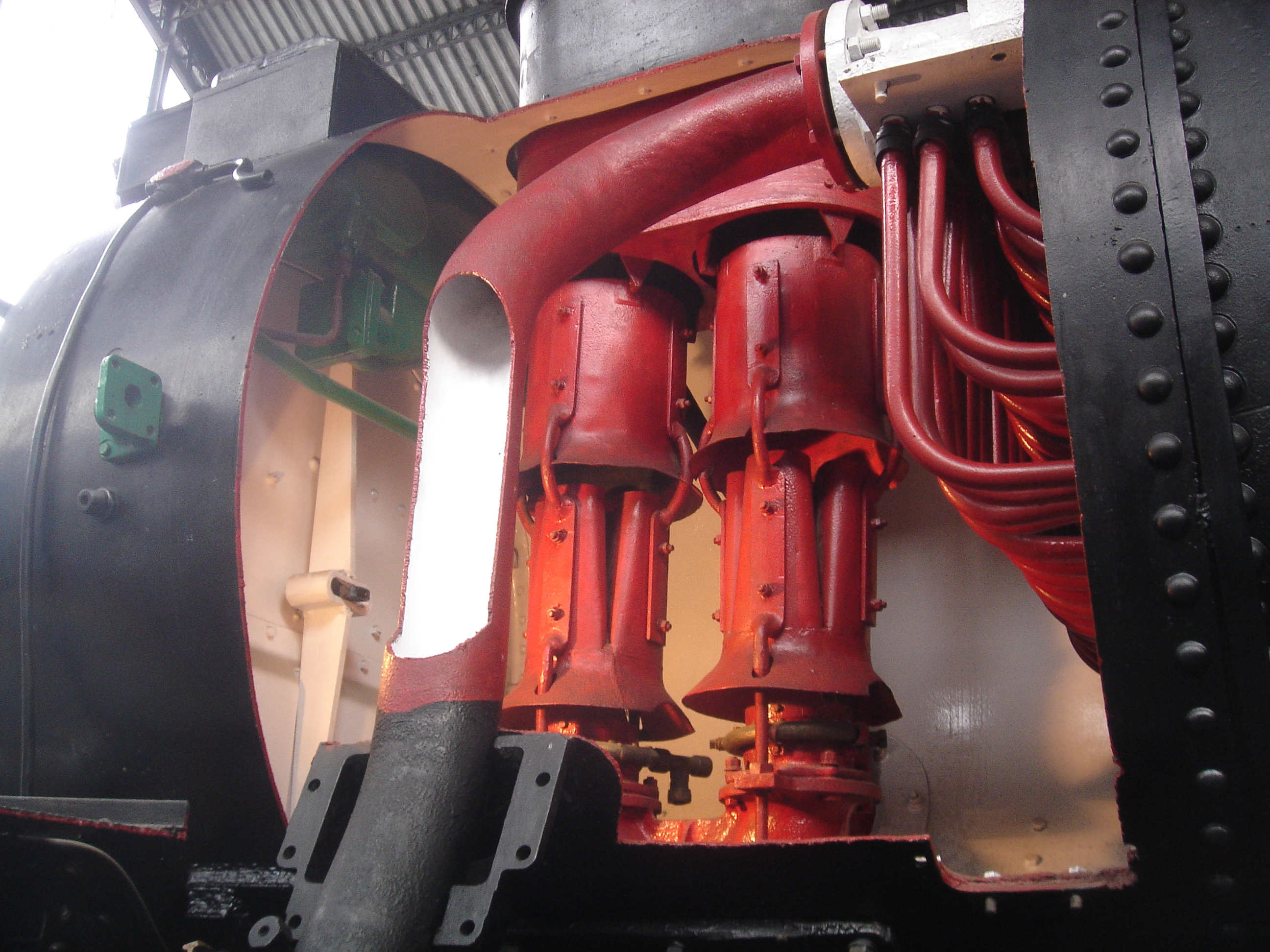
Steam locomotive blastpipe

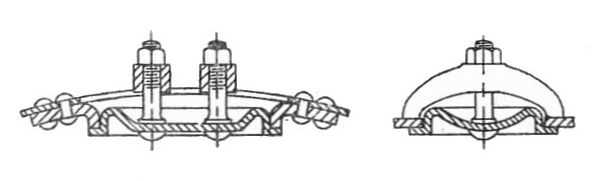
Section through manhole and bridge clamp

Ashpan
A container beneath the furnace, catching ash and clinker that falls through the firebars. This may be made of brickwork for a stationary boiler, or steel sheet for a locomotive. Ashpans are often the location of the damper. They may also be shaped into hoppers, for easy cleaning during disposal.
Blastpipe
Part of the exhaust system that discharges exhaust steam from the cylinders into the smokebox beneath the chimney in order to increase the draught through the fire.
Blow-down
Periodic venting of water from the boiler. This water contains the most concentrated precursors for sludge build-up, so by venting it while still dissolved, the build-up is reduced. When early marine boilers were fed with salt water, they would be blown-down several times an hour.
Blow-down cock
A valve mounted low-down on the boiler, often around the foundation ring, which is used for blow down.
Blower
The blower provides a forced draught on the fire, encouraging combustion. It consists of a hollow ring mounted either in the base of the chimney or on top of the blastpipe. Holes are drilled in the top of the blower ring, and when steam is fed into the ring, the steam jets out of the holes and up the chimney, stimulating draught, much like a blastpipe.
Boiler
A pressure vessel for the creation of hot water or steam, for residential or commercial use.
Boilersmith
A craftsman skilled in the techniques required for the construction and repair of boilers - not to be confused with a boilermaker (common misconception). A boilermaker is a skilled metalworker, usually the member of a union of the same name, skilled in platework or welding. A boilermaker may or may not be a boilersmith. A boilersmith may also be a member of another trade, such as a plumber or pipeworker, and so may not be a boilermaker.
Boiler stay
A structural element inside a boiler which supports surfaces under pressure by tying them together.
Boiler suit
Heavy-duty one-piece protective clothing, worn when removing limescale from the inside of boilers and inspecting the inside of a firebox for steam leaks, for which task it is necessary to crawl through the firehole door.
Boiler ticket
The safety certificate issued for a steam (locomotive) boiler on passing a formal inspection after a major rebuild, and generally covering a period of ten years (eight years on the mainline). Additional annual safety inspections must also be undertaken, which may result in the locomotive being withdrawn from service if the boiler requires work. When the ticket "expires" the locomotive cannot be used until the boiler has been overhauled or replaced, and a new ticket obtained.
Boiler water treatment
Removal or chemical modification of boiler feedwater impurities to avoid scale, corrosion, or foaming.
Brick arch
A horizontal baffle of firebrick within the furnace, usually of a locomotive boiler. This forces combustion gases from the front of the furnace to flow further, back over the rest of the furnace, encouraging efficient combustion. The invention of the brick arch, along with the blastpipe and forced draught, was a major factor in allowing early locomotives to begin to burn coal, rather than coke.
Bridge clamp

== C-E ==
Carryover
The damaging condition where water droplets are carried out of the boiler along with the dry steam. These can cause scouring in turbines or hydraulic lock in cylinders. The risk is accentuated by dirty feedwater.
See also priming.
Check valve
Clack valve
Clack from the noise it makes. A non-return valve where the feedwater enters the boiler drum. They are usually mounted halfway along the boiler drum, or else as a top feed, but away from the firebox, so as to avoid stressing it with the shock of cold water.
Cladding
The layer of insulation and outer wrapping around a boiler shell, particularly that of a steam locomotive. In early practice this was usually wooden strips held by brass bands. Later and modern practice is to use asbestos insulation matting (or other less hazardous fibres) covered with rolled steel sheets. On some locomotives Russia iron was used for cladding. The outer shape of the cladding is often a simplification of the underlying boiler shell. Also termed "clothing" in LMS practice.
Crinolines
The framework of hoops used to support cladding over a boiler. Named from the similar hoops under a crinoline skirt.
Crown sheet
The upper sheet of the inner firebox on a locomotive boiler. It is the hottest part of the firebox, and sometimes at risk of boiler explosion should the water level drop and the crown sheet be exposed and thus allowed to overheat. Supported from above by complex stays.
Damper
An adjustable flap controlling the air admitted beneath the fire-bed. Usually part of the ashpan.
Disposal
The cleanup process at the end of the working day, usually involving dropping the fire and blowing down the boiler.
Dome
A raised location on the top of the main boiler drum, providing a high point from which to collect dry steam, reducing the risk of priming.
Downcomer
Large external pipes in many water-tube boilers, carrying unheated cold water from the steam drum down to the water drum as part of the circulation path.
Drowned tube
Either a fire-tube or water-tube that is entirely below the water-level of the operating boiler. As corrosion and scaling is most active in the region of the water-level, this reduces wear and maintenance requirements.
Exhaust injector
A feedwater injector that economizes on steam consumption by using waste steam, such as engine exhaust.

== F ==
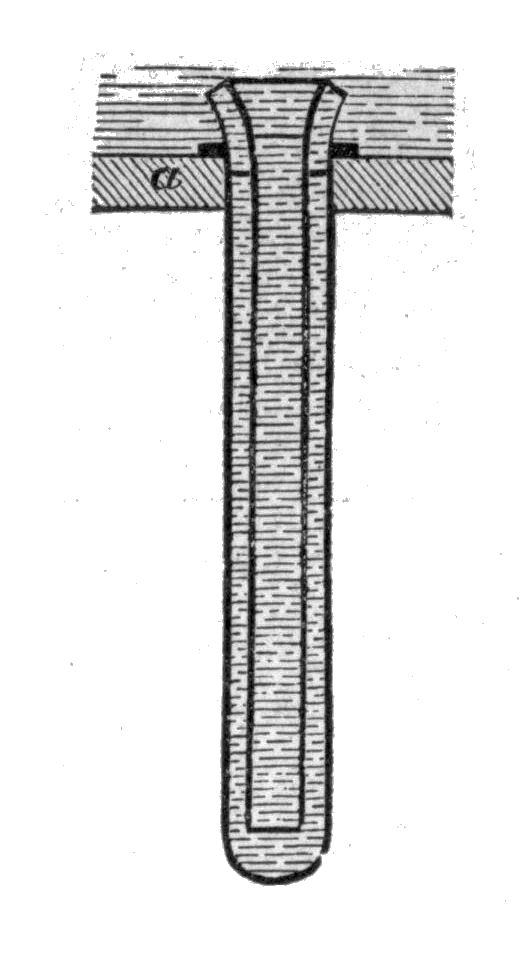
Field-tube

Feedwater
Feedwater pump
Field-tube
A form of water-tube where the water tubes are single-ended, similar to a thimble water tube with an internal tube to encourage circulation.
Firebar
Replaceable cast-iron bars that form the base of the furnace and support the fire. These wear out frequently, so are designed for easy replacement. See also: Rocking grate.
Firebox
In a steam engine, the area where the fuel is burned.
Firedoor
A door leading from outside the boiler into the firebox, through which fuel (such as coal) could be added by stokers.
Fire dropping
Emptying out the remains of the fire after a day's work. A time-consuming and filthy task; labour-saving ways to improve this became important in the final days of steam locomotives.
Fire-tube
Fire-tube boiler
A boiler where the primary heating surface is tubes with hot gas flowing inside and water outside. See also: water-tube boiler.
Flash steam
Flue
A large fire tube, either used as the main heating surface in a flued boiler, or used as enlarged firetubes in a locomotive-style boiler where these contain the superheater elements.
Flued boiler
Foundation ring
The base of the firebox, where the inner and outer shells are joined.
Furnace
Fusible plug
A safety device that indicates if the water level becomes dangerously low. It melts when overheated, releasing a jet of steam into the firebox and alerting the crew.

== G-K ==
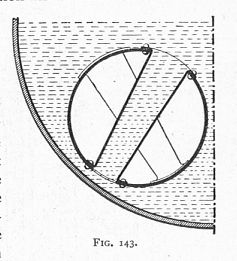
Galloway tubes

Galloway tubes
tapered thermic syphon water-tubes inserted in the furnace of a Lancashire boiler.
Gauge glass
part of the water level gauge, which normally consists of a vertical glass tube connected top and bottom to the boiler backplate. The water level must be visible within the glass at all times.
Grooving
erosion of a boiler's plates from the internal water space, particularly where there is a step inside the shell. This was a problem for early boilers made from lapped plates rather than butted plates, and gave rise to many boiler explosions. In later years it was a problem for the non-circular water drums of Yarrow boilers.
Handhole
A small manhole, too small for access but useful for inspection and washing out the boiler. See also mudhole
Injector
a feedwater pump without moving parts that uses steam pressure and the Bernoulli effect to force feedwater into the boiler, even against its pressure.
Klinger gauge glass
A form of gauge glass where the water level is visible through a flat glass window in a strong metal frame, rather than a cylindrical tube. These were popular with some operators, and increasingly so for high pressure boilers.

== M-R ==
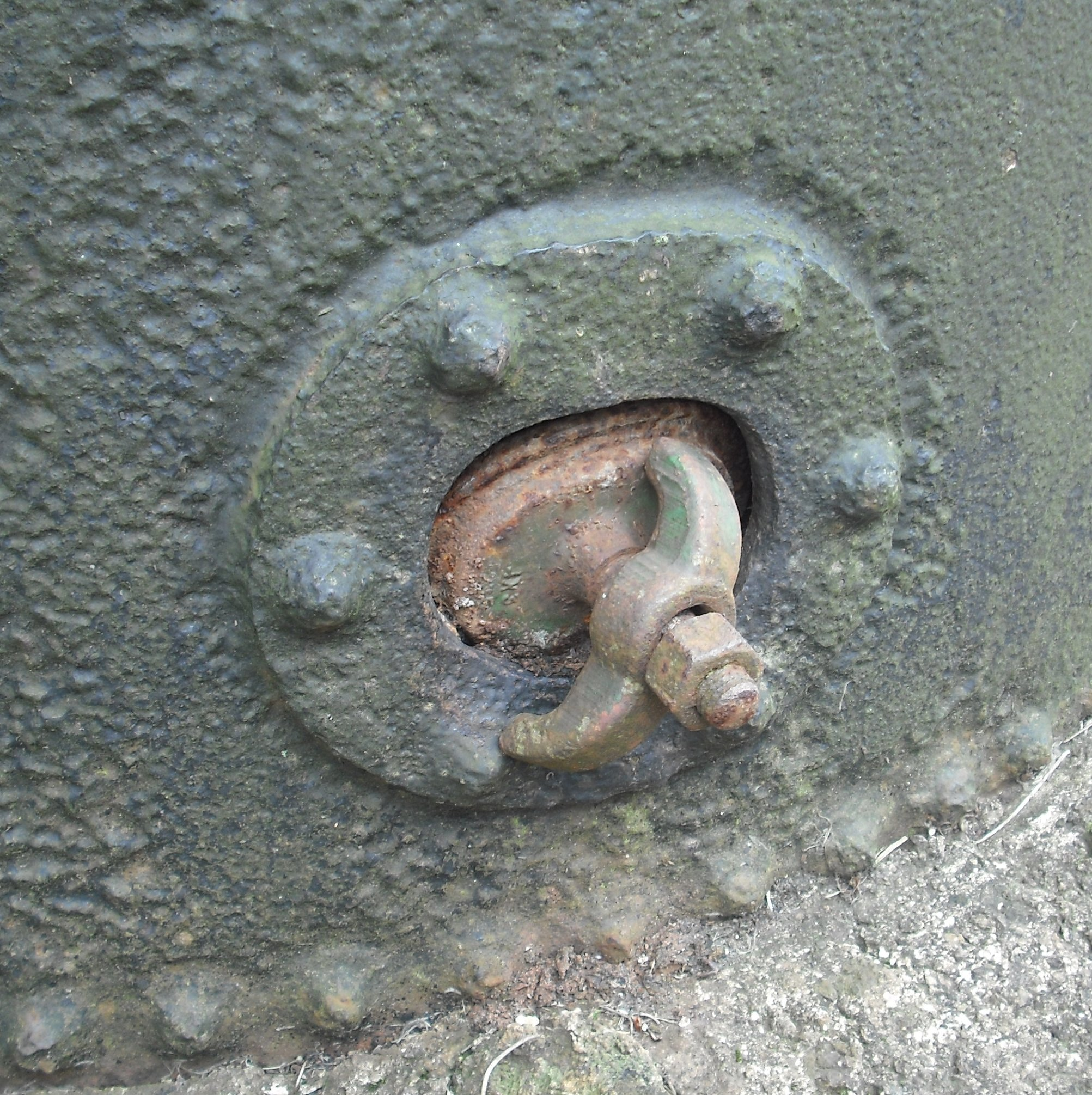
Mudhole and bridge clamp on a vertical boiler

Manhole
an oval access door into a part of the boiler, for example the shell or, in a water tube boiler, the top drum or chamber, large enough for a worker to enter and used for maintenance and cleaning. Manholes are sealed with a removable door from the inside. As they are oval, this door may be turned and lifted out through the hole. Doors are clamped in place from the outside with one or two bridge clamps spanning the hole and tightened down with a nut on a stud. As the cutting of a manhole weakens the boiler shell, the surrounding area is strengthened with a patch.
Mud
a sludge of boiler scale particles, precipitates and general impurities that builds up in the lower parts of a boiler. Mud reduces water circulation and so a local buildup may lead to localized overheating and possibly explosion.
Mud drum
a water drum, particularly one mounted low on the boiler whose function is primarily to trap mud from circulation.
Mudhole
A small manhole, too small for access but useful for washing out the boiler, either as an inlet for a hose or as a drain for removed mud. See also washout plug
Priming
Where a sudden reduction of steam pressure caused by a large, suddenly applied load may result in boiler water being pulled into the pipework.
Regulator
Rocking grate
An advanced form of firebar, where sections of the grate may be rocked or tipped to either break up clinker within the fire, or to drop the fire after a day's work.

== S ==
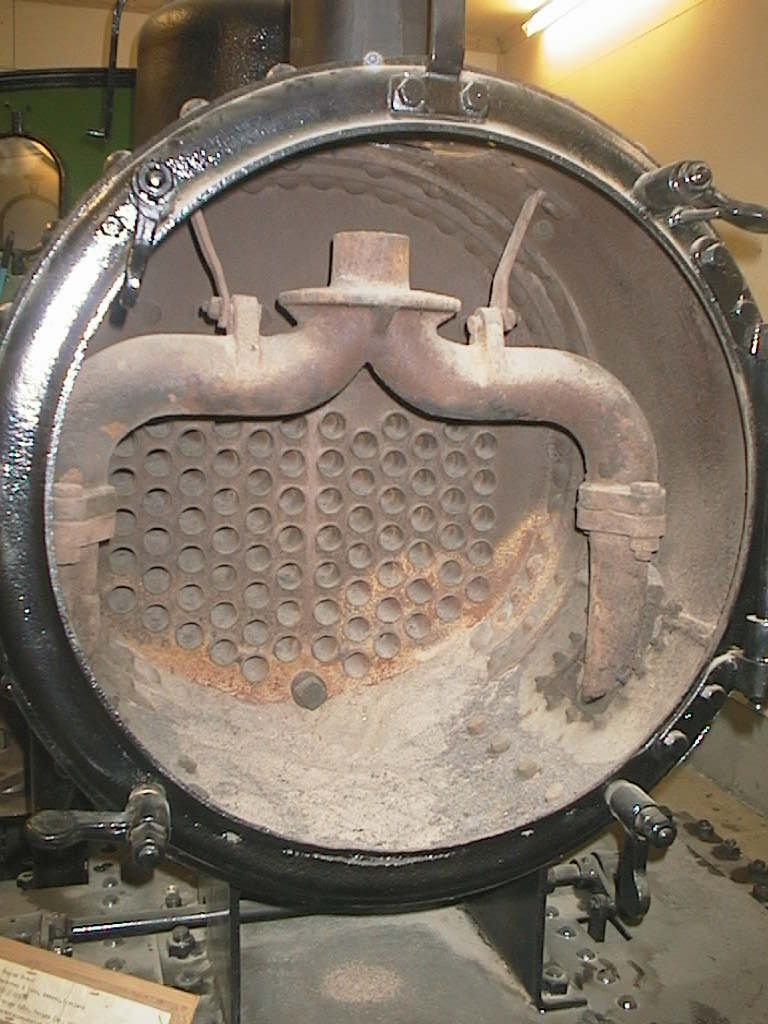
Smokebox

Safety valve
an automatic valve used to release excess pressure within the boiler.
Scale
a type of fouling caused by dissolved minerals from hard water precipitating out in the steam space around the water-level. Where this scale falls to the bottom of the boiler and mixes with other contaminants, it is termed mud.
Scum valve
A blow-down valve mounted at the water-level of a boiler, used to blow down lighter oily or foamy deposits within a boiler that float on the water-level.
Sludge
another term for mud.
Smokebox
an enclosed space at the extremity of a fire-tube boiler, where the exhaust gases from the tubes are combined and pass to the flue or chimney.
Snifting valve
Steam accumulator
Steam drum
a cylindrical vessel mounted at a high point of a water-tube boiler, where dry steam may separate above the water level, so that it may be drawn off without risk of priming. This is similar to the function of a dome in a fire-tube boiler.
Steam & water drum
a steam drum that contains a turbulent mixture of steam and water, with a substantial part of this being water. The terms are used somewhat interchangeably.
Steam drier
a form of mild superheater that adds additional heat to wet- or saturated steam, thus ensuring that all water in the steam has been evaporated, thus avoiding problems with water droplets in the cylinders or turbine. Unlike the superheater, the steam drier does not attempt to raise the temperature of the steam significantly beyond the boiling point.
Steam generator
Steam separator
Suction valve
an automatic non-return valve, which opens when the boiler is at less than atmospheric pressure. This avoids any risk of vacuum collapse, when a hot boiler is allowed to cool down out of service.
Superheater
If superheated steam is required it passes through a superheater, a heat exchanger where additional heat is added to the saturated steam.

== T-W ==
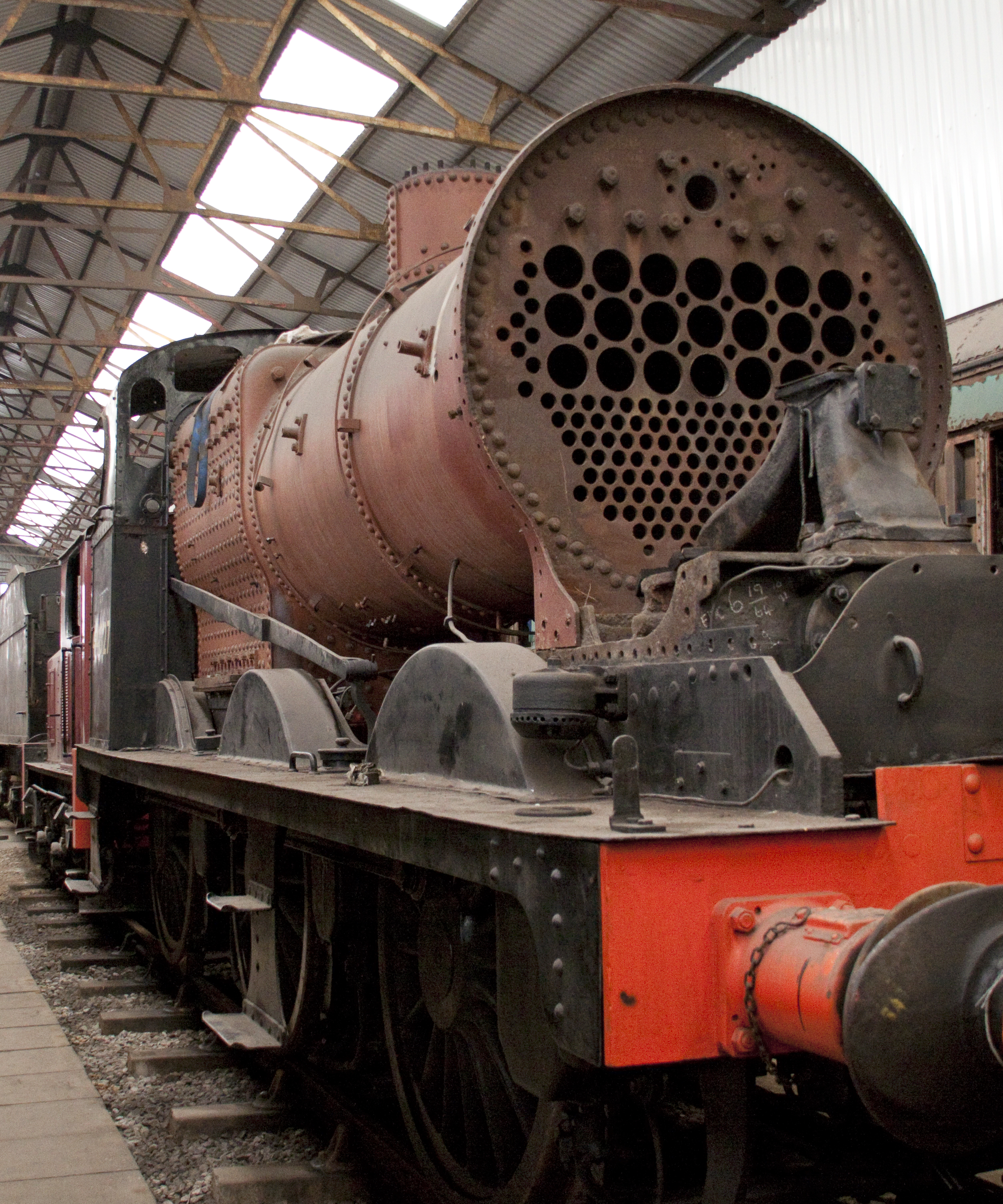
Dismantled steam locomotive, showing the smokebox tubeplate

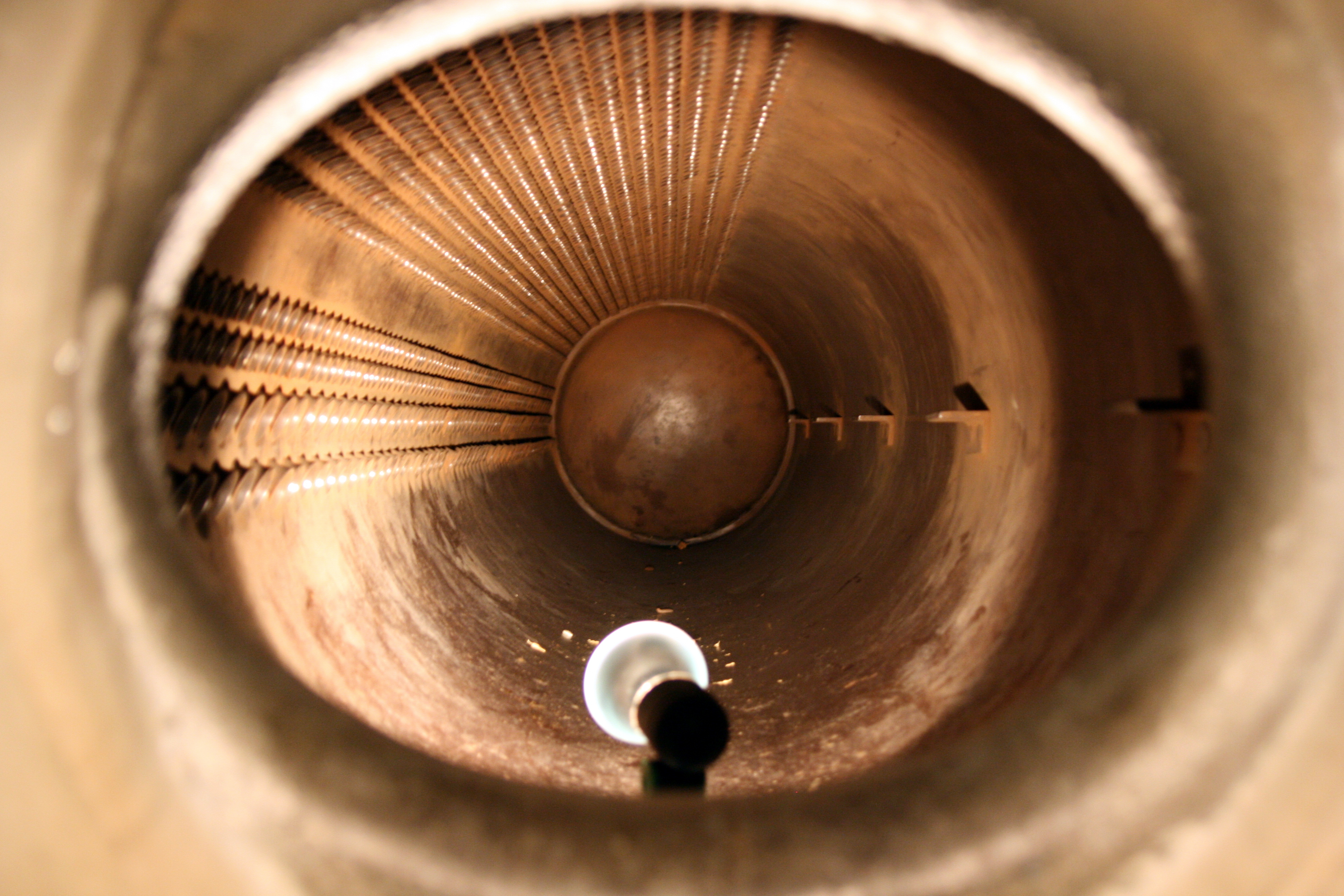
Inside a water drum, showing the tube ends

Thimble tube
A form of water-tube where the tube is single-ended; predecessor to the field tube
Thermic siphon
Three-drum boiler
A generic term for water-tube boilers of the Yarrow pattern. In Royal Navy practice, a reference to the specific Admiralty example of this.
Throatplate
a plate forming the lower front of the outer firebox of a locomotive boiler, below the barrel.
Top-feed
in locomotive boilers, a feed water check valve placed on the top of the boiler drum. This encourages rapid mixing of the cold feedwater with the hot steam, reducing the risk of thermal shock to the heated parts of the boiler.
Tubeplate
a plate across the barrel of a fire-tube boiler, containing many small holes to receive the fire-tubes. A locomotive boiler has two tubeplates: one at the front of the inner firebox (firebox tubeplate) and one at the front of the boiler, adjacent to the smokebox (smokebox tubeplate).
Vacuum valve
A non-return valve allowing atmospheric air into the boiler, if a cold boiler reduces its internal pressure on cooling down. This avoids the risk of damage to some types, if their pressure loads are reversed. Few boilers are fitted with these, although the feedwater clack valve usually has a similar effect.
Vertical boiler
Water-level
Water-wall
a furnace or other wall within a boiler enclosure that is composed of numerous closely set water-tubes. These tubes may be either bare, or covered by a mineral cement.
Washout plug
A small mudhole used for washing out the boiler. Plugs, as compared to mudholes, are usually screwed into a taper thread, rather than held by clamps.
Water drum
see mud drum
Water-tube boiler
a boiler whose primary heating surface is composed of many small tubes, filled with water. Tubes of 3 inch diameter and above are termed "large-tube" boilers. Later water-tube designs used smaller "small-tubes" of 2 inches or less.
Wet bottom furnace

== See also ==
- List of boiler types, by manufacturer
- Steam locomotive components
