= AD700 =

The AD700 technology initiative began in the early 1990s with the idea of developing a range of advanced materials that would permit the raising of main and reheat steam temperatures in pulverized fuel boilers up to 700 °C (1,292 °F) and beyond.

== Key features and benefits ==
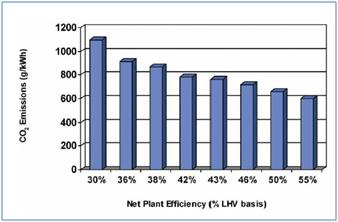
Graph showing relationship between power plant efficiency and carbon dioxide emissions. As efficiency increases, specific carbon dioxide emissions decrease from 1100 g/kWh at 30% net plant efficiency to 650 g/kWh at 50% efficiency. This equates to a reduction in carbon dioxide emissions of 41%. Coal consumption is similarly reduced and clearly illustrates the benefits of efficiency increase with regard to potential environmental protection.

- Reduced fuel costs due to improved plant efficiency
- Significant reduction in CO_{2} emissions
- Excellent availability, comparable with that of existing subcritical plant
- Excellent part-load efficiency and flexibility
- Reduced NO_{x}, SO_{x} and particulate emissions - supporting the European commitments for emission reduction made in the Kyoto Treaty
- Compatibility with biomass co-firing
- Possible full integration with CO_{2} capture technology options.

== Research & development programme ==
A major R and D program was established comprising six phases of effort that started with a conceptual feasibility study at the beginning of 1998. The table below shows a breakdown of the six phases.

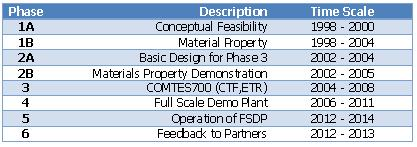
AD700 development programme

It was recognized that high-temperature materials were the key to the successful development of AD700 technology. Due to the extended timescales required for materials testing, validation and qualification the programme was launched with Phase 1 comprising a conceptual feasibility study (Phase 1A) and an investigation of materials property requirements (Phase 1B).

Phase 1 of the program attracted 40 participants from 10 European power generators, manufactures of power plant equipment, and material suppliers. The program was industry-focused and funded in-part by the European Commission.

Following near completion of Phase 1A, Phase 2 was initiated in 2001 with 34 participants from across Europe. Phase 2A focused on taking forward a number of boiler design concepts, while Phase 2B continued the laboratory testing and evaluation of new high temperature materials. By 2004, the third phase, entitled COMTES 700, was progressing with the aim of pilot-scale testing of key power plant components at a commercial scale.

The Phase 4 pre-engineering study for a full-scale demonstration plant was scheduled for Autumn 2006.

== Boiler materials ==
In parallel with an ongoing R&D program aimed at the development of a high-temperature, solid-solution nickel alloy (Alloy 617) for application to both pipework and super-heater tubes, the AD700 program investigated precipitation-hardening nickel alloys (Alloy 263 and Alloy 740).

Collectively, this group of three alloys offers a range of new possibilities to the boiler designer. Alloy 617 was at the time considered to be the easiest to fabricate as it does not require a precipitation-hardening heat treatment, while the precipitation Alloys 263 and 740 offer superior creep and corrosion resistance respectively.

The high cost of nickel, however, prohibits its extensive use in tubes, and so the boiler materials program also set out to develop a high-temperature austenitic steel with average stress rupture properties of 100 MPa following 100,000 hours operation at 700 °C. The austenitic material developed, Sanicro 25, has been successfully produced in commercial quantities and has undergone extensive testing as part of the phase 3 program.

== Turbine materials ==
As with the boiler materials group, the aims of the steam turbine materials group were:

- To identify suitable high temperature alloys
- To demonstrate prototype manufacture and welding
- To define properties and allowable stresses

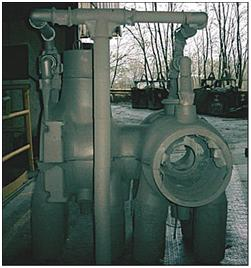
Alloy 617 Full Scale demonstration Valve produced by Goodwin Steel Castings Ltd (UK)

Most of the alloys investigated had previously been used in other industry sectors such as aerospace and gas turbines but required further development of AD700 technology application. Nickel-based Alloys 617 and 625 were the main candidates for many turbine components and their characterization in terms of creep, creep/fatigue crack growth, low cycle fatigue for castings, forgings and welds was successfully completed.

Candidate alloy test specimens for material testing were produced by Goodwin Steel Castings Ltd in alloys 263, 617, 625 and 155.

Due to difficulties experienced with the casting of Alloy 617, most of the effort has been focused on the casting of Alloy 625. After a selection period, then two full-scale demonstration valves were produced.

Both 617 and Alloy 625 have been successfully forged and considered suitable for HP and IP rotor forgings. Welded rotor manufacture will be a key feature of AD700 turbine technology. Prototype joints have been manufactured successfully by welding 10% chrome steel to the nickel-based alloy. Moving and stationary turbine blade production has been explored both by the machining and investment casting manufacturing methods. Bolting materials have been identified and characterized. Solid particle erosion is a known potential problem for turbine blades and the application of a protective coating has also been demonstrated.

== Boiler and turbine design ==
Within the boiler design activities, potential cost savings were identified by considering shortening the main and reheat steam lines using two novel arrangements. Firstly, a twin tower or inverse two-pass boiler design was considered, in which firing takes place in a first tower, with the hot combustion gases moving down and across to a second tower. The final super-heater and re-heater are arranged at the bottom of the second tower with outlet headers located close to the turbine. The arrangement minimizes the thermal movement between boiler and steam lines providing a significant reduction in the length of steam piping to 25 m and 30 m for each string of 400 MW reference plant. As an alternative arrangement, a horizontal boiler concept, designed with the outlet headers on top of the boiler was considered. The low height boiler design arrangement resulted in a similar shortening of the steam lines to around 35 m to 40 m for each string of a 400 MW reference plant.

In total, 10 boiler concepts with different boiler arrangements (tower type, two-pass, inverse twin tower and horizontal furnace), different power outputs (400 MWe net, 1,000 MWe gross), different process cycles (single reheat, double reheat) and different firing systems (tangential firing, opposed wall firing) have been investigated. Turbine designs are based on relatively conventional turbine architectures to ensure high levels of reliability. In order to minimize the use of nickel alloy components, reduce cost, and accommodate the limited supply capacity, new turbine designs will incorporate welded rotors and castings, with nickel alloys restricted to the highest temperature regions only.

== Phase 3 - COMTES 700 ==
The basis of the current phase of AD700 program, COMTES 700, is a general technical concept for a Component Test Facility (CTF) which allows the testing of plant components at an affordable cost.

COMTES 700, started in 2003, represents the third phase of the AD700 program and is an agreement between a group of suppliers and generators on the requirements of a comprehensive testing program for materials, financing possibilities and political constraints. The overall objective of the project was the design, manufacture, erection and operation of a facility that allows the testing of the following plant components.

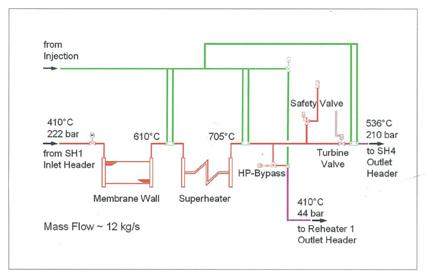
Flow diagram of the component test facility

The above image is a flow diagram of the CTF which is installed in the coal-fired power plant Scholven F located in Gelsenkirchen (Germany. The steam flow of 2,200 t/h produces a net output capacity of 676 MW. The steam for the testing purpose of the CTF (12 kg/s) is taken from the inlet header of the superheater (SH1) and is led to the evaporator panel, where it is heated to 600 °C (1,112 °F). Steam is further heated in the test superheater to 705 °C before entering either the high-pressure bypass test valve or being cooled and mixed with the main superheater steam (SH 4). In the first case, the steam, after leaving the high-pressure bypass test valve is cooled and passed through the re-heater (RH 1) outlet header.

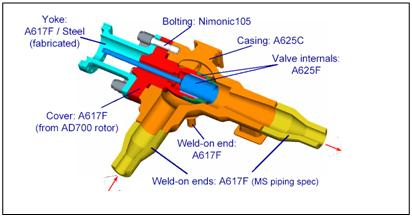
Turbine inlet valve

The component test facility (including the Goodwin alloy 625 valve) is installed in the coal-fired power plant “Scholven F” located in Gelsenkirchen (Germany). The valve casting has been in service operating at 705 °C (1,301 °F), and in 2009 was taken offline for performance inspection after 20,000 hr operation.

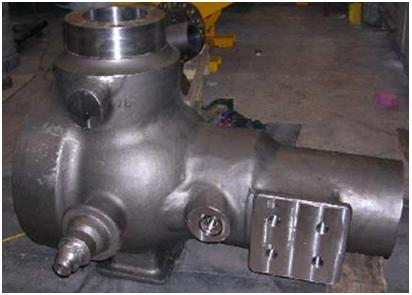
Fully machined Alloy 625 turbine inlet valve casting produced by Goodwin Steel Castings Ltd (UK)

The extended testing of key components is to enable performance data (manufacturing, bending and welding) to be gathered on a range of advanced materials including T24, HCm12, TP310 N, HR3c, Alloy 714, Alloy 617 and Alloy 740. The test program of approximately 20,000 operating hours will provide data on:

- In-plant monitoring
- Determination and evaluation of residual service life
- In-service inspection
- Operational testing of Ni-based alloys for tubes, pipes and valves
- Gathering of information on magnetite layer on the rib on internal rifled tubes
- Assessment of the operational behavior of all components
- Determination of flue gas corrosion and steam oxidation behavior of the materials
- Determination of erosion effects due to soot blowing

The test results from CTF operation will be evaluated.

The driving force behind the COMTES 700 project was a grouping of European power generators collectively known as the EMAX Power Plant Initiative. From this group a consortium was formed to support the project with a substantial financial contribution. Members of this consortium are EDF (France), Electrabel (Belgium), Elsam (Denmark), EnBW (Germany), PPC (Greece), RWE (Germany) and Vattenfall (Sweden/Germany). The project is steered by the COMTES700-partners consortium and co-ordinated by VGB.

== Project participants ==
The AD700 program overall has involved numerous participants from across Europe. They include companies specializing in the supply and development of power plant equipment, material testing institutes and major utilities.

=== Participants ===
The AD700 Program Phase 2 project participants are listed below:

- Tech-wise A/s
- ALSTOM (Switzerland) Ltd
- ALSTOM Power Boiler GmbH
- ALSTOM Power Ltd
- ALSTOM Power
- Ansaldo Caldaie
- Ansaldo Ricerche
- Babcock-Hitachi Europe GmbH
- BOHLER Edelstahl GmbH & Co KG
- Burmeister & Wain Energy A/S
- Centro Sviluppo Materiali S.p.A.
- CESI Spa
- Doncasters FVC Ltd
- EDF R&D
- EDF-SEPTEN
- Eindhoven University of Technology
- ENEA CRF
- Energi E2 A/S
- EPPSA
- Fortum Power and Heat Oy
- Goodwin Steel Castings Ltd
- GRUPO EDP - Electricidade de Portugal
- Holter Regelarmaturen Gmb & Co KG
- KEMA Nederland B.V
- Mitsui Babcock Energy Limited
- RWE Power AG
- Saarschmiede GmbH
- Sempell AG
- Siemens Aktiengesellschaft
- Technip Germany GmbH
- VGB PowerTech e.V.
- VOEST-ALPINE GIESSEREI LINZ GmbH
- VOEST-APLINE GIESSEREI TRAISEN GmbH.

== Conclusions ==
The development of a 700 °C steam power plant to operate on coal in combination with biomass will enable a reduction of CO_{2} emissions of around 40% compared with the most advanced USC power plants operating today. This will bring the emissions from a combined coal-biomass fired 700 °C power plant close to the figures of gas-fired combined cycle plants. The 700 °C steam power plant offers a flexible technology with minimized CO_{2}-emission based on coal - the most reliable energy source in the world. Further, it gives the demanded production flexibility in order to stabilize a grid with a high amount of unpredictable renewable energy input. The technical realization of a 700 °C steam power plant depends on a successful development and qualification of advanced ferritic, austenitic and Ni- based alloys. With respect to austenitic and Ni-based alloys, promising results have been achieved. The economic criterion for the realization of a 700 °C steam power plant is a realistic budget price. The consumption of large quantities of expensive Ni -based alloys has significant influence in this respect, and a successful development of an improved ferritic steel to be used at temperatures up to 650 °C would improve the situation.
