= Pulverised fuel =

Articles on pulverised fuel include:

- Coal dust
- Pulverized coal-fired boiler
- Pulverised fuel ash
- Pulverised fuel firing
- Pulverizer
