= Field-tube boiler =

Type of water boiler

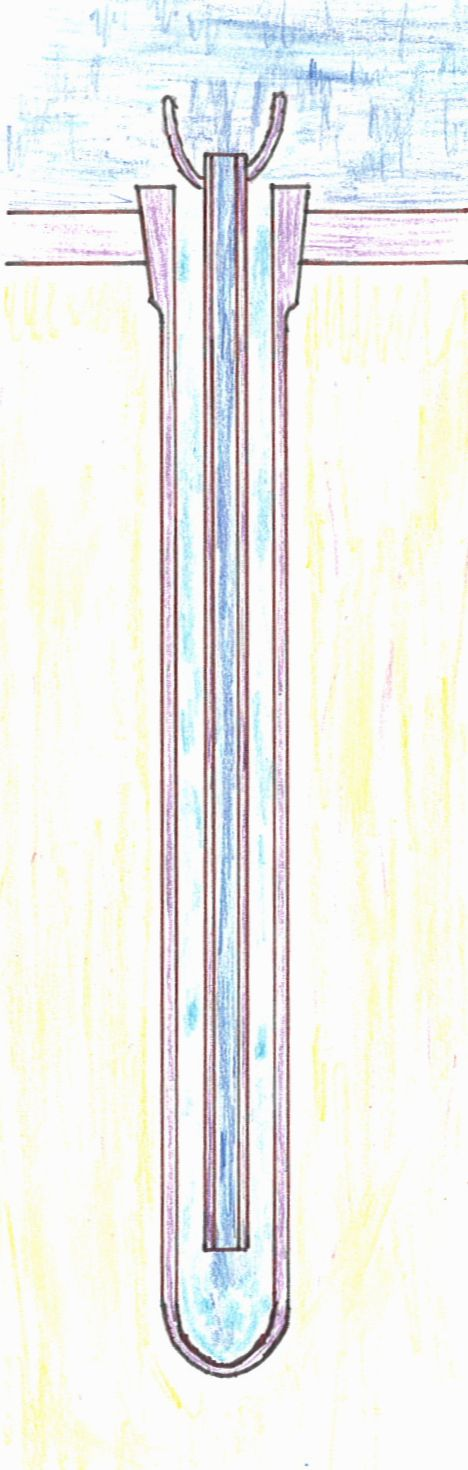
Field tube, sectioned

A Field-tube boiler (also known as a bayonet tube) is a form of water-tube boiler where the water tubes are single-ended. The tubes are closed at one end, and they contain a concentric inner tube. Flow is thus separated into the colder inner flow down the tube and the heated flow upwards through the outer sleeve. As Field tubes are thus dependent on thermo-syphon flow within the tube, they must thus always have some vertical height to encourage the flow. In most designs they are mounted near-vertically, to encourage this.

They are named after Edward Field, their inventor, and were originally developed for steam fire-engines where speed of raising steam was important. More recently, Field-tube boilers have been most widely used by French manufacturers, either for small vertical boilers, or as a marine boiler. The use of this type of Field tube has also been researched for the transfer of heat from nuclear reactors, vacuum condensers and heat exchangers.

The thimble-tube boiler has some similarities, in that its water-tubes are also single-ended. The simpler thimble tube does not have the inner tube of the field-tube, therefore its flow is mixed, turbulent and dependent on random boiling. For this reason, thimble tubes can only be short, so are used in large numbers, and usually horizontally as their flow is not coherent enough to benefit from a gravity gradient. Field tubes are however more complex and expensive to manufacture. Field-tube boilers therefore use fewer and longer tubes (giving the same heating area for a reduced number of tubes).

Field-tubes are always submerged, i.e. the upper end of the tube is mounted into the boiler below the water level, otherwise flow into the cold side of the tube cannot be replenished.

The principal advantage claimed for Field-tube boilers is that there are none of the expansion problems experienced in boilers with simple tubes. Secondly, as Field-tubes are connected from just one end, their replacement and maintenance is simpler.

One drawback of the field-tube is a tendency for mud and scale to accumulate in the bottom of the tube, potentially blocking circulation. The closed tube ends are also difficult to wash out. Providing an excessive dead space there as a mud reservoir would have poor circulation, thus risking local overheating. Efforts must thus be made to ensure that all tubes are equally heated and that all have strong circulation within them, encouraging enough flow to scour the tubes free of sludge.

== Field-tubes as thermic syphons ==
Where a simple vertical boiler requires additional heating surface, particularly where this is directly exposed to the furnace so as to raise steam more rapidly, field-tubes may be installed in the roof of the firebox, almost down to the level of the firebed. They thus act as a form of thermic syphon. As they are only mounted at one end and are free to expand in the heat, many of the usual expansion problems of thermic syphons are avoided. To encourage adequate circulation though, tubes should not be closer than 30° to horizontal, and longer tubes may need to be steeper than this.

== De Poray boiler ==
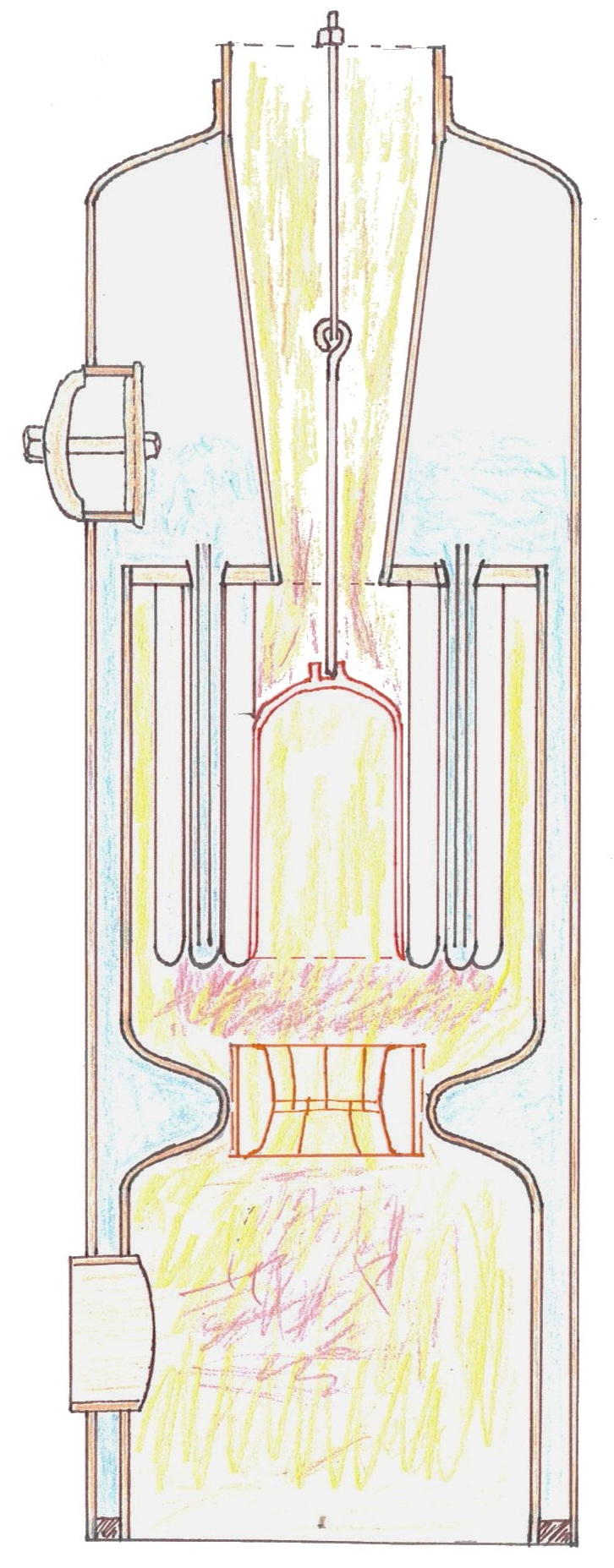
De Poray boiler, sectioned

The De Poray boiler is French in origin. Its defining characteristic is its patented double combustion chamber, intended to increase combustion efficiency, thus reducing fuel costs and smoke emissions. The secondary chamber is mounted adjacent to the first and consists of a refractory ring of reduced diameter to the first combustion chamber. This ring is heated by radiation from primary combustion, thus maintaining a high temperature. Any unburned combustion gases leaving the first chamber are heated by this incandescent ring and together with the supply of secondary air are encouraged to ignite.

In the vertical form of the De Poray boiler, the main heating surface is composed of vertical Field tubes in this secondary combustion chamber. A steel radiation bell is hung in the centre of the chamber, beneath the outlet flue, and the combustion gases are directed to pass over this, heating it. Heating of the tubes themselves is partly by convection from the gases, partly by indirect re-radiation from this heated bell. This permits a lower operating temperature for the tubes, also a more even heating. This is claimed by the makers to encourage more uniform boiling within the tube, thus faster steam-raising.

An unusual feature of this boiler is that the field tubes are not rigidly attached to the boiler shell, but merely gasketed into place. The thickened ends of the tubes are formed to a taper and the tubeplate holes are reamed to match. A paper gasket is sufficient to seal the joint. Inspection or removal for replacement is thus simplified. As the boiler is always under greater pressure than the atmosphere, the tubes self-tighten under pressure and avoid leaking. Obviously the boiler must never be placed under vacuum, so a vacuum valve may need to be provided.

== Niclausse boiler ==
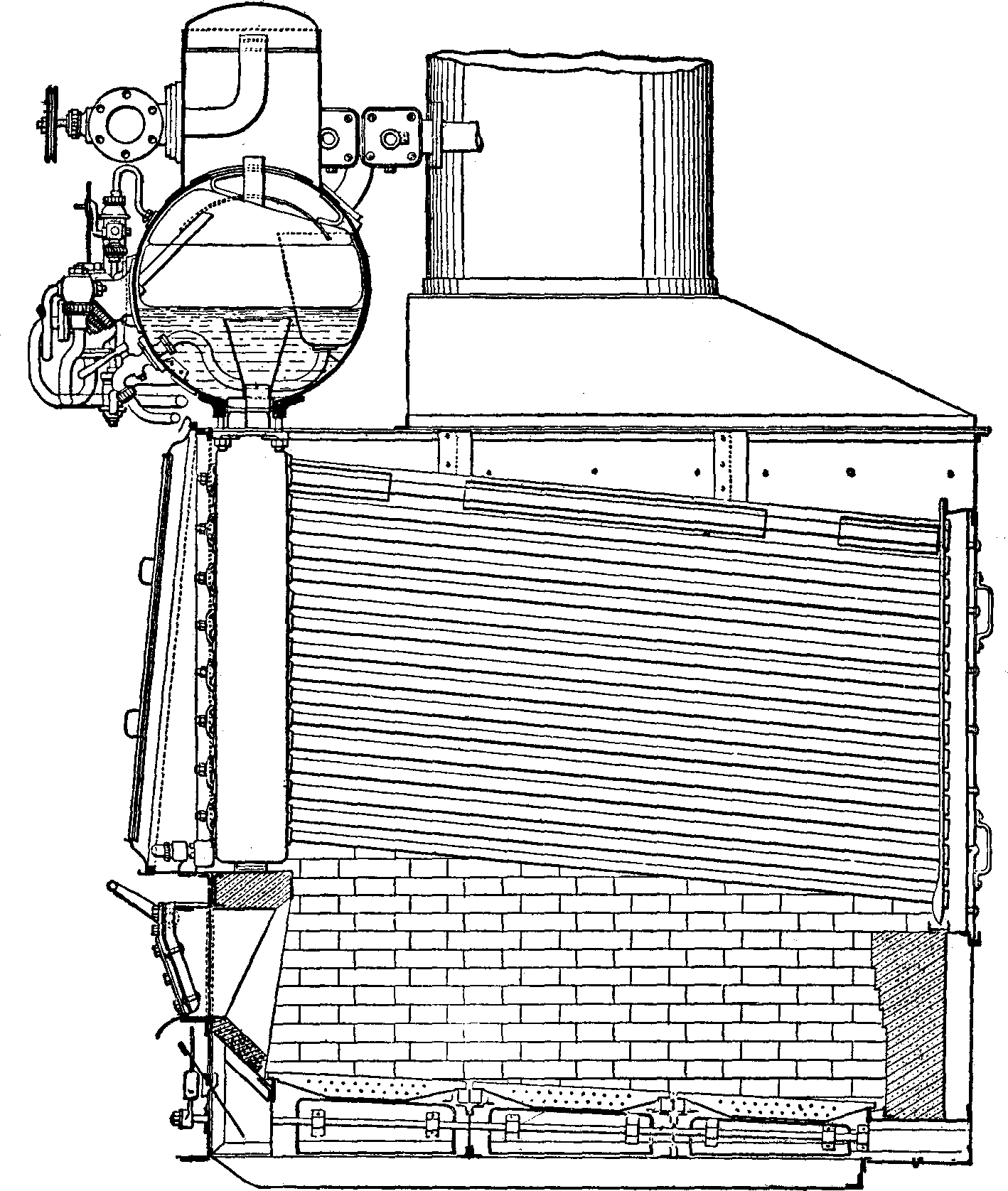
Niclausse boiler, from the 1911 Encyclopædia Britannica

The Niclausse boiler is another French design, used for both land and marine use. It uses long Field tubes set at a shallow angle to the horizontal, as per the Babcock & Wilcox boiler. These Field tubes are linked into vertical sets by headers at their upper end. This header is a double pipe, with two sections linking the inner and outer waterspaces separately. Above the boiler and outside the flue gas enclosure, a steam-and-water drum links these headers together.

It was notably used in some of the last pre-dreadnought battleships (circa 1900) of the French, Italian, Russian and British navies. The USS Georgia (BB-15) built by the Bath Iron Works in Maine and her launching in October 1904 with steam provided by twenty-four coal-fired Niclausse Boilers.

Although performance of this boiler has been good, washout is difficult and sludge build-up can be a problem. With careful design and regular maintenance the type gained a reputation for reliability and the quick replacement of a failed tube, which made it suitable for naval practice, less so for commercial use. Niclausse boilers gave poor fuel economy when coupled with turbines operating at low speed, in addition to copious quantities of smoke and sparks. As such, they fell out of favor for naval shipbuilding once steam turbines became commonplace (see Danton class battleship for example).

=== Dürr boiler ===
A very similar type, used in German warships, was the Dürr boiler. This did not use sectional headers, but single chambers.

By 1901, the Royal Navy had ordered eight Dürr boilers from Germany, to be installed as a trial on board the Marathon-class cruiser HMS Medusa.

== See also ==
- Clarkson thimble tube boiler
