= Priming (steam locomotive) =

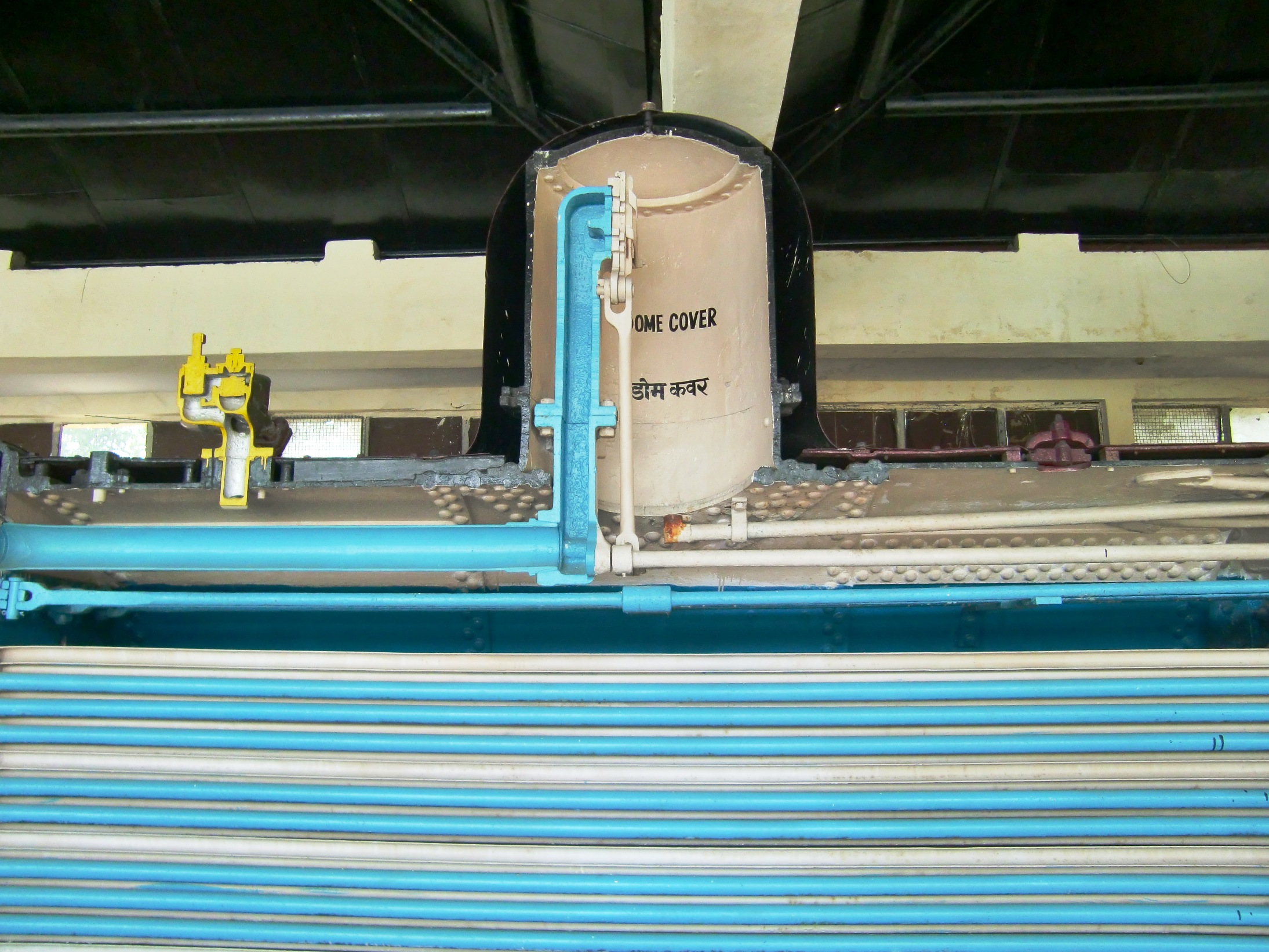
The regulator is placed high in the dome of a boiler, as the best location to avoid priming.

Priming is a condition in the boiler of a steam locomotive in which water is carried over into the steam delivery. It may be caused by impurities in the water, which foams up as it boils, or simply too high a water level. It is harmful to the valves and pistons, as lubrication is washed away, and can be dangerous as any water collecting in the cylinders is not compressible and if trapped may fracture the cylinder head or piston.

== Causes ==
The most frequent cause is running the locomotive with too high a level of water in the boiler and is most apparent when the regulator is opened sharply or steam demand is high. Thus, sensible locomotive management by the operators will help to prevent the occurrence. The phenomenon is particularly evident in areas of impure water, where boiled water creates a foam, or a mist of droplets, filling the space that collects steam at the top of the boiler, to be drawn down the steam collector pipe in the form of slugs of water. If boiler water is condensed and re-used, any oil or grease must be extracted as this form of contamination is particularly likely to give trouble.

== Remedy ==
Early designers fitted curved sheets below the steam collector pipe, but these were not successful as the whole of the steam space could contain foam. In districts where the feed water is unsuitable, blowdown valves ("scum valves"), either continuously working while the regulator is open or operated in conjunction with the boiler feed, are fitted. Valves at water level reduce surface scum; those towards the bottom of the boiler help remove precipitated solids. Other forms of prevention include the chemical treatment of water before it enters the boiler. In the event of priming (and also when steam is admitted through cold piping or into a cold cylinder) the operators need to open the cylinder cocks, which are designed to release trapped water. Once occurring, the problem can affect the level indicated in the boiler's gauge glass and for this reason is difficult to put right without reducing the water level to the extent that the firebox crown becomes dangerously exposed.

== See also ==
- Carryover with steam
