= Carryover with steam =

Carryover with steam refers to transport of moisture and impurities with steam.

Moisture carryover with steam is quantified by the mass flow rate of liquid water per mass flow rate of steam. In boilers producing saturated steam, it is typically about 0.1% but may increase with fouling and boiler impurities.

The carryover of impurities (for example, sodium, chloride, copper, silica) with steam can be divided into two parts:

- mechanical carryover of the impurity with liquid water droplets entrained with the steam, and
- vaporous carryover of the impurity in steam.

The total carryover is the sum of the two. Vaporous carryover generally increases with increasing steam pressure. In low pressure boilers, mechanical carryover prevails, possibly with the exception of more volatile impurities, such as silica.

Impurity carryover can cause corrosion and fouling of steam turbines, reheaters, and superheaters.

== See also ==
- Priming (steam locomotive)
