= Steam separator =

Device for separating water droplets from steam

A steam separator, sometimes called a moisture separator or steam drier, is a device for separating water droplets from steam. The simplest type of steam separator is the steam dome on a steam locomotive. Stationary boilers and nuclear reactors may have more complex devices that impart a "spin" to the steam so that water droplets are thrown outwards by centrifugal force and collected. All separators require steam traps to collect the water droplets that they remove.

It is important to remove water droplets from steam because:

- In all engines, wet steam reduces the thermal efficiency
- In piston engines, water can accumulate in the cylinders and cause a hydraulic lock which will damage the engine
- In thermal power stations, water droplets in high velocity steam coming from nozzles (or vanes) in a steam turbine can impinge on and erode turbine internals such as turbine blades.
- In other steam-using industrial machinery, water can accumulate in piping and cause steam hammer: a form of water hammer caused by water build up 'plugging' a pipe then being accelerated by the steam flowing through the pipe until it reaches a sharp bend and results in catastrophic failure of the pipe.

A steam drier is also sometimes applied to a drier that operates as a low-temperature superheater, adding heat to the steam.

== Applications ==
- Atomizers
- Boilers
- Catalyzing systems
- Cooking processes using a steamer
- Engines
- Other steam systems
- Rubber vulcanizing machines
- Steam-powered irons
- Turbines

== See also ==
- Steam dryer, a device for drying another material, such as laundry or a biomass fuel, with the use of hot steam, rather than for drying steam.

== Sources ==
- Nuclear Encyclopedia article;
- Separators and their Role in the Steam System
