= Wet bottom furnace =

A Wet-bottom furnace or wet-bottom boiler is boiler that contains a wet bottom furnace. It is a kind of boiler used for pulverised fuel firing. In wet bottom boilers, the bottom ash is kept in a molten state and tapped off as a liquid. Wet bottom boiler slag is the molten condition ash as it is drawn from the bottom of the slag-tap or cyclone furnaces. An advantage is the fact that the end product in this process has a higher value compared to that of a dry bottom boiler. Wet bottom boilers are preferred for low volatile coals that produce a lot of ash. But it has higher investment costs and higher maintenance costs, so it is built less often.

== Wet-bottom boilers ==
1. Slag-tap boiler, burns pulverized coal. 50 percent of the ash is retained in the furnace as boiler slag.
2. Cyclone boiler, burns crushed coal. 70 to 80 percent of the ash is retained as boiler slag. The rest of the ash leaves as fly ash.

If the ash fusion temperature is less than the furnace temperature then that type of furnace is called a wet bottom furnace.

== Steps in the process ==
1. Both boiler types have a solid base with an orifice that can be opened to permit the molten ash that has collected at the base to flow into the ash hopper below.
2. The ash hopper in wet-bottom furnaces contains quenching water.
3. When the molten slag comes in contact with the quenching water, it fractures instantly, crystallizes, and forms pellets.
4. The resulting boiler slag, often referred to as “black beauty,” is a coarse, hard, black, angular, glassy material.
5. At intervals, high-pressure water jets wash the boiler slag from the hopper pit into a sluiceway which is then conveys it to a collection basin for dewatering, possible crushing or screening, and either disposal or reuse.
