= Thimble tube boiler =

Type of steam boiler

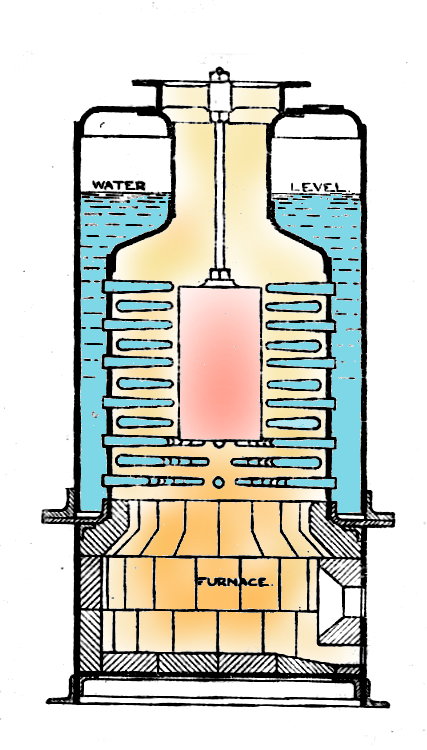
Thimble tube boiler

A thimble tube boiler is a form of steam boiler, usually provided as an auxiliary boiler or heat-recovery boiler. They are vertical in orientation and would be considered a form of water-tube boiler.

== Description ==
The characteristic feature of this boiler are its 'thimble tubes'. These are short horizontal water tubes, closed at one end and tapered. They are thus similar to the field-tube boiler, which also uses single-ended closed tubes, but with important differences. The field-tube boiler uses downward-pointing vertical tubes and these also have an internal tube. This extra tube segregates the flow into a central cold downcomer and an upwelling outer flow of heated water and boiling steam. In the thimble tube, there is no such segregation and so boiling is a random process with flow back and forth along the tube.

The thimble tube boiler was developed after experiments by Thomas Clarkson and is still firmly associated with the Clarkson firm as a maker. Other makers also produced them in smaller quantities. Niven of Newcastle upon Tyne were granted a patent in 1935, some decades after Clarkson began manufacture, for a relatively small improvement.

As boiling is random, the boiler is limited in both its evaporative capacity and also its maximum furnace temperature. However the boiler can offer a large heating area in a small volume, costs comparatively little to construct relative to this area and is also accessible for cleaning. Accordingly, the boiler was not generally used as a primary steam power generator but typically as a donkey boiler supporting secondary or hotel services, particularly on-board ships.

The boilers were also mostly used as heat-recovery boilers, from the exhausts of large marine diesel engines, as these operated at a lower temperature than a direct-fired boiler. Some were equipped as composite boilers, heated by exhaust gases when under way or with oil-firing when in port.

== Construction ==
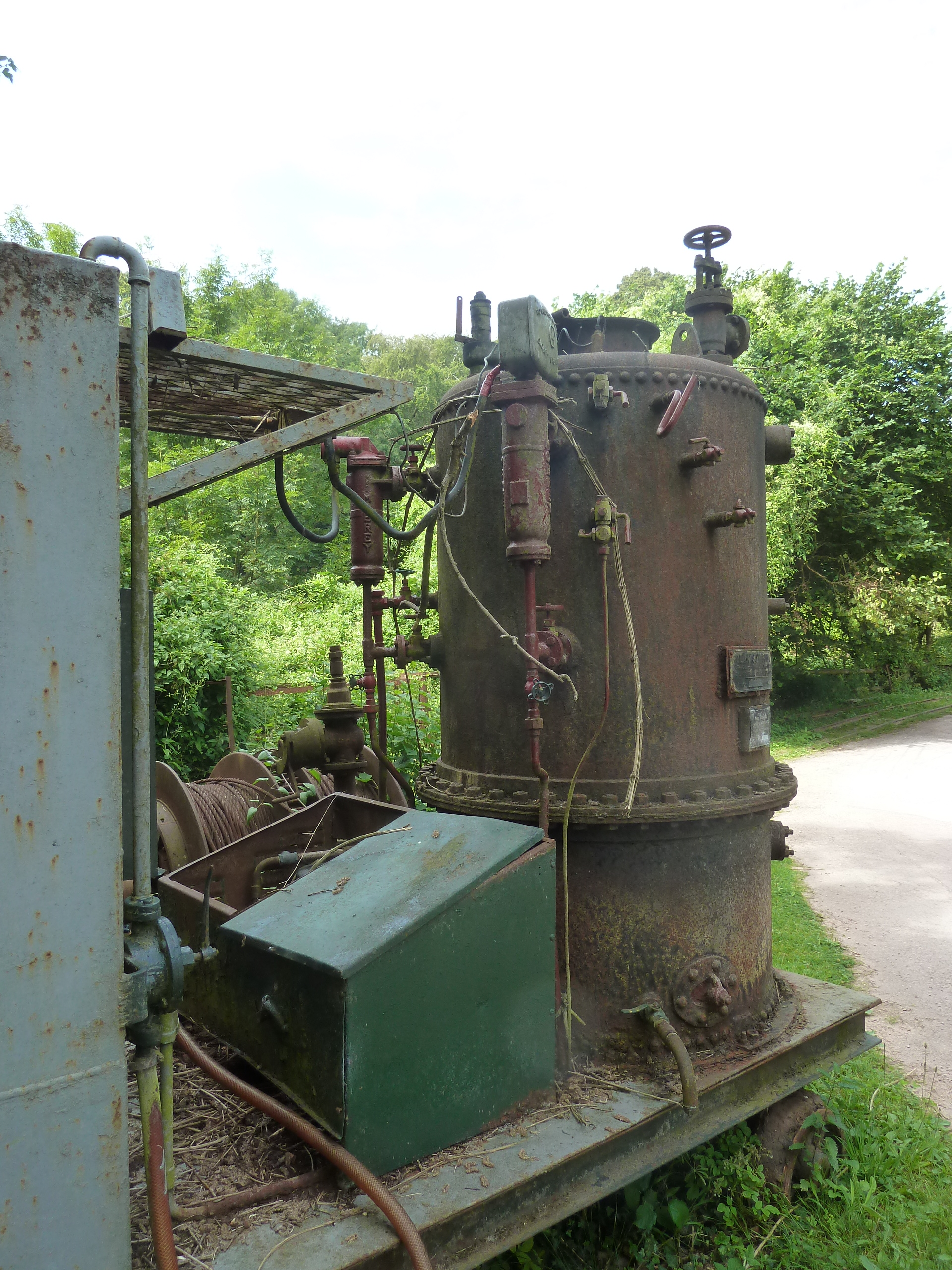
Derelict boiler at Clearwell Caves. Note the bolted joint to allow the boiler shell to be dismantled for cleaning. The green box encloses the electric fan for an oil spray burner. The two vertical cylinders are Mobrey automatic water-level valves controlling the feedwater level.

Thimble tube boilers require horizontal tubes to permit their variable boiling flow, thus the boiler shells are constructed as vertical boilers. The majority have a large vertical central flue, with the thimble tubes protruding into it from a surrounding water jacket. These thimble tubes are formed by deep drawing of steel – a process that was not available in Victorian times, but that became a cheap means of production once available. Hot gas enters from beneath and exits from the top of the boiler. To improve gas flow over the tubes, a series of horizontal disks are lowered into the central space on a rod or chain, forcing gas flow radially outwards, over the tubes. Cleaning these inward-pointing thimbles could be difficult. A 1954 patent by Clarksons describes a boiler shell with a sliding shutter on the outside to access the central flue.

An alternate form had a central water tank with outward-pointing thimbles, surrounded by a dry sheet metal casing. These were somewhat less efficient owing to heat losses through the casing, but were more accessible for tube cleaning. These were used for industrial heat recovery, with dirty flue gases. A minor drawback to the thimble tube is that although the outer fire side of the thimble is easy to clean, the inner water-side is difficult or impossible. Any scale build-up here must be removed at 'eggshell thickness' before it becomes impossible.

Where the boiler was arranged for composite firing, the central flue version was used with oil firing. Fired boilers sometimes included vertical water-tubes of more conventional form as well, to improve circulation. There could even be cross-tubes, as for the common vertical cross-tube boiler. A common form for ships had both inner and outer flues, with separate gas circuits for each; the inner used for oil firing and the outer for exhaust heat-recovery. This avoided problems of exhaust blowback into the oil-fired flue. Another composite form for ships used two boilers: one of minimal form with a central flue, used as a silencer economizer for the diesel engines, and another as a purely oil-fired central flue boiler. The economizer was used with pumped circulation (as it was usually mounted high up) as a feedwater heater. This system was used where a large amount of steam was required even when in port, such as for heated cargoes like banana boats and passenger liners.

A typical boiler could be 7 feet (2.1 m) diameter and 18 feet (5.5 m) high

== Applications ==
The major use was from the first diesel motorships, through to the present day. Many ship systems, from steam winches and cranes through to domestic heating and the heating of bunker oil as a fuel oil, use steam, produced by such an auxiliary boiler.

One rare use of the thimble tube boiler as a directly fired power generator was an experiment fitting to Leyland steam wagons in 1920. This coke-fired boiler was 2 feet (0.61 m) diameter by 2.75 feet (0.84 m) height and has 128 tubes. The following year, Clarkson exhibited their own 3 ton steam wagon in the Commercial Motor exhibition at Olympia.
