= Goodwin plc =

English heavy engineering firm

- Type: Public limited company
- Traded as: LSE: GDWN
- Industry: Engineering
- Founded: 1883
- Founder: Ralph Goodwin
- Headquarters: Stoke on Trent, England, UK
- Key people: T. J. W. Goodwin (Chairman); M. S. Goodwin (Managing Director, Mechanical Engineering); S. R. Goodwin (Managing Director, Refractory Engineering)
- Products: Machined steel castings
- Services: Bespoke heavy engineering
- Revenue: ▲£68.9 million (2026)
- Operating income: ▼£9.9 million (2026)
- Net income: ▲£57.9 million (2026)
- Website: www.goodwin.co.uk

Goodwin plc is a heavy engineering firm located in Stoke-on-Trent, Staffordshire, England. It specialises in the supply and fabrication of castings. The firm is listed on the London Stock Exchange and is a constituent of the FTSE 250 Index.

Founded as R. Goodwin & Sons in 1883, the company has long been a specialist in mechanical and refractory engineering. Throughout the twentieth centuries, it secured multiple licences from other firms, facilitating the production of materials such as ductile iron and cast Hastelloy® (super nickel alloys). The firm became a limited company, R. Goodwin & Sons (Engineers) Ltd., on 11 October 1935; it was listed for the first time on the London Stock Exchange in 1958. Goodwin became the first steel foundry in the world to be awarded accreditation by the British Standards Institution to BS5750 (now ISO9001) for casting production during 1984.

During the late twentieth and early twenty-first centuries, the oil and gas industry was a major source of business for the firm; however, this went into a sharp decline in the 2010s. Goodwin's response was to diversify into other sectors, from the specialist polymer manufacturer Duvelco to high-performance radar antennas. During the mid 2020s, the company performed particularly well, leading to its entry into the FTSE 250 Index.

== History ==
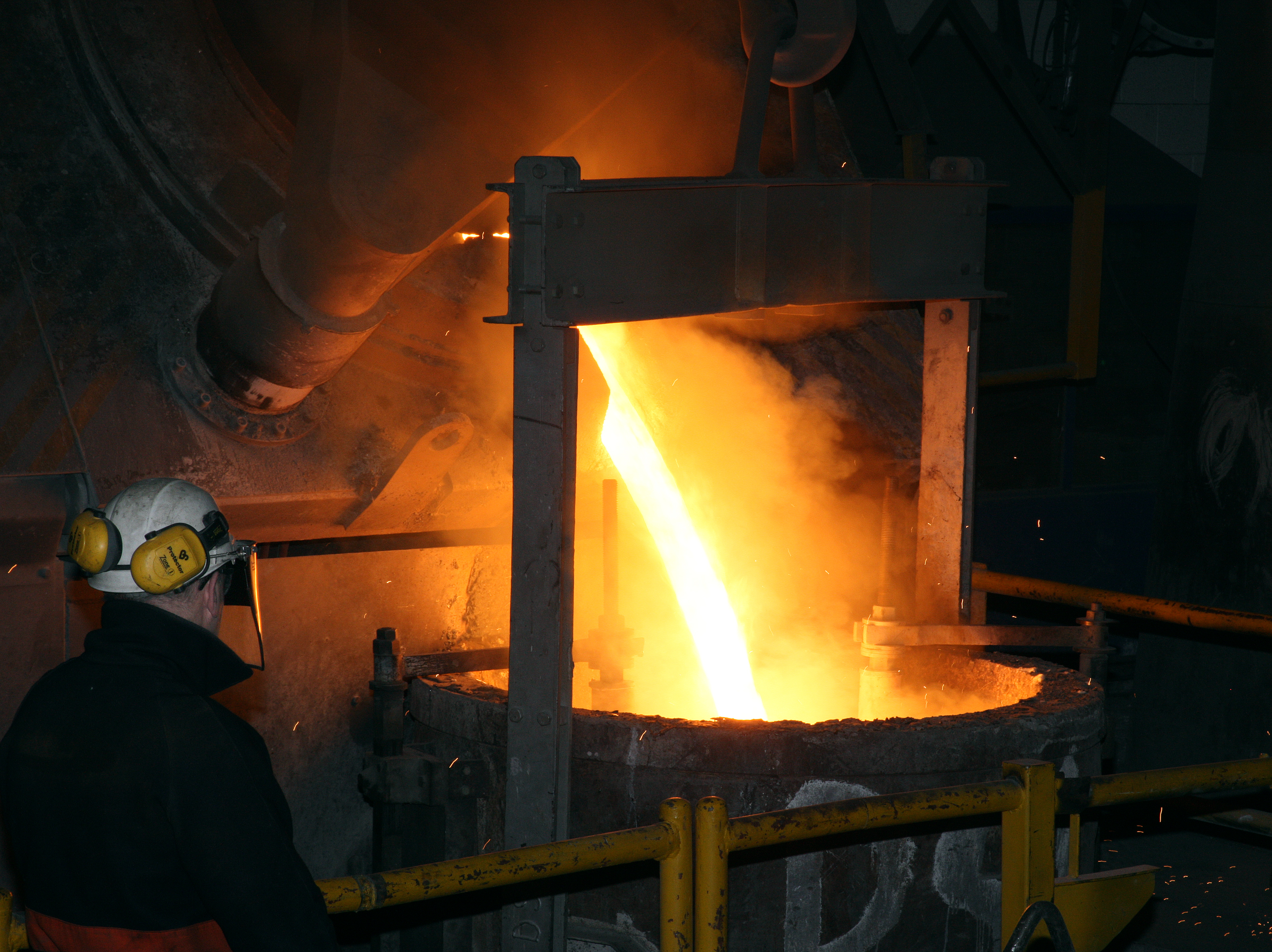
Pouring molten charge from the furnace into the ladle

The origins of the company can be traced back to the founding of R. Goodwin & Sons, an iron foundry and engineering business, in 1883. It was established by Ralph Goodwin and his sons. Originally operated as a partnership, it was converted into a limited company via the incorporation of R. Goodwin & Sons (Engineers) Ltd. on 11 October 1935. The firm developed itself into a specialist in mechanical and refractory engineering; the design and manufacture of metal components and mineral-based products that can retain their form and strength under extremely high temperatures.

During 1952, Goodwin secured a licence from the International Nickel Company that permitted them to produce ductile iron. Six years later, the company was listed for the first time on the London Stock Exchange; by the twenty-first century, it was one of the 10 oldest companies to be listed there. Despite its listing, the Goodwin family has long retained a sizable stake in the business.

In 1983, to mark the company's centenary, Goodwin was granted a coat of arms. One year later, it became the first steel foundry in the world to be awarded accreditation by the British Standards Institution to BS5750 (now ISO9001) for casting production. During 1986, Goodwin secured a licence from Langley alloys to produce Super Duplex Stainless Steel (Ferralium Alloy 255 3SC (UNS S32550)).

During 1990, Goodwins were granted an exclusive (to the UK) licence from Haynes International to produce cast Hastelloy (super nickel alloys). Two years later, it was awarded a "best practice" certificate for Computer Aided Methoding from the British Government's Energy Efficiency Office. In 1999, the firm was accredited to ISO14001 Environmental Management System.

In 2006, it was awarded the Queen's Award for International Trade. Two years later, the firm started supplying Caryophyllene for an American research programme.

During 2012, the company manufactured the world‘s largest super nickel alloy casting. That same year, Goodwin was criticised for its failure to comply with the requirements of the Financial Services Authority that it have non-executive directors on the board.

By the 2010s, the oil and gas sector comprised a substantial portion (as much as 50 percent for some years) of Goodwin's revenues and profits; the sector regularly used its high-spec large-scale valves. During 2014, oil prices crashed and the company's workload from the oil and gas sector sharply contracted, leading to some hardship over the following seven years for the firm's mechanical engineering division. Other than the oil and gas sector, other major end markets for the firm's products at this time included the defence, aerospace and mining sectors.

During 2016, Goodwin commenced the expansion of its original foundry site by 22 percent; this involved the creation of an engineered retaining wall. In early 2020, the company embarked on an expansion of its Stoke-on-Trent headquarters, which involves the addition of two extra levels at its Hanley site for more office space and the construction of a 60-space multi storey car park.

During the early 2020s, the company proceeded with a strategy of diversification. This included the building up of its radar subsidiary, which produces bespoke high-performance radar antennas and the creation of a new production line via its investment in Duvelco, a specialist polymer manufacturer. Other product areas included jewelry and fire suppression. During late 2024, it was announced that the mechanical engineering division had experienced a particularly strong year; this strong performance contributed to the firm joining the FTSE 250 Index that same year.

In August 2026, the company confirmed that it was considering selling a large part of its mechanical engineering division.

== Applications ==
Goodwin castings are used in a variety of projects. Some of the more high-profile projects are listed below:

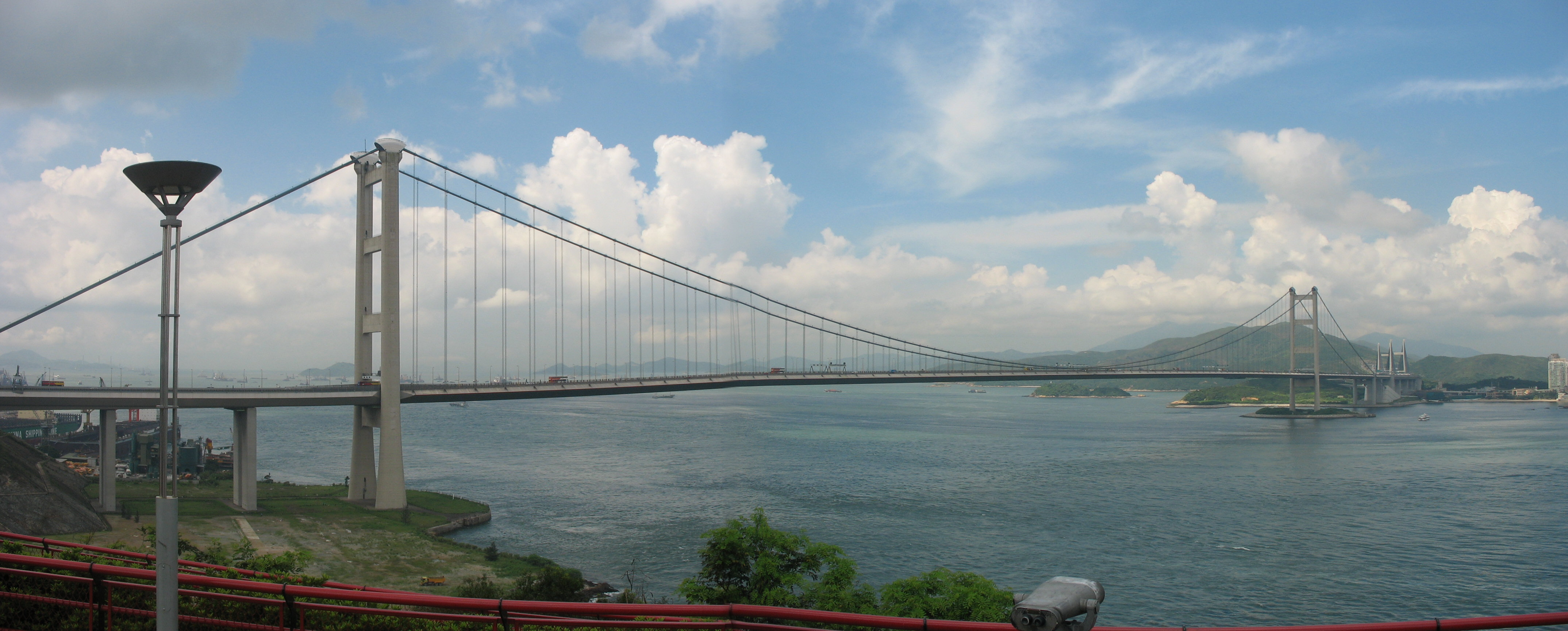
Tsing Ma Bridge – Hong Kong

=== Bridges ===
- Hardanger Bridge
- Oakland Bay Bridge Eastern Span Replacement
- Tsing Ma Bridge
- Jiangyin Yangtze River Bridge

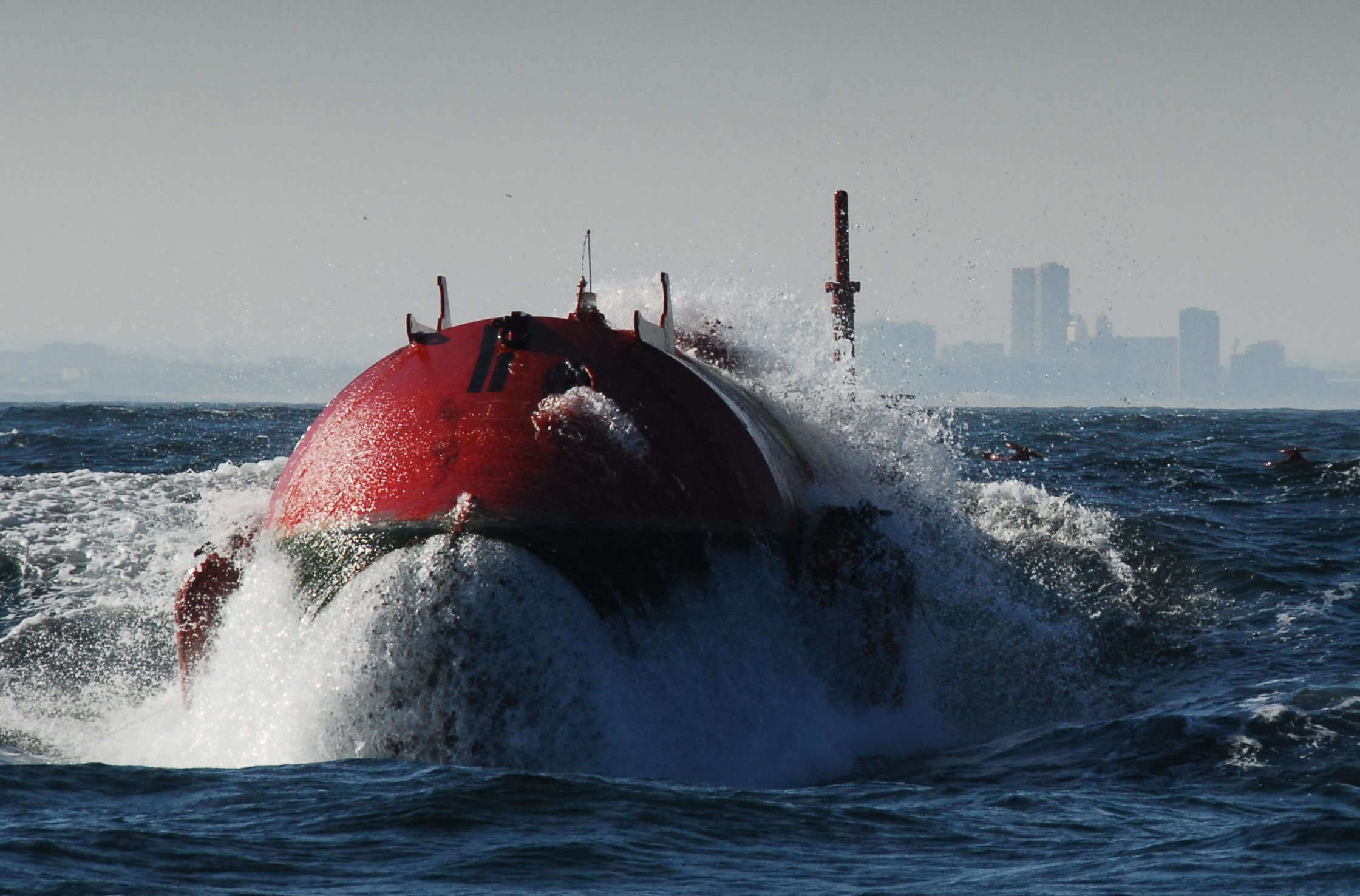
Pelamis Wave Energy Converter

=== Structural/Architectural ===
- Faslane Naval Base
- Stratford station
- Ludwig Erhard Haus, Börse Berlin
- Paddington station

=== Power Generation (including Nuclear) ===
- Pelamis Wave Energy Converter
- Sizewell B nuclear power station
- Sellafield re-processing plant
