= Pulverized coal-fired boiler =

Type of boiler

A pulverized coal-fired boiler is an industrial or utility boiler that generates thermal energy by burning pulverized coal (also known as powdered coal or coal dust since it is as fine as face powder in cosmetic makeup) that is blown into the firebox.

The basic idea of a firing system using pulverised fuel is to use the whole volume of the furnace for the combustion of solid fuels. Coal is ground to the size of a fine grain, mixed with air and burned in the flue gas flow. Biomass and other materials can also be added to the mixture. Coal contains mineral matter which is converted to ash during combustion. The ash is removed as bottom ash and fly ash. The bottom ash is removed at the furnace bottom.

This type of boiler dominates coal-fired power stations, providing steam to drive large turbines.

== History ==
Prior to the developments leading to the use of pulverized coal, most boilers utilized grate firing where the fuel was mechanically distributed onto a moving grate at the bottom of the firebox in a partially crushed gravel-like form. Air for combustion was blown upward through the grate carrying the lighter ash and smaller particles of unburned coal up with it, some of which would adhere to the sides of the firebox. In 1918, The Milwaukee Electric Railway and Light Company, later Wisconsin Electric, conducted tests in the use of pulverized coal at its Oneida Street power plant. Those experiments helped Fred L. Dornbrook to develop methods of controlling the pulverized coal's tarry ash residues with boiler feed water tube jackets that served to reduce the surface temperature of the firebox walls and allowed the ash deposits be easily removed. That plant became the first central power station in the United States to use pulverized fuel.

The Oneida Street power plant near Milwaukee's City Hall was decommissioned and renovated in 1987. It is now the site of the Milwaukee Repertory Theatre.

== Pulverization of coal ==
Coal pulverizers may be classified by speed, as follows:

- Low Speed
- Medium Speed
- High Speed

=== Low speed ===
A ball mill is a low speed pulverizer that consists of a horizontal rotating cylinder, up to three diameters in length, containing a charge of tumbling or cascading steel balls, pebbles, or rods.

A tube mill is a revolving cylinder of up to five diameters in length used for fine pulverization of ore, rock, and other such materials; the material, mixed with water, is fed into the chamber from one end, and passes out the other end as a slurry.

Both types of mill include liners that protect the cylindrical structure of the mill from wear. Thus the main wear parts in these mills are the balls themselves, and the liners. The balls are simply "consumed" by the wear process and must be re-stocked, whereas the liners must be periodically replaced.

The ball and tube crushers are low-speed machines that grind the coal with steel balls in a rotating horizontal cylinder. Due to its shape, it is called a tube mill and due to use of grinding balls for crushing, it is called a ball mill, or both terms as a ball tube mill.

These mills are also designated as an example size, BBD-4772:

- B – Broyer (Name of inventor).
- B – Boulet (French word for balls).
- D – Direct firing.
- 47 – Diameter of shell (in decimeters) i.e. 4.7 m diameter.
- 72 – Length of shell (in decimeters) i.e. 7.2 m length.

The grinding in the ball and tube mill is produced by the rotating quantity of steel balls by their fall and lift due to tube rotation. The ball charge may occupy one third to half of the total internal volume of the shell. The significant feature incorporated in the BBD mills is its double end operation, each end catering to one elevation of a boiler. The system facilitated entry of raw coal and exit of pulverized fuel from same end simultaneously. This helps in reducing the number of installations per unit.

==== Mill construction details ====
A ball tube mill may be described as a cylinder made of steel plates having separate heads or trunions attached to the ends with each trunion resting on suitable bearings for supporting the machine. The trunions are hollow to allow for the introduction of discharge of the materials undergoing reduction in size. The mill shell is lined with chilled iron, carbon steel, manganese steel, or high chrome liners attached to shell body with counter sunk bolts. These liners are made in different shapes so that the counter inside surface of the mill is suited for requirement of a particular application.

The shells are of three pieces. The intermediate shell connects to the end shells by flange joints and the total length of shell is 7.2 m. The liners are fastened to the inner side of mill shell (cylindrical part) to protect the shell from the impact of the steel balls. There are 600 liners of ten variants in each shell weighing 60.26 tonnes. The original lift value of the liners is 55 mm. and the minimum lift allowed is 20 mm.

==== Operation ====
The primary air input to a ball tube mill performs a dual function. It is used for drying and as the fuel transport medium, and by regulating it the mill output is regulated. Governed by the pulverized fuel outlet temperature requirement, the cold air and hot air dampers are regulated to achieve the correct primary air temperature. In addition to raising the coal temperature inside the mill for drying and better grinding, the same air works as the transport medium to move the pulverized coal out of the mill: it travels through the annular space between the fixed trunnion tubes and the rotating hot air tube onwards to the classifier. Coal-laden air passes through double cone static classifiers, with adjustable classifier vanes, for segregation into pulverized fuel of the desired fineness, and coarse particles. The pulverised fuel continues its journey towards the coal burners for combustion. The coarse particles rejected in the classifier are returned to the mill for another cycle of grinding.

In order to avoid excess sweeping of coal from the mill, only part of the primary air, directly proportional to the boiler load demand, is passed through the mill. Furthermore, to ensure sufficient velocity of pulverized fuel to avoid settling in the pipes, an additional quantity of primary air is fed into a mixing box on the raw coal circuit. This by-pass air tapped from the primary air duct going into the mill makes an appreciable contribution to the drying of raw coal, by a flash drying effect, in addition to picking up the pulverized fuel from the mill outlet for its transportation towards the classifiers.

The tube mill output (responding to boiler load demand) is controlled by regulating the primary air-flow. This regulation, by sweeping pulverized fuel from the mill, is very fast; comparable with oil firing response, but needs the coal level to be maintained in the mill. A control circuit monitors the coal level in the mill, and controls the speed of the raw coal feeder to maintain it. Maintaining the coal level in the mill offers a built-in capacity cushion of pulverized fuel to take care of short interruptions in the raw coal circuit.

The mill is pressurized and the air-tightness is ensured by plenum chambers around the rotating trunnion filled with pressurized seal air. Bleeding seal air from plenum chamber to the mill maintains separation between pulverized fuel in the Mill and the outside atmosphere. Inadequacy or absence of seal air will allow escape of pulverized fuel into atmosphere. On the other hand, an excess of seal air leaking into mill will affect the mill outlet temperature. As such the seal air is controlled by a local control damper maintaining just sufficient differential pressure for sealing.

==== Ring and ball mill ====
This type of mill, classified as medium speed, consists of two types of rings separated by a series of large balls, like a thrust bearing. The lower ring rotates, while the upper ring presses down on the balls via a set of spring and adjuster assemblies, or pressurised rams. The material to be pulverized is introduced into the center or side of the pulverizer (depending on the design). As the lower ring rotates, the balls to orbit between the upper and lower rings, and balls roll over the bed of coal on the lower ring. The pulverized material is carried out of the mill by the flow of air moving through it. The size of the pulverized particles released from the grinding section of the mill is determined by a classifier separator. If the coal is fine enough to be picked up by the air, it is carried through the classifier. Coarser particles return to be further pulverized.

=== Vertical spindle roller mill ===
Similar to the ring and ball mill, the vertical spindle roller mill uses large "tires" to crush the coal. It is also classified as medium speed. These mills are usually found in utility plants. Raw coal is gravity-fed through a central feed pipe to the grinding table where it flows outwardly by centrifugal action and is ground between the rollers and table. Hot primary air for drying and coal transport enters the windbox plenum underneath the grinding table and flows upward through a swirl ring having multiple sloped nozzles surrounding the grinding table. The air mixes with and dries coal in the grinding zone and carries pulverized coal particles upward into a classifier.

Fine pulverized coal exits the outlet section through multiple discharge coal pipes leading to the burners, while oversized coal particles are rejected and returned to the grinding zone for further grinding. Pyrites and extraneous dense impurity material fall through the nozzle ring and are plowed, by scraper blades attached to the grinding table, into the pyrites chamber to be removed. Mechanically, the vertical roller mill is categorized as an applied force mill. There are three grinding roller wheel assemblies in the mill grinding section, which are mounted on a loading frame via pivot point. The fixed-axis roller in each roller wheel assembly rotates on a segmentally-lined grinding table that is supported and driven by a planetary gear reducer direct-coupled to a motor. The grinding force for coal pulverization is applied by a loading frame. This frame is connected by vertical tension rods to three hydraulic cylinders secured to the mill foundation. All forces used in the pulverizing process are transmitted to the foundation via the gear reducer and loading elements. The pendulum movement of the roller wheels provides a freedom for wheels to move in a radial direction, which results in no radial loading against the mill housing during the pulverizing process.

Depending on the required coal fineness, there are two types of classifier that may be selected for a vertical roller mill. The dynamic classifier, which consists of a stationary angled inlet vane assembly surrounding a rotating vane assembly or cage, is capable of producing micrometer-fine pulverized coal with a narrow particle size distribution. In addition, adjusting the speed of the rotating cage can easily change the intensity of the centrifugal force field in the classification zone to achieve coal fineness control real-time to make immediate accommodation for a change in fuel or boiler load conditions. For the applications where a micrometer-fine pulverized coal is not necessary, the static classifier, which consists of a cone equipped with adjustable vanes, is an option at a lower cost since it contains no moving parts. With adequate mill grinding capacity, a vertical mill equipped with a static classifier is capable of producing a coal fineness up to 99.5% or higher <50 mesh and 80% or higher <200 mesh, while one equipped with a dynamic classifier produces coal fineness levels of 100% <100 mesh and 95% <200 mesh, or better.

In 1954 a Jet Pulverizer was developed in which operates like a Vertical Pulverizer only the item is pulverized by the high speed air action. For example, forcing coal against coal.

Similar to the vertical roller mill, a bowl mill also uses tires to crush coal. There are two types, a deep bowl mill, and a shallow bowl mill.

=== High speed ===
The attrition mill is a high speed device for mechanically reducing solid particle size by intense agitation of a slurry of material being milled and coarse milling media. For example, in 10 hours of milling, specific surfaces of 40 and 25 m2/g were obtained for alumina and barite, corresponding to 38 and 56 nm equivalent spherical diameter, respectively. Size reduction rates for relatively coarse particles were first-order and increased linearly with power input to the mill. Optimum milling medium concentration corresponded to medium particles moving a distance of approximately 0.7 of their diameter before collision with another such particle. Power characteristics of the attrition mill were essentially the same as those of a radial flow turbine mixer. Laminar flow became disrupted at NRe ≈ 200, while turbulent flow was established at NRe > 8000. Slurries of fine powders exhibited the same linear power-average density dependence as single-phase liquids. However, a different dependence was observed with large particles.

==== Beater wheel mill ====
Beater wheel mills are designed to prepare a coal powder air-fuel mixture for combustion in furnace chambers of coal-fired power plants by coal drying, pulverizing, classifying and transport. Their multipurpose function usually results in operation instability accompanied by unacceptable vibration. This usually is a significant problem due to unplanned shutdowns. Beater wheel mill maintenance program requires special attention due to operation under non-stationary conditions. The purpose of this paper was to identify pulverizing process parameter that affect the beater wheel mill vibration level and severity at the same time by using statistical principles under a wide range of operating conditions. This paper intends to establish the foundations to investigate correlation of pulverizing process parameter with beater wheel mill vibration in order to set up a better predictive maintenance program. To achieve this goal, the beater wheel mill vibration under different combinations of selected pulverizing process parameters are analyzed using statistical tools. Experiments were carried out under different conditions for two identical but separated beater wheel mills. The influence of pulverizing process parameter, such as electrical current of the driving motor, mill capacity, boiler production, coal types on mill vibration are investigated to identify the potential malfunction of beater wheel mills and their associated components for predictive maintenance purposes. The results have demonstrated that the selected pulverizing process parameters do not have significant influence on beater wheel mill vibration severity. Unlike most coal mills where pulverizing process parameters must take into account, here with beater wheel impact mills it is not the case and condition monitoring of these mills could be conducted offline or online using standard vibration condition monitoring methods.

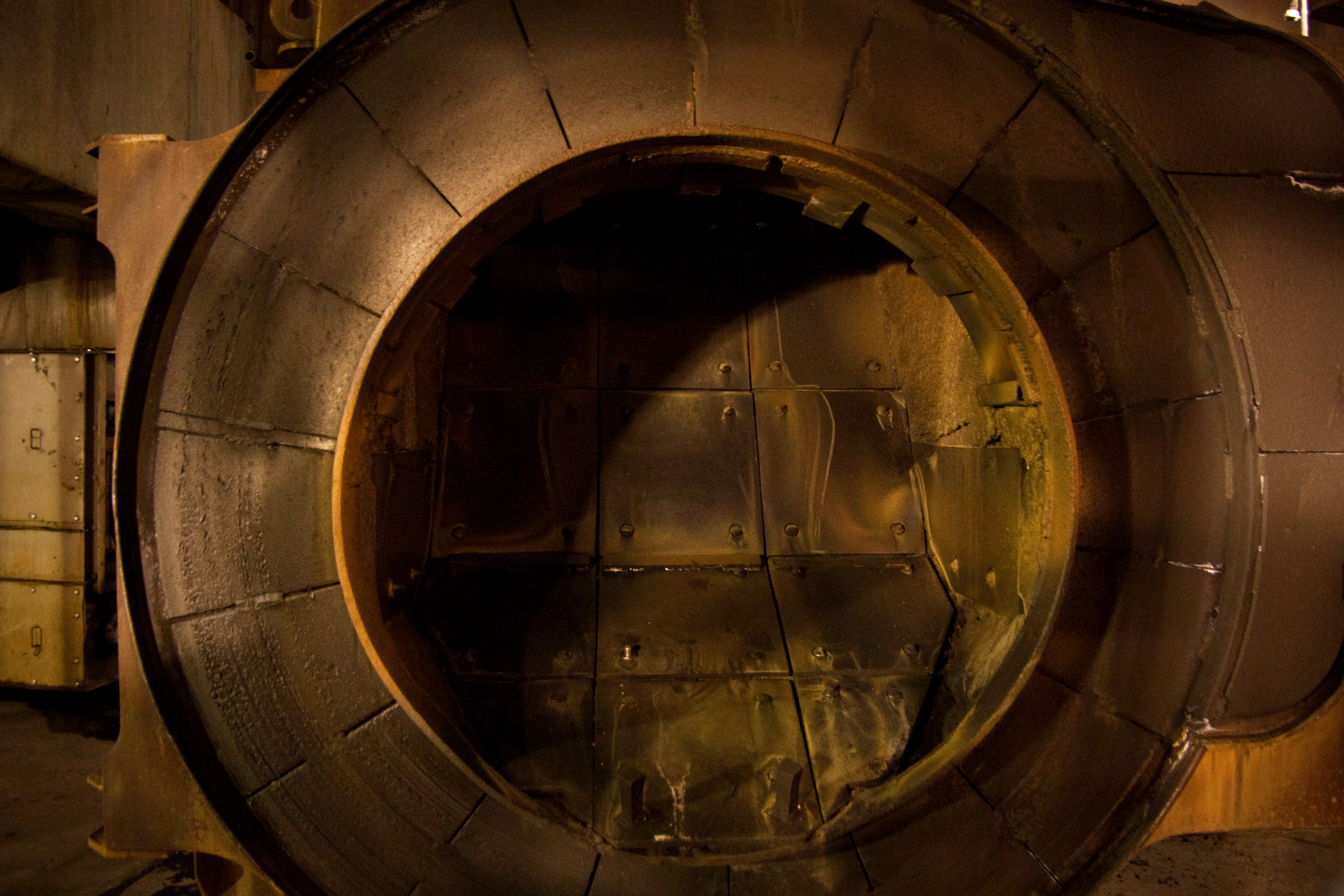
Power plant Klingenberg, Berlin

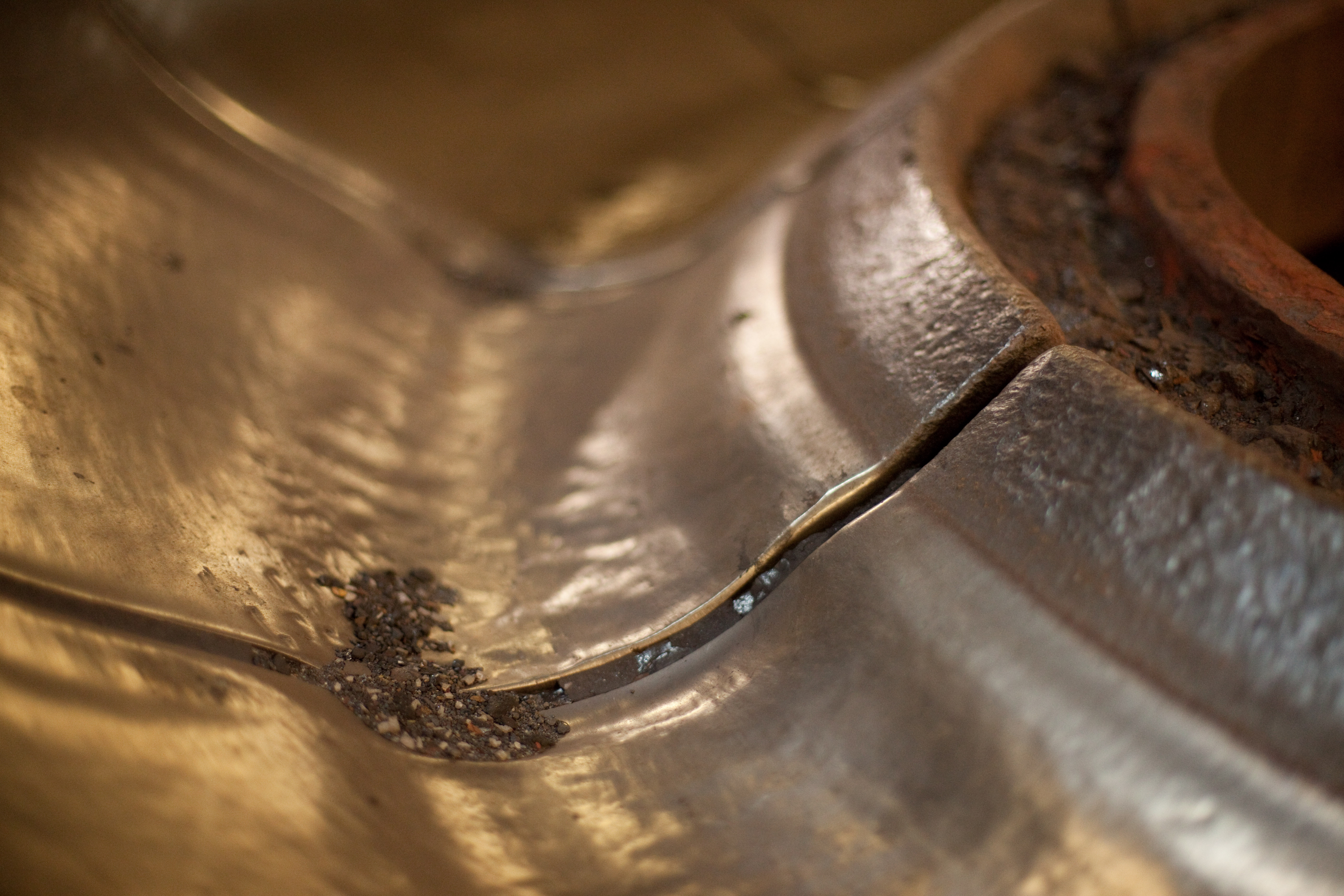
Power plant Reuter-West, Berlin

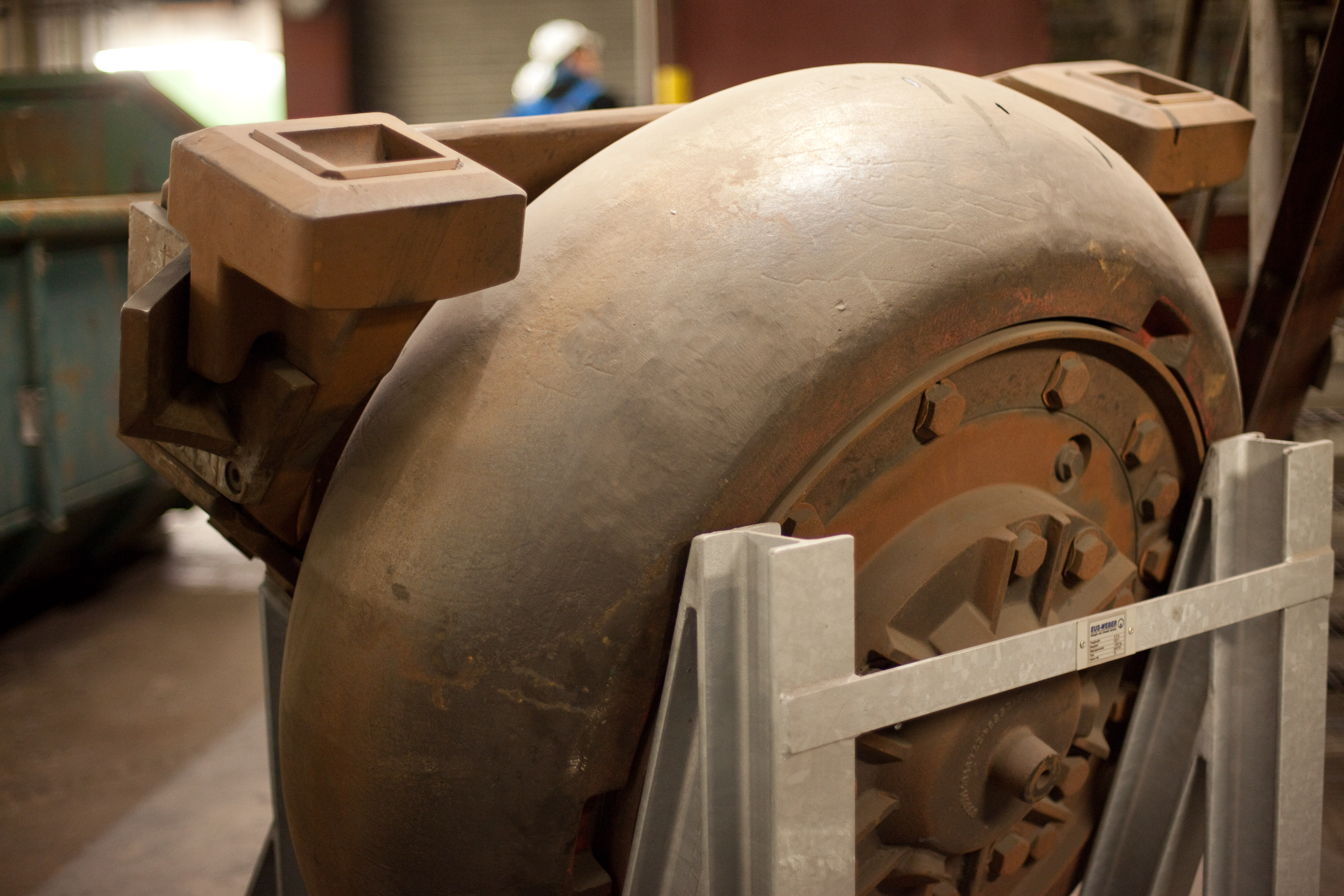
Power plant Reuter-West, Berlin

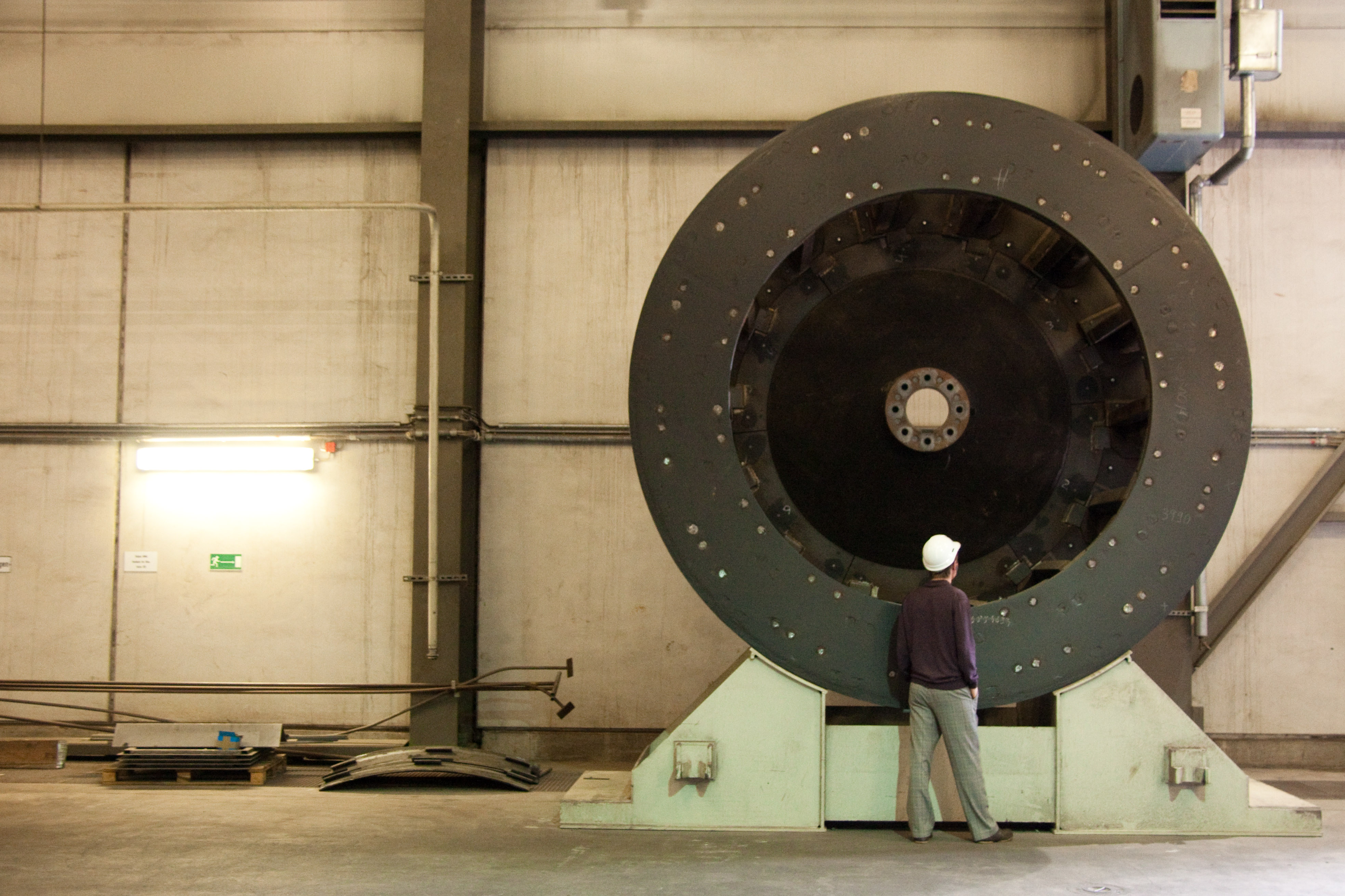
Schwarze Pumpe power station

== How a coal burner works ==
The concept of burning coal that has been pulverized into a fine powder stems from the belief that if the coal is made fine enough, it will burn almost as easily and efficiently as a gas. The feeding rate of the pulverized coal is controlled by computers, and is varied according to the boiler demand and the amount of air available for drying and transporting fuel. Pieces of coal are crushed between balls or cylindrical rollers that move between two tracks or "races." The raw coal is then fed into the pulverizer along with air heated to about 650 °F (340 °C) from the boiler. As the coal gets crushed by the rolling action, the hot air dries it and blows out the usable fine coal powder to be used as fuel. The powdered coal from the pulverizer is directly blown to a burner in the boiler. The burner mixes the powdered coal in the air suspension with additional pre-heated combustion air and forces it out of a nozzle similar in action to fuel being atomized by a fuel injector in an internal combustion engine. Under operating conditions, there is enough heat in the combustion zone to ignite all the incoming fuel.

=== Ash removal ===
There are two methods of ash removal at furnace bottom:

- Dry bottom boiler
- Wet bottom boiler, also called Slag tap

The fly ash is carried away with the flue gas and is separated from it into various hoppers along its path, and finally in an ESP or a bag filter.

== Current technologies ==
Pulverized coal power plants are divided into three categories: subcritical pulverized coal (SubCPC) plants, supercritical pulverized coal (SCPC) plants, and ultra-supercritical pulverized coal (USCPC) plants. The primary difference between the three types of pulverized coal boilers are the operating temperatures and pressures. Subcritical plants operate below the critical point of water (647.096 K and 22.064 MPa). Supercritical and ultra-supercritical plants operate above the critical point. As pressures and temperatures increase, so does the operating efficiency. Subcritical plants operate at about 37% efficiency, supercritical plants at about 40%, and ultra-supercritical plants in the 42-45% range.

There are many type of pulverized coal, having different calorific values (CV), such as Indonesian coal or steel grade coal (Indian coal).

== Steam locomotives ==
Pulverized coal firing has been used, to a limited extent, in steam locomotives. For example, see Prussian G 12.

== Merchant ships ==
In 1929, the United States Shipping Board evaluated a pulverized coal-boiler on the steamship Mercer, a 9,500 ton merchant ship. According to its report, the boiler heated with pulverized coal on the Mercer ran at 95% of the efficiency of its best oil-fuelled journey. Firing pulverized coal was also cheaper to operate and install than ship boilers using oil as fuel. First steps towards using Diesel engines as means of propulsion (on smaller ships) were also undertaken by the end of the 1920s ― see Dieselisation.

== See also ==
- Coal-water slurry fuel
- Fluidized bed combustion
- Pulverizer
- Fossil fuel power plant
