= William Fairbairn (disambiguation) =

Sir William Fairbairn (1789–1874) was a Scottish engineer.

William Fairbairn may also refer to:

- William E. Fairbairn (1885–1960), British soldier and police officer
- William Fairbairn & Sons, an engineering works in Manchester, England
- Bill Fairbairn (born 1947), ice hockey player
- William Alexander Fairbairn (1902–1984), British forester and ornithologist
- William Ronald Dodds Fairbairn (1889–1964), member of the British Psychoanalytical Society

== See also ==
- Fairbairn (disambiguation)
- William (disambiguation)
