= Thomas Fairbairn =

Sir Thomas Fairbain, Bt DL

High Sheriff of Hampshire
- In office 1870–1871
- Preceded by: John Morant
- Succeeded by: Henry Compton

Personal details
- Born: 18 January 1823 Ardwick, Manchester
- Died: 12 August 1891 (aged 68) Bishopstoke, Hampshire
- Spouse: Allison Callaway (after 1848)
- Relations: Peter Fairbairn (uncle); Andrew Fairbairn (cousin)
- Parent(s): William Fairbairn; Dorothy Mar

Sir Thomas Fairbairn, 2nd Baronet DL (18 January 1823 – 12 August 1891) was an English industrialist and art collector.

== Early life ==
Fairbairn was born in the Polygon in Ardwick, near the centre of Manchester. He was the third of eight surviving children of Dorothy Mar and Sir William Fairbairn (1789–1874). His father was a Scottish engineer who moved to Manchester in the early 19th century, where he designed bridges, and established a business, William Fairbairn & Sons, that was involved in iron founding, boilermaking, ship building, and manufacturing steam locomotives. He was a nephew of Peter Fairbairn of Leeds - also an engineer like his brother - and first cousin of MP Andrew Fairbairn.

== Career ==
After a private education, Thomas Fairbairn worked in his father's businesses from 1840, and took charge of the firm's shipbuilding operation in Millwall. After a tour of Italy in 1841–2, he started to use his industrial wealth to collect paintings.

He was High Sheriff of Hampshire in 1870 and succeeded his father as 2nd Baronet in 1874.

=== Art collection ===
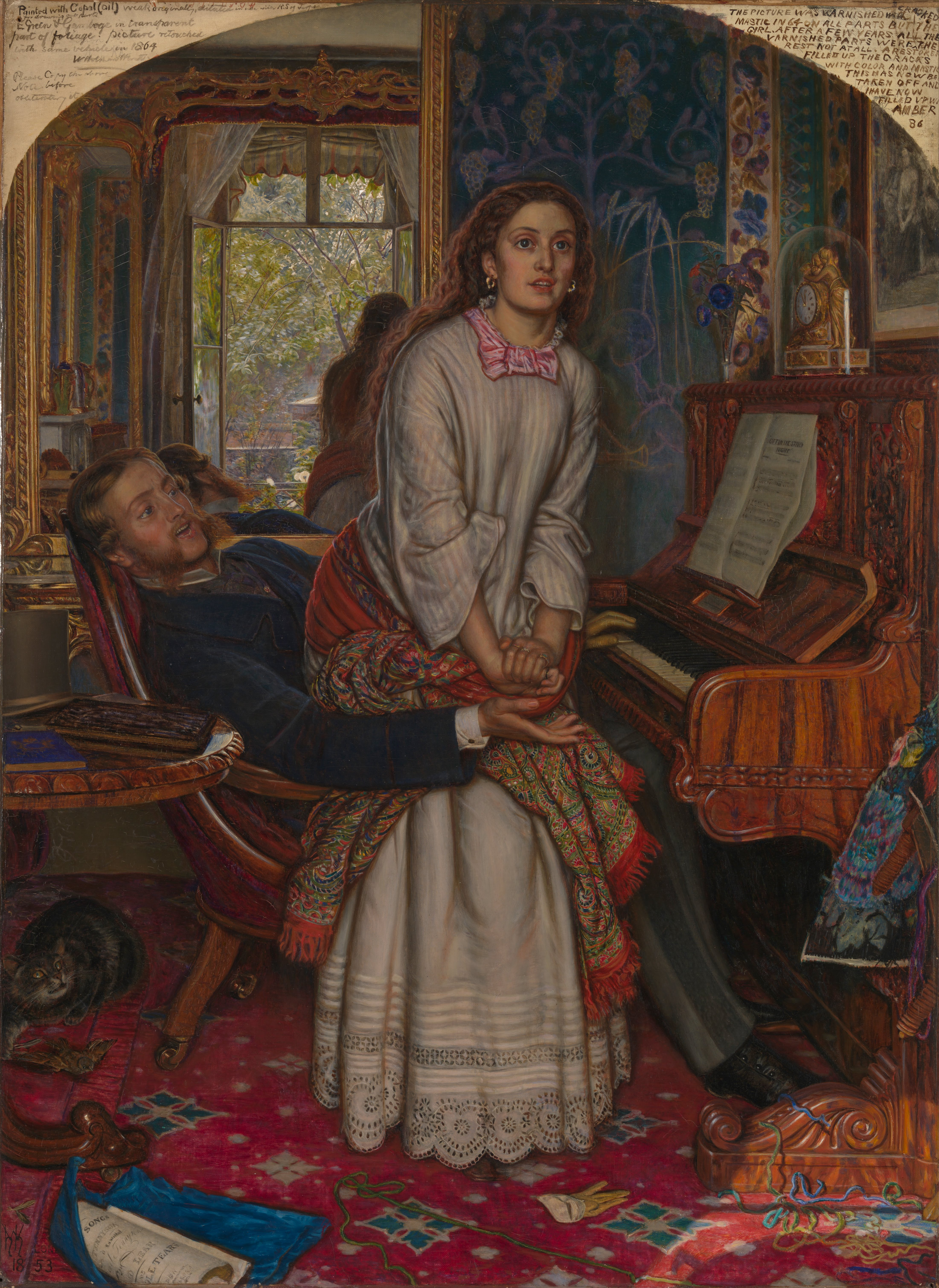
The Awakening Conscience, by William Holman Hunt, 1853

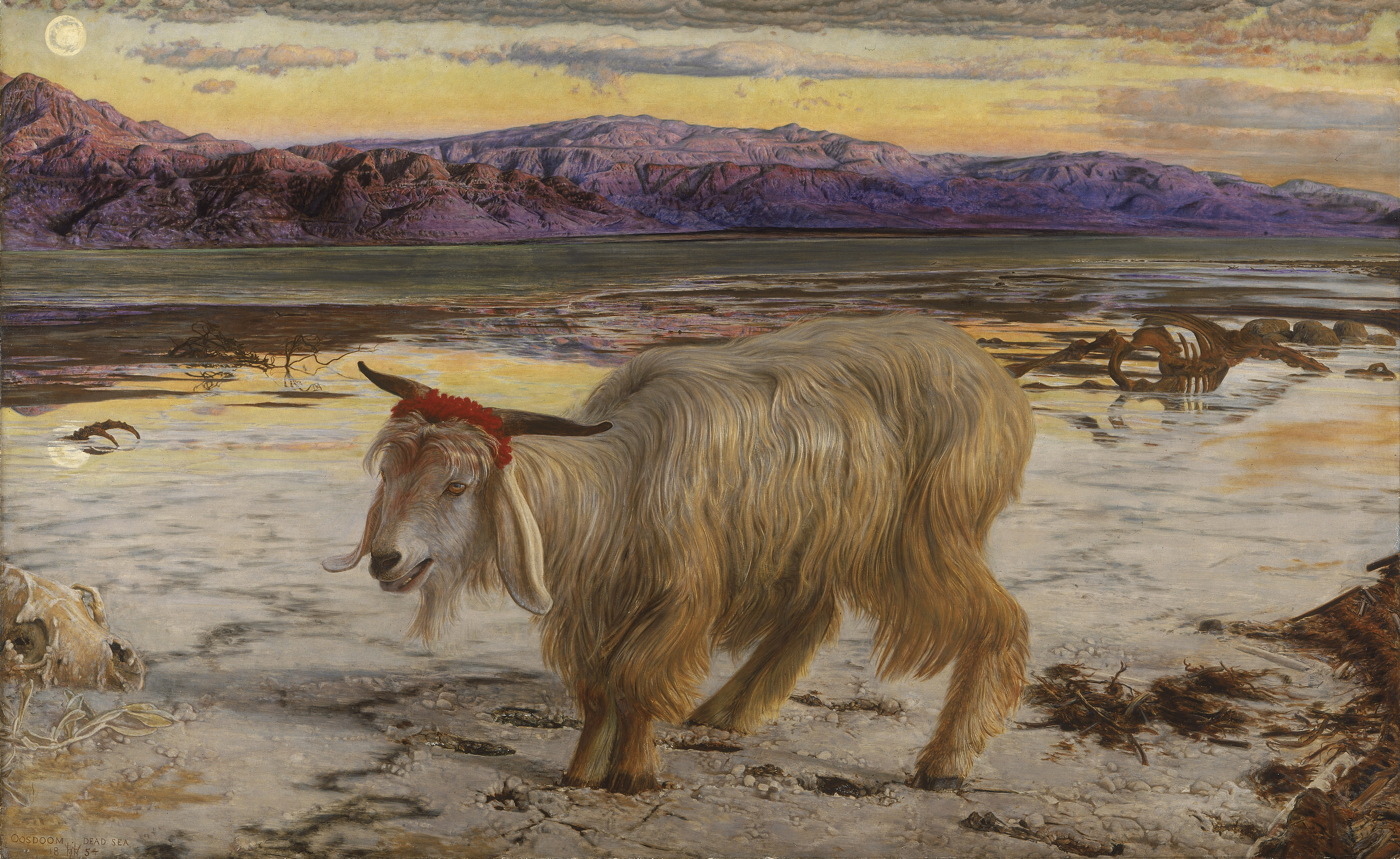
The Scapegoat, by Hunt, 1854

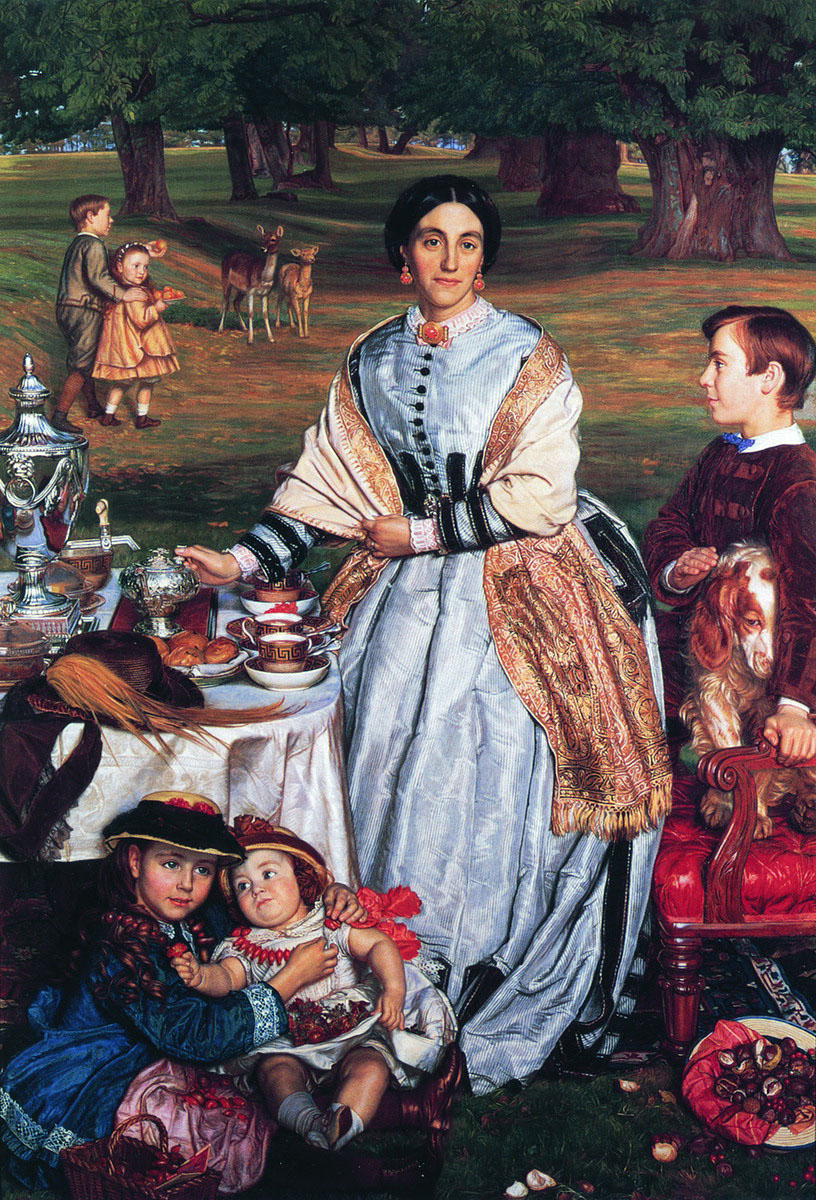
The Children's Holiday, by Hunt, 1864

Fairbairn was impressed by the works of William Holman Hunt exhibited at the 1853 Royal Academy exhibition, and commissioned Hunt to complete his 1853 painting The Awakening Conscience, although he asked Hunt to repaint the expression of the female figure. He also persuaded Hunt to make changes to his 1854 painting The Scapegoat. Fairbairn commissioned a group portrait of his wife and five children from Hunt in 1864, which became his The Children's Holiday. Although he acquired portraits from Hunt, Fairbairn generally preferred Pre-Raphaelite landscapes and historical painting. He commissioned paintings by Edward Lear, and sculptures by Thomas Woolner, including a life-sized marble sculpture of his two deaf children in 1857–1862.

Fairburn was a commissioner of the 1851 Great Exhibition, and chairman of the Executive Committee that organised the 1857 Art Treasures Exhibition in Manchester, selecting the firm that built the temporary exhibition building, C. D. Young & Co, who were already building the Museum of Science and Art in South Kensington (later the Victoria and Albert Museum). His friend Augustus Egg was appointed as director of the gallery of Modern Masters at the exhibition, with many of Fairburn's favourite Pre-Raphaelites being selected. He was responsible for the decision to purchase Jules Soulages's collection for £13,500, to form the core of the collection of medieval and Renaissance decorative arts. It was later sold in instalments to the V&A. Fairbairn was offered a knighthood for his efforts, but declined.

Fairbairn worked on the International Exhibitions of 1862, 1867 and 1871. From 1860, he struggled with a project to open a new, free new art gallery for Manchester, which finally opened as the City Art Gallery in 1882. He was elected to the Royal Commission for the Exhibition of 1851 in May 1861.

Many of his pictures were auctioned off in the 1890s, and the remainder of the collection was broken up after his death from a stroke.

== Personal life ==
On 23 March 1848, he married Allison Callaway, a daughter of Thomas Callaway, and settled back in Manchester. In around 1862, he moved to Burton Park, near Petworth in Sussex, but moved to Brambridge House, in Bishopstoke near Southampton, by 1866. Thomas and Allison were the parents of at least five children together, two of whom (his son Arthur and daughter Constance), were born deaf. Their children included:

- Sir Arthur Henderson Fairbairn, 3rd Baronet (1852–1915), who married Florence Frideswyde Long, daughter of Richard Penruddocke Long, in 1882.
- Sir Thomas Gordon Fairbairn, 4th Baronet (1854–1931), who married Ada Maria Fairbairn, daughter of William Andrew Fairbairn, in 1877. After her death in 1893, he married Jennie Cora Davies, a daughter of Albert Davies, in 1899.
- Reginald Fairbairn (1856–1921), who married May Elizabeth Holt, a daughter of J. F. Holt, in 1880.
- Mary Allison Dorothy Fairbairn (1860–1936), who married Sir Archibald Milliken Napier, 10th Baronet, son of Sir Robert Milliken-Napier, 9th Baronet, in 1880.
- James Brooke Fairbairn (b. 1863), a Captain in the Durham Light Infantry.

He died in Bishopstoke, Hampshire, on 12 August 1891 and was buried at Twyford church. He was succeeded in the baronetcy by his son, Arthur.

Baronetage of the United Kingdom
Preceded by William Fairbairn	Baronet (of Ardwick); 1874–1891	Succeeded by Arthur Fairbairn
