= Fairbairn-Beeley boiler =

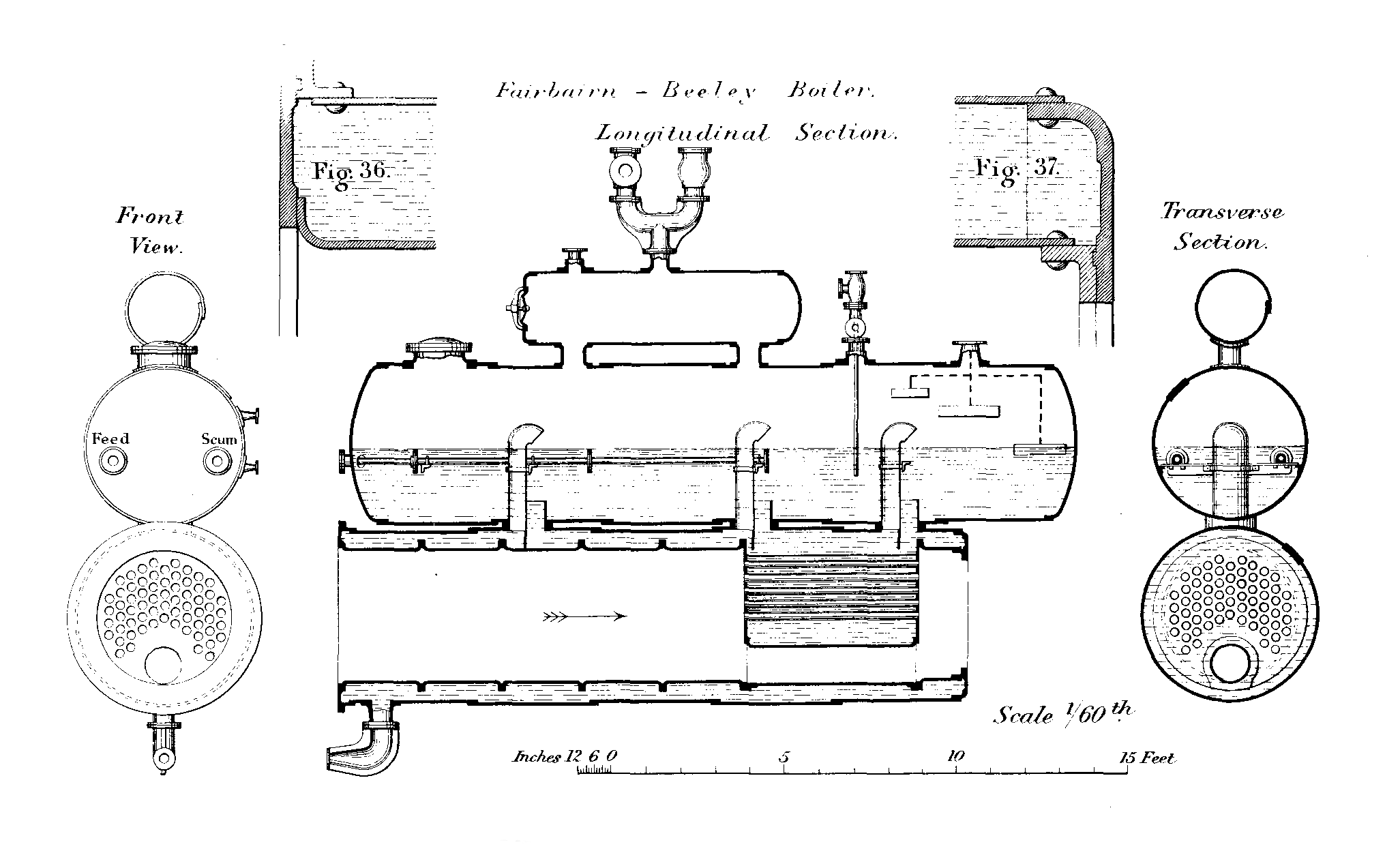
Fairbairn-Beeley boiler

The Fairbairn-Beeley boiler was a design of fire-tube stationary boiler developed in the late 19th century. It takes its name from its two developers, Sir William Fairbairn and Thomas Beeley.

== Origins ==
Sir William Fairbairn (1789–1874) was one of the most mathematically inclined of the Victorian mechanical engineers. Assisted by his mathematical analyst Eaton Hodgkinson, he conducted the first theoretical analysis of the stress in cylinders. Their first interest was in studying the design and failures of large-diameter Lancashire boilers. Fairbairn realised that the hoop stress was twice the longitudinal stress, and that both were related to the diameter of pressure vessels.

Thomas Beeley (1833–1908) was the proprietor of the well-known Manchester boilermakers, Hyde Junction Iron Works, later known as Thomas Beeley and Son. (Note: The son was Thomas Carter Beeley.)

== Design ==
Fairbairn's work had shown the benefits of reducing the diameter of a boiler's external shell as a means of reducing the forces upon it. The overall vertical height of the boiler could not be reduced, as this represented the clear steam space above the water level which is important to avoid the risk of priming. Oval boilers had already been tried to achieve this vertical extension, but pressure within them tended to force them into a more cylindrical shape; repeated cycling like this led to increased corrosion along the riveted joints and fatigue failures.

Fairbairn's innovation was to use three cylindrical shells of small diameter, stacked vertically. The central drum was a mixed steam and water space with the water level midway through it. A typical size would be 5 or 6 ft (1.5 or 1.8 m) in diameter and 20 ft (6.1 m) long. A smaller drum above this acted as a steam space, the narrow communicating pipes between them also helping to stop carryover with steam.

The lowest drum of the three provided the heating surface. This was almost entirely filled with a cylindrical corrugated furnace. A length, approximately one diameter, was filled with around 60 small diameter fire-tubes. Compared to previous large-flued stationary boilers such as the Lancashire or Galloway boilers, this was a larger heating area in a very compact space. (Note: The heating area, per length of tube, could be easily twice that of the single flue, assuming 60 2 in (51 mm) tubes in the space of a 60 inch flue.) The tubes were still short, compared to locomotive boilers, and offered good gasflow for the exhaust gases without needing additional exhaust draughting.

The waterspace around the furnace was just thick enough to allow good circulation and leave space for mud to build up, but otherwise keeping the water volume to a minimum. This led to rapid heating of the water and good thermosyphon circulation into the central drum above. This circulation was encouraged by the provision of a number of pipe connections between the drums. Each connection had an internal divider to give two separated pipes, the downcomer being just a short pipe from the lower part of the drum, but the outlet of the upwell pipe was raised above the water level and turned over in an outlet nozzle, promoting mixing of the hottest water and avoiding the formation of a stratified hot layer above cold. Examples showed a single large diameter fire-tube at the base of the tubeplate and a full-diameter section of furnace beyond the fire-tube nest, but the purpose of either of these features is unclear. Like the larger Lancashire boilers, exhaust gases were then led through brick flues around the outside of the boiler.

An outwardly similar design had been used earlier, with the elephant boiler of the 1840s. This used three cylindrical shells, with two directly heated (Note: Exposed to the direct radiant heat of the fire) cylinders below a single central steam drum. It pre-dated Fairbairn's theoretical work though and the multiple drums were to provide extra heating surface area, rather than for structural reasons. These boilers were more a development of the egg-ended boiler, as externally heated drums without fire-tubes.

== Operation ==
Although never a widely used boiler, this type was adopted towards the end of the 19th century for dynamically changing loads, where a more responsive boiler than the Lancashire was needed. One field that adopted them was that of the city-scale hydraulic power networks. The London Hydraulic Power Company installed them at their City Road and Wapping Hydraulic Power Stations. They were also used to power early electricity generators for mills and factories, in the period between the Lancashire boiler and the first water-tube boilers.

== See also ==
- Fairbairn's five-tube boiler, an earlier centre-flued boiler with multiple shells.
