= Fairbairn (disambiguation) =

Fairbairn is a surname.

Fairbairn may also refer to:

- Fairbairn - Mythical heroic progenitor of the Clan Armstrong who, dressed in full armour, lifted the king of Scotland onto his own horse with one arm
- Fairbairn Airbase, RAAF Base Fairbairn, Defence Establishment Fairbairn, Fairbairn (Business Park) and Fairbairn, Canberra, at different times, all refer to the same piece of land in Canberra named after James Fairbairn
- Fairbairn baronets of Ardwick, a British baronetcy
- Fairbairn College, a co-educational high school in Cape Town, South Africa
- Fairbairn steam crane
- Fairbairn Lawson Combe Barbour, an English company involved in landmark legal decision Fibrosa Spolka Akcyjna v. Fairbairn Lawson Combe Barbour
- Fairbairn–Sykes fighting knife, sometimes referred to as "a Fairbairn"

== See also ==
- William Fairbairn & Sons, a locomotive manufacturer established 1839 in Manchester, England
