= Fusible plug =

Thermally triggered safety valve

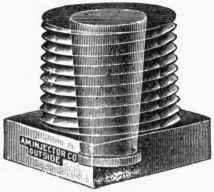
A drawing of a fusible plug, showing the tapered core

A fusible plug is a threaded cylinder of metal, usually bronze, brass or gunmetal, with a tapered hole drilled completely through its length. This hole is sealed with a metal of low melting point that flows away if a predetermined high temperature is reached. The initial use of the fusible plug was as a safety precaution against low water levels in steam engine boilers, but later applications extended its use to other closed vessels, such as air conditioning systems and tanks for transporting corrosive or liquefied petroleum gases.

== Purpose ==
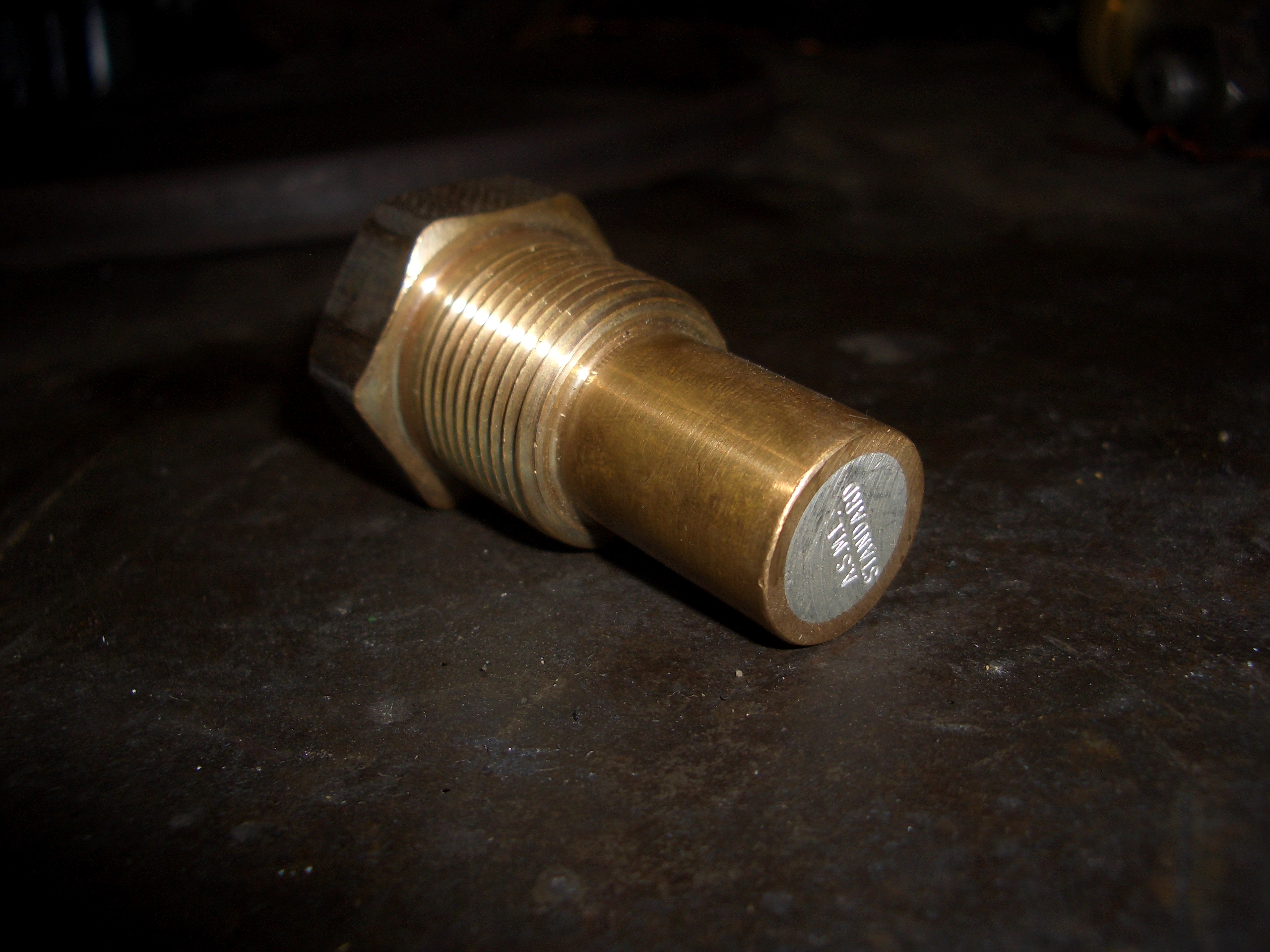
The core of low-melting-point metal is visible in this modern fusible plug.

A fusible plug operates as a safety valve when dangerous temperatures, rather than dangerous pressures, are reached in a closed vessel. In steam boilers the fusible plug is screwed into the crown sheet (the top plate) of the firebox, typically extending about 1 in (25 mm) into the water space above it. Its purpose is to act as a last-resort safety device in the event of the water level falling dangerously low: when the top of the plug is out of the water it overheats, the low-melting-point core melts away and the resulting blast of steam into the firebox warns the operators before the top of the firebox itself runs completely dry, which could result in a boiler explosion. The flue gases in a steam engine firebox can reach 1,000 °F (538 °C), a temperature that copper, from which most fireboxes were made, softens to the point it can no longer sustain boiler pressure and explode if water is not quickly added to the boiler and the fire damped down or extinguished. The hole through the plug is too small to greatly reduce steam pressure and the small amount of water, if any, that passes through is not sufficient to lower the fire.

== History ==
The device was invented in 1803 by Richard Trevithick, the proponent of high-pressure (as opposed to atmospheric) steam engines, in consequence of an explosion in one of his new boilers. His detractors were eager to denounce the whole concept of high-pressure steam, but Trevithick proved that the accident happened because his fireman had neglected to keep the boiler full of water. He publicised his invention widely, without patent, to counter these criticisms.

=== Experiments ===
Experiments conducted by the Franklin Institute, Boston, in the 1830s had initially cast doubt on the practice of adding water as soon as the escape of steam through the device was noted. A steam boiler was fitted with a small observation window of glass and heated beyond its normal operating temperature with the water level below the top of the firebox. When water was added it was found that the pressure rose suddenly and the observation glass shattered. The report concluded that the high temperature of the metal had vaporised the added water too quickly and that an explosion was the inevitable result.

It was not until 1852 that this assumption was challenged: Thomas Redmond, one of the Institute's inspectors, specifically ruled out this theory in his investigation into the boiler explosion on the steamship Redstone on the Ohio River on 3 April that year. A 1907 investigation in Wales came to a similar conclusion: a steam locomotive belonging to the Rhymney Railway was inadvertently sent out with its safety valves wrongly assembled. The pressure in the boiler built up to the extent that the injectors failed; the crown sheet became uncovered, was weakened by the heat of the fire and violently blew apart. The investigation, led by Colonel Druitt of the Railway Inspectorate, dismissed the theory that the enginemen had succeeded in starting the injectors and that the sudden flood of cold water had caused such a generation of steam that the boiler burst. He quoted the results of experiments by the Manchester Steam Users' Association, a national boiler certification and insurance body, that proved that the weight of copper present (considered with its specific heat) was insufficient to generate enough steam to raise the boiler pressure at all. Indeed, the addition of cold water caused the pressure to fall. From then on it was accepted that the correct action in the event of the operation of the fusible plug was to add water.

=== Cored fusible plugs ===
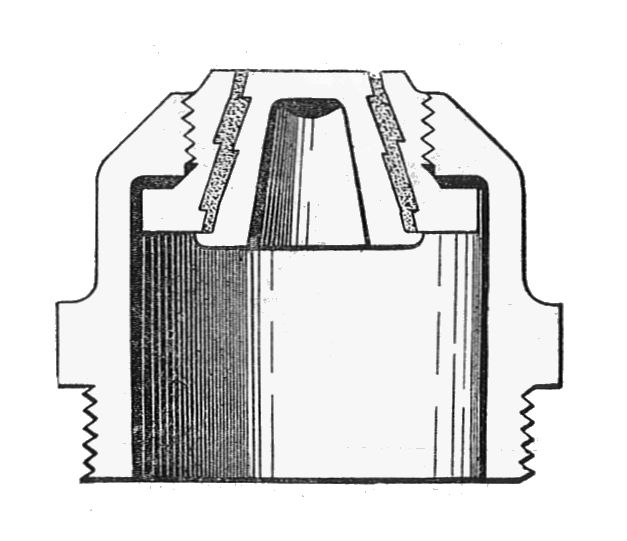
Fusible plug with a core

The simple solid plug is filled with a slug of low-melting-point alloy. When this melts, it first melts as a narrow channel through the plug. Steam and water immediately begins to escape through this. As the water will have a maximum temperature of 410 °F (210 °C), lower than tin's melting point of 410 °F, this water jet may act to freeze the plug. While water continues to escape from the plug, the plug may fail to melt completely and so only a minor jet of steam is noticed, which may be overlooked.

To avoid this, the cored fusible plug was developed in the 1860s to give a wide opening as soon as the alloy softens. This has a solid brass or bronze centre, soldered into place by a thick layer of the low-melting-point alloy. When overheated, the plug does not release any steam or water until the alloy melts sufficiently to release the centre plug. The plug now fails dramatically, opening its entire bore immediately. This full-bore jet is then more likely to be noticed.

=== Un-noticed melted plugs ===
A drawback to the device was found on 7 March 1948, when the firebox crown sheet of Princess Alexandra, a Coronation Pacific of the London, Midland and Scottish Railway, failed while hauling a passenger train from Glasgow to London. Enquiries established that both water gauges were defective and on a journey earlier that day one or both of the fusible plugs had melted, but this had gone unnoticed by the engine crew because of the strong draught carrying the escaping steam away from them.

== Maintenance ==
=== Alloy composition ===
Investigation showed the importance of the alloy on plug ageing. Alloys were initially favoured as they offered lower eutectic melting points than pure metals. It was found though that alloys aged poorly and could encourage the development of a matrix of oxides on the water surface of the plug, this matrix having a dangerously high melting point that made the plug inoperable. In 1888 the US Steamboat Inspection Service made a requirement that plugs were to be made of pure banca tin and replaced annually. This avoided lead and also zinc contamination. Zinc contamination was regarded as so serious a problem that the case of the plugs was also changed from brass (a copper-zinc alloy) to a zinc-free copper-tin bronze, to avoid the risk of zinc migrating from the housing into the alloy plug.

=== Plug ageing ===
In the 1920s, investigations by the U.S. Bureau of Standards, in conjunction with the Steamboat Inspection Service, found that in use encrustation and oxidation above the fusible core can increase the melting point of the device and prevent it from working when needed: melting points in excess of 2,000 °F (1,000 °C) in used examples have been found. Typical current practice in locomotives requires new plugs to be inspected after "15 to 30 working days (dependent upon water condition and use of locomotive) or at least once every six months," depending on the boiler operating pressure and temperature.

== Other applications ==
The principle of the fusible plug is also applied to the transport of liquefied petroleum gases, where fusible plugs (or small, exposed patches of the containers' lining membrane) are designed to melt or become porous if too high a temperature is reached: a controlled release, at a typical temperature of 250 °F (120 °C), is preferable to an explosive release (a "BLEVE") at a higher temperature. Corrosive gas containers, such as those used for liquid chlorine, are fitted with one or more fusible plugs with an operating temperature of about 158 to 165 °F (70 to 74 °C).

Fusible plugs are common in aircraft wheels, typically in larger or high-performance aircraft. The very large thermal loads imposed by abnormal landing and braking conditions (such as a high-speed rejected takeoff, where an aircraft heavy with fuel must brake hard from a very high speed to a stop in a relatively short distance) can cause the already high pressure in the tyres to rise to the point that the tyre might burst, so fusible plugs are used as a relief mechanism. The vented gas may be directed to cool the braking surfaces.

Fusible plugs are sometimes fitted to the receivers of air compressors as a precaution against the ignition of any lubricating oil vapour that might be present. Should the action of the compressor heat the air above a safe temperature the core will melt and release the pressure.

Automobile air conditioning systems were commonly fitted with fusible plugs, operating at 212–230 °F (100–110 °C). However, due to concerns about the environmental effects of any released refrigerant gas, this function has been taken over by an electrical switch.

A patented type of fireproof safe uses a fusible plug to douse its contents with water if the external temperature gets too high; the patent was published in 1867.

Fusible plugs enhance the safety of liquid fluoride thorium reactors by preventing overheating of the reactor. In the event that a limit temperature is reached, a fusible plug placed at the bottom of the reactor melts, allowing the fluid reactor fuel to drain into underground storage tanks, preventing nuclear meltdown.

== See also ==
- Boiler explosion
