= Bombay Spinning and Weaving Company =

First cotton mill in Bombay, India

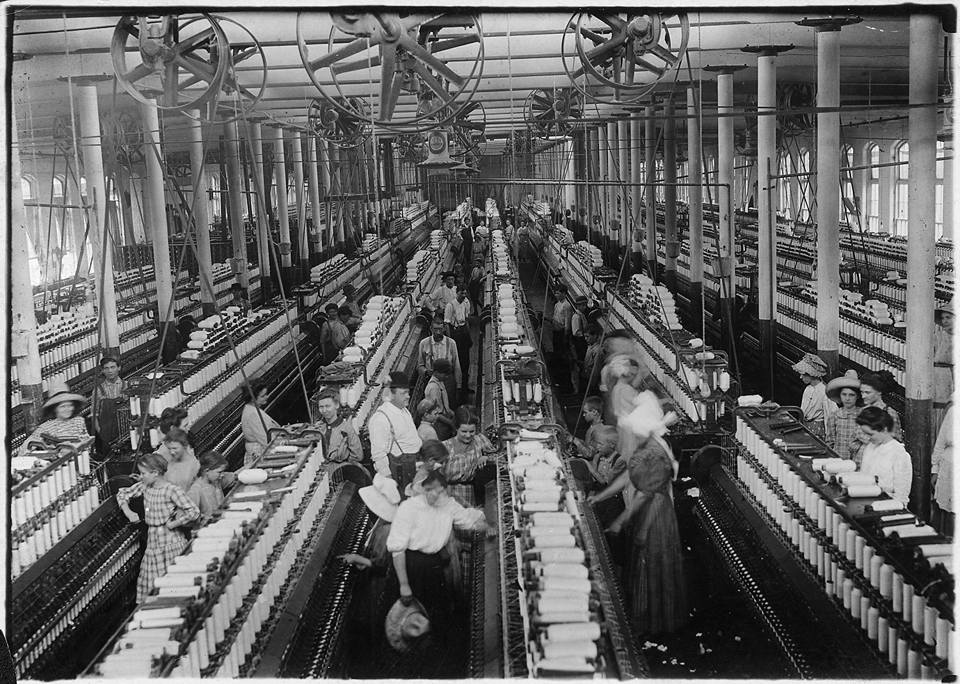
- Inside Bombay spinning and weaving company
- Industry: Textile
- Founded: July 7, 1854
- Founder: Cowaszee Nanabhoy Davar
- Headquarters: Tardeo, Bombay (now Mumbai), India
- Products: Cotton textiles

Bombay Spinning and Weaving Company was the first cotton mill to be established in Bombay, India, on 7 July 1854 at Tardeo by Cowaszee Nanabhoy Davar (1815–73) and his associates. The company was designed by Sir William Fairbaim. This mill began production on 7 February 1856 under the supervision of British engineers and skilled cotton operatives.

== See also ==
- Kawasajee Nanabhoy Davar
