= Cowaszee Nanabhoy Davar =

Indian businessman known for his pioneering efforts in the Indian cotton industry

Cowasjee Nanabhai Davar(1815–1873) is known for his pioneering efforts in laying the foundation of the cotton industry in India. He established multiple cotton mills in India. The first was Bombay Spinning and Weaving Company, and another was the Bombay Throstle mill company in Bombay.

He is credited with laying the foundation work of cotton mill production in India.

== Banking ==
Cowasjee was from a Parsi capitalist and a prestigious family, and He joined the family broking business when he was sixteen only. Cowasjee was compared with Tatas then. He contributed to the banking sector in 1853. He was associated with banks such as Commercial bank and Orient.

== Bombay Spinning and weaving Company ==
The first mill he established in 1854 at Tardeo, a neighboring place near South Bombay. The project commissioning was started on 7 July 1854 and completed in January 1856. And the mill production with 17000 spindles was initiated just after a month of starting (February 1856). Mr. Edwin Heycock was his close associate in this.

Bombay Spinning and weaving company was India's second mill after James London's mill, which was the first in India taken over by Broach Cotton Mills company, started production in October 1855. This company was at Umzad Bhag Bharuch.

== Bombay Throstle mill company ==
Bombay Throstle mill company was the second cotton mill he established in 1856 immediately after the first one. This mill was with higher capacity, i.e., 20000 spindles. Late in 1859, this company was named Alliance Spinning and Weaving Mill.

During this time Cowaszee maintained a close relation with J Galloway .

Throstle spinning is outdated now it was replaced by ring spinning which was introduced later.

- The ring frame developed from the throstle frame, which in its turn was a descendant of Arkwright's water frame.

== See also ==
- Bombay Spinning and Weaving Company
- Bombay Presidency
- Throstle frame
