= Minerva (1834 ship) =

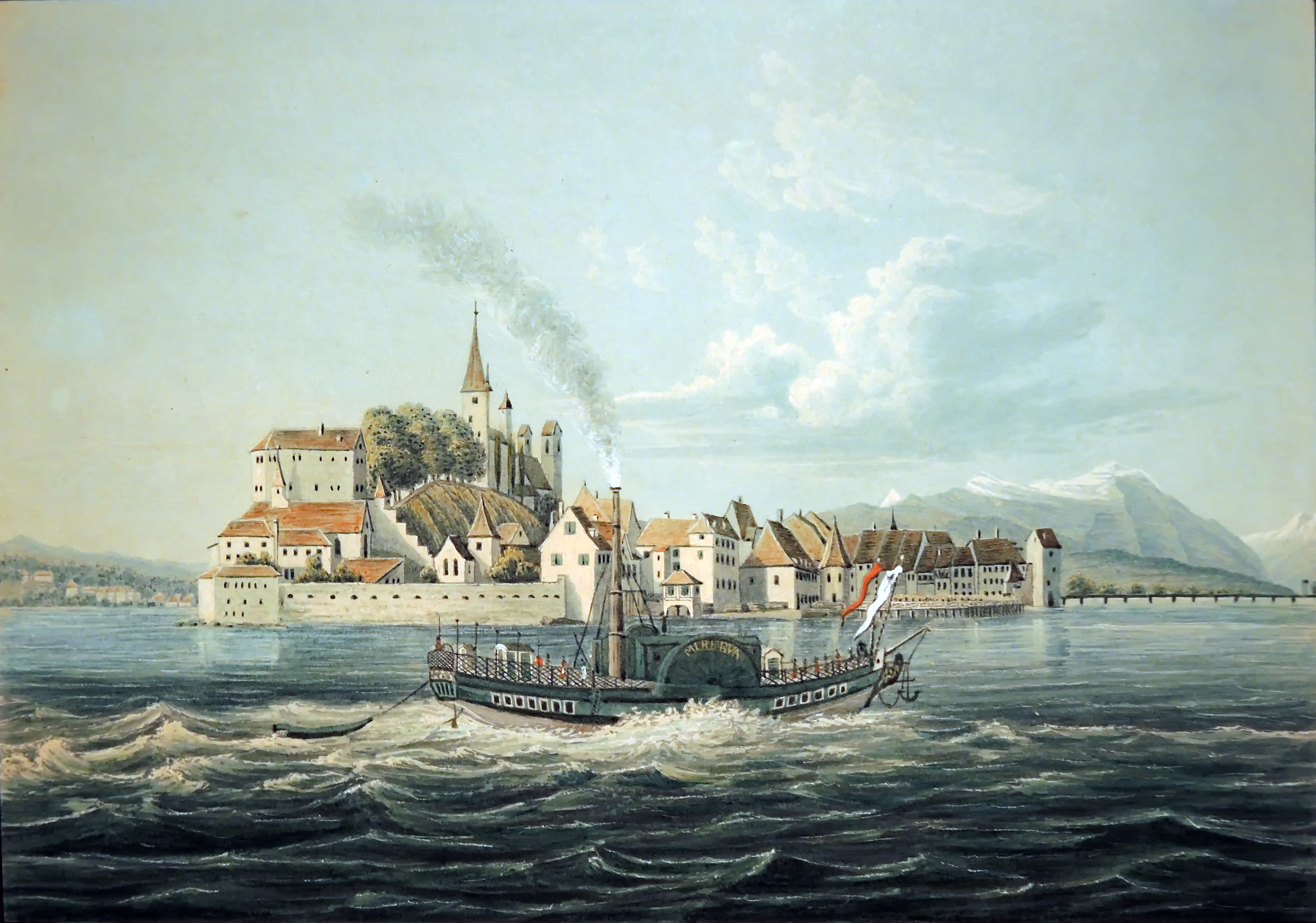
An aquatint by Jakob Hausheer of Minerva passing Rapperswil on Lake Zurich

Minerva, later known as Spliigen, was the first paddle steamer to operate on Lake Zurich in Switzerland. She was named after the goddess Minerva.

Franz Carl Caspar and Johann Jakob Lämmlin ordered Minerva in 1834 from William Fairbairn & Sons of Manchester, England. After construction, she was broken down into pieces and sent to Hull, where she was put together and made the voyage to Rotterdam and thence up the Rhine to the Rhine Falls. She was again dismantled and carried overland to Lake Zurich, where she was reassembled for the second time.

Minerva had an iron hull measuring 98 ft (30 m) in length, 15.5 ft (4.7 m) in width, and 7 ft (2.1 m) in draught. She was powered by a steam engine of 40 hp (30 kW).

Minerva's first scheduled voyage on Lake Zurich took place on 19 July 1835. In 1839 she was moved to Lake Walen, where she continued to operate until 1860. In 1848 Minerva was renamed Spliigen. After 1860, Spliigen returned to Lake Zurich.
