= Peter Fairbairn =

British politician

Sir Peter Fairbairn (1799–1861) was a Scottish engineer, inventor, and mayor of Leeds, West Yorkshire.

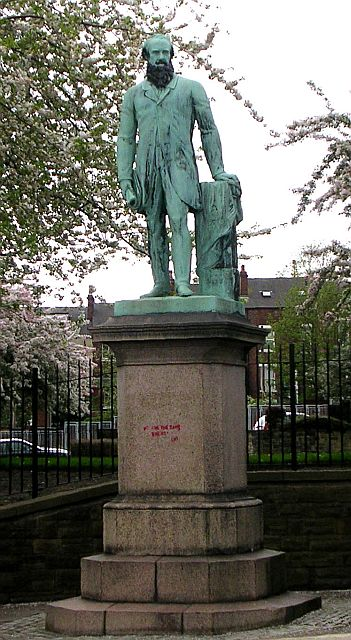
Statue of Sir Peter Fairbairn, in Woodhouse Square, Leeds.

== Early life ==
Peter Fairbairn was the youngest brother of Sir William Fairbairn, born at Kelso in Roxburghshire in September 1799. He had little education, and his father obtained a situation for him in 1811 in the Percy Main colliery at Newcastle-on-Tyne. For three years Peter continued at Percy Main, until, at the age of fourteen, he was apprenticed to a millwright and engineer in Newcastle. He walked every day from Percy Main to Newcastle. During his apprenticeship he made the acquaintance of Henry Houldsworth of Glasgow, a mechanic and constructor of cotton machinery, under whom he was placed as foreman, ultimately being appointed traveller to the firm.

In 1821 he left Houldsworth to take a situation on the continent. In France he stayed a year, acquiring technical knowledge; and after a period in the Manchester establishment of his brother William accepted a partnership with his former employer, Houldsworth.

== Business career ==
In 1828 he left Glasgow and began business in Leeds as a machine maker. He had no capital; but Leeds was then in the first flush of its manufacturing prosperity.

Fairbairn had already devoted attention to flax-spinning machinery, which had been developed in Leeds by Philippe de Girard, a French inventor. Fairbairn suggested an improvement by which the process was simplified and a great saving effected. He proposed to use eighty spindles instead of forty, and to substitute screws for the old 'fallers' and 'gills.' John Anderson, a Glasgow workman, joined him in perfecting the machine, which was constructed in a small room in Lady Lane, Leeds.

John Marshall, a prominent local flax-spinner, promised to replace his old machines with Fairbairn's as fast as they could be turned out. Fairbairn said that he had neither workshop nor money; Marshall encouraged him to take the Wellington foundry at the New Road End, which was then to let. Fairbairn became in time independent of Marshall's support. Further improvements were introduced, and he constructed woollen as well as flax machinery. His improvement in the roving-frame, and his adaptation of what is known as the 'differential motion' to it, his success in working the 'screw gill' motion, and his introduction of the rotary gill, were all factors in the growth of mechanical efficiency.

Other inventions included machines for preparing and spinning silk waste, and improvements in machinery for making rope yarn. The construction engineering tools was later included at the Wellington foundry, and the Crimean War gave an impetus to this branch of the business. Fairbairn constructed large machines, utilised at Woolwich and Enfield, for the purposes of cutting, twisting, boring, and tearing iron and steel: cannon-rifling machines, milling machines, planing and slotting machines, and others. His foundry had become a major concern before his death, on 4 January 1861.

== Public office ==
In 1836 Peter Fairbairn was elected to the Leeds town council, on which he sat until 1842, resigning in that year on account of the increasing demands of his business. In 1854 he was elected an alderman, and, after being appointed a magistrate, was mayor in 1857–8 and 1858–9. Leeds Town Hall was opened by Queen Victoria and Prince Albert during his mayoralty, and Fairbairn, who distinguished himself as a host, received the honour of knighthood.

During his mayoralty the British Association visited Leeds. He presented to the town hall a statue of the queen by Matthew Noble. The inhabitants of Leeds subscribed for a portrait of Fairbairn by Sir Francis Grant, which hung in the council chamber, and for a bronze statue of him by Noble.

== Family ==
Fairbairn was married twice; his first wife, by whom he had one son and two daughters, being Margaret, daughter of Mr. Robert Kennedy of Glasgow, died in 1843. In 1855 he married Rachel Anne, fourth daughter of Robert William Brandling, of Low Gosforth, Newcastle, and widow of Capt. Charles Bell, R.N.; she survived him.
