= Throstle frame =

Yarn spinning machine for cotton, wool, and other fibers

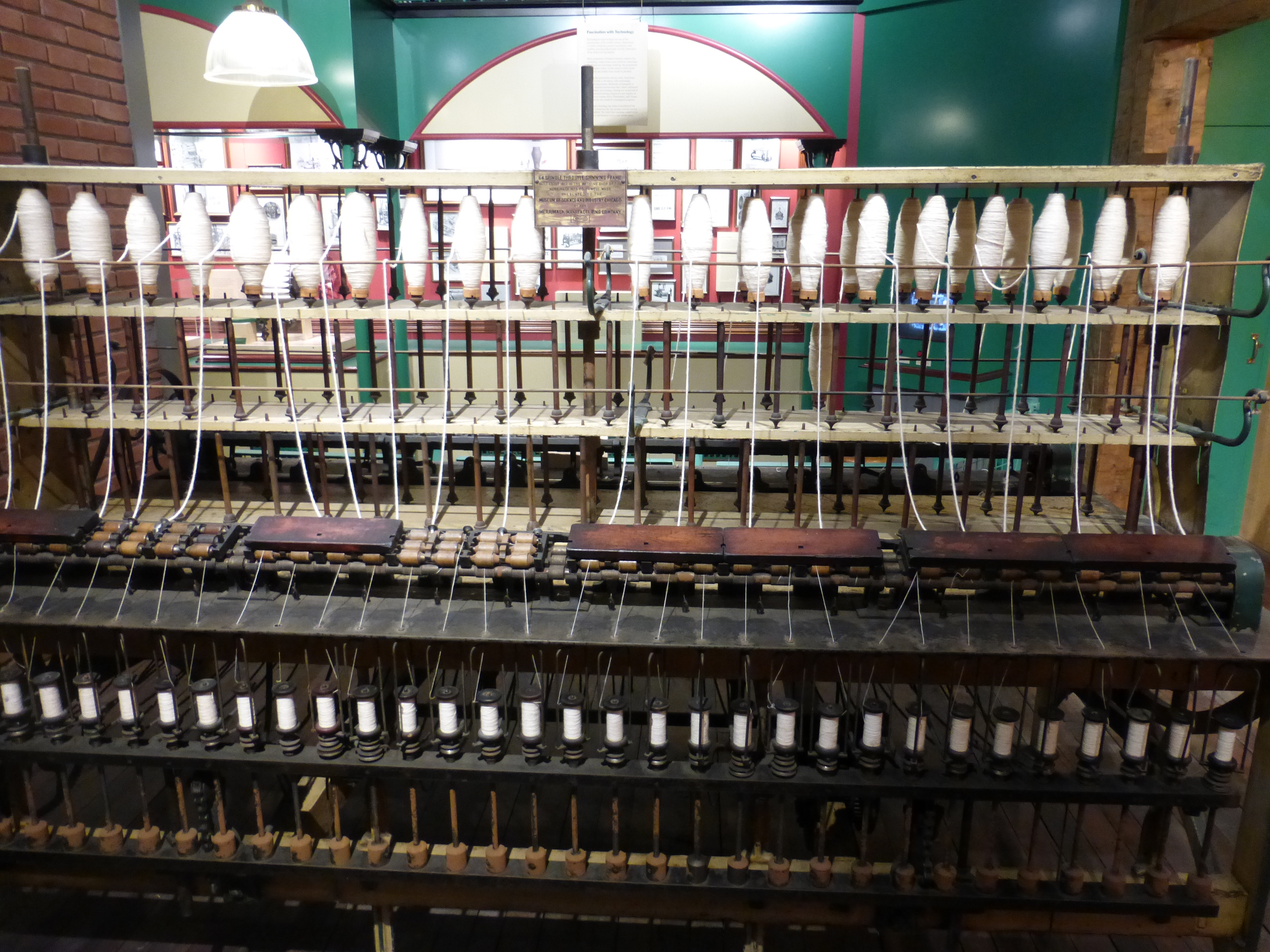
Throstle frame in Lowell, Massachusetts

The throstle frame was a spinning machine for cotton, wool, and other fibers, differing from a mule in having a continuous action, the processes of drawing, twisting, and winding being carried on simultaneously. It derived its name from the "singing or humming which it occasioned," throstle being a dialect name for the song thrush.

== See also ==
- Cowaszee Nanabhoy Davar
