= Radial stress =

Stress in a direction radial to the axis of symmetry

Radial stress is stress toward or away from the central axis of a component. It's a component of cylinder stress.

== Pressure vessels ==
The walls of pressure vessels generally undergo triaxial loading. For cylindrical pressure vessels, the normal loads on a wall element are longitudinal stress, circumferential (hoop) stress and radial stress.

The radial stress for a thick-walled cylinder is equal and opposite to the gauge pressure on the inside surface, and zero on the outside surface. The circumferential stress and longitudinal stresses are usually much larger for pressure vessels, and so for thin-walled instances, radial stress is usually neglected.

== Formula ==
The radial stress for a thick walled pipe at a point $r$ from the central axis is given by

$$\sigma_r(r) = \frac{p_i r_i^2 - p_o r_o^2}{r_o^2 - r_i^2}+\frac{r_i^2 r_o^2 (p_o - p_i)}{r^2 (r_o^2 - r_i^2)}\$$

where $r_i$ is the inner radius, $r_o$ is the outer radius, $p_i$ is the inner absolute pressure and $p_o$ is the outer absolute pressure. Maximum radial stress occurs when $r = r_i$ (at the inside surface) and is equal to gauge pressure, or $p_i - p_o$.
