= Fairbairn baronets =

Baronetcy in the Baronetage of the United Kingdom

The Fairbairn Baronetcy, of Ardwick in the parish of Manchester in the County Palatine of Lancaster, is a title in the Baronetage of the United Kingdom. It was created on 2 November 1869 for the prominent Scottish engineer William Fairbairn. Another member of the family to gain distinction was Bernard Fairbairn (1880–1965), grandson of William Andrew Fairbairn, fourth son of the first Baronet. He was a vice-admiral in the Royal Navy.

== Fairbairn baronets, of Ardwick (1869) ==
Escutcheon of the Fairbairn baronets of Ardwick

- Sir William Fairbairn, 1st Baronet (1789–1874)
- Sir Thomas Fairbairn, 2nd Baronet (1823–1891)
- Sir Arthur Henderson Fairbairn, 3rd Baronet (1852–1915)
- Sir Thomas Gordon Fairbairn, 4th Baronet (1854–1931)
- Sir William Albert Fairbairn, 5th Baronet (1902–1972)
- Sir James Brooke Fairbairn, 6th Baronet (1930–2017)
- Sir Robert William Fairbairn, 7th Baronet (born 1965)

The heir apparent is the current holder's elder son, Jack Edmund Brooke Fairbairn (born 1995).
