= Manchester Steam Users' Association =

By the 1840s, thousands of high-pressure boilers were used in the United Kingdom. However, many boilers were poorly constructed and not well-managed or maintained once installed. Boilers could explode suddenly and powerfully, sending debris flying into nearby streets or fields. In the 1860s, nearly 500 explosions were recorded, causing over 700 deaths and 900 injuries.

In 1854, engineers and mill owners met in Manchester to form an organisation to deal with the growing number of boiler explosions. Those present included William Fairbairn and Joseph Whitworth. In 1855 they officially founded the Association for the Prevention of Steam Boiler Explosions and for Effecting Economy in the Raising and Use of Steam. This later became known as the Manchester Steam Users Association or MSUA.

The primary purpose of the MSUA was to provide 'the increased security against explosions, which a periodical inspection by an experienced engineer affords, and the saving of fuel which may be expected from the inspection of an intelligent officer well acquainted with the principle on which perfect combustion depends'.
