= William Alexander Fairbairn =

Scottish forester and ornithologist

William Alexander Fairbairn FRSE MBOU (died 1984) was a Scottish forester and ornithologist. He was a co-founder of the Central Forestry Examination Board.

== Life ==
He was born around 1902 in Edinburgh. He was educated at George Heriot's School then attended the University of Edinburgh graduating with a BSc in 1924. He then spent a year at Trinity College, Oxford undertaking their Colonial Probationers Course. During both his school and university years he was a keen rugby player, including taking part in an international match in France in 1925. In the autumn of 1925 he was posted to Nigeria as part of the Colonial Forest Service. In the 1930s he made several trips into the Sahara for research purposes.

In the Second World War he served in the Royal West African Frontier Force (RWAFF), Nigerian Regiment, later rising to be an intelligence officer at the rank of captain. He retired from the Colonial Forest Service in 1948 and obtained a post as lecturer in forestry at the University of Edinburgh, holding this position until 1967, when he fully retired. The University of Edinburgh had awarded him an honorary doctorate (DSc) for his reports on vegetation in arid areas in 1944.

In 1955 he was elected a Fellow of the Royal Society of Edinburgh. His proposers were Mark Loudon Anderson, Robert Grant, James Ritchie and C. T. R. Wilson.

He died on 28 November 1984 aged 82.

== Family ==
He married Margaret Stevenson whom he met through her brothers who were fellow students whilst he studied forestry.

== Publications ==
- Some Common Birds of West Africa (1933)
- Some Game Birds of West Africa (1952)
