= Boiler explosion =

Catastrophic failure of a boiler

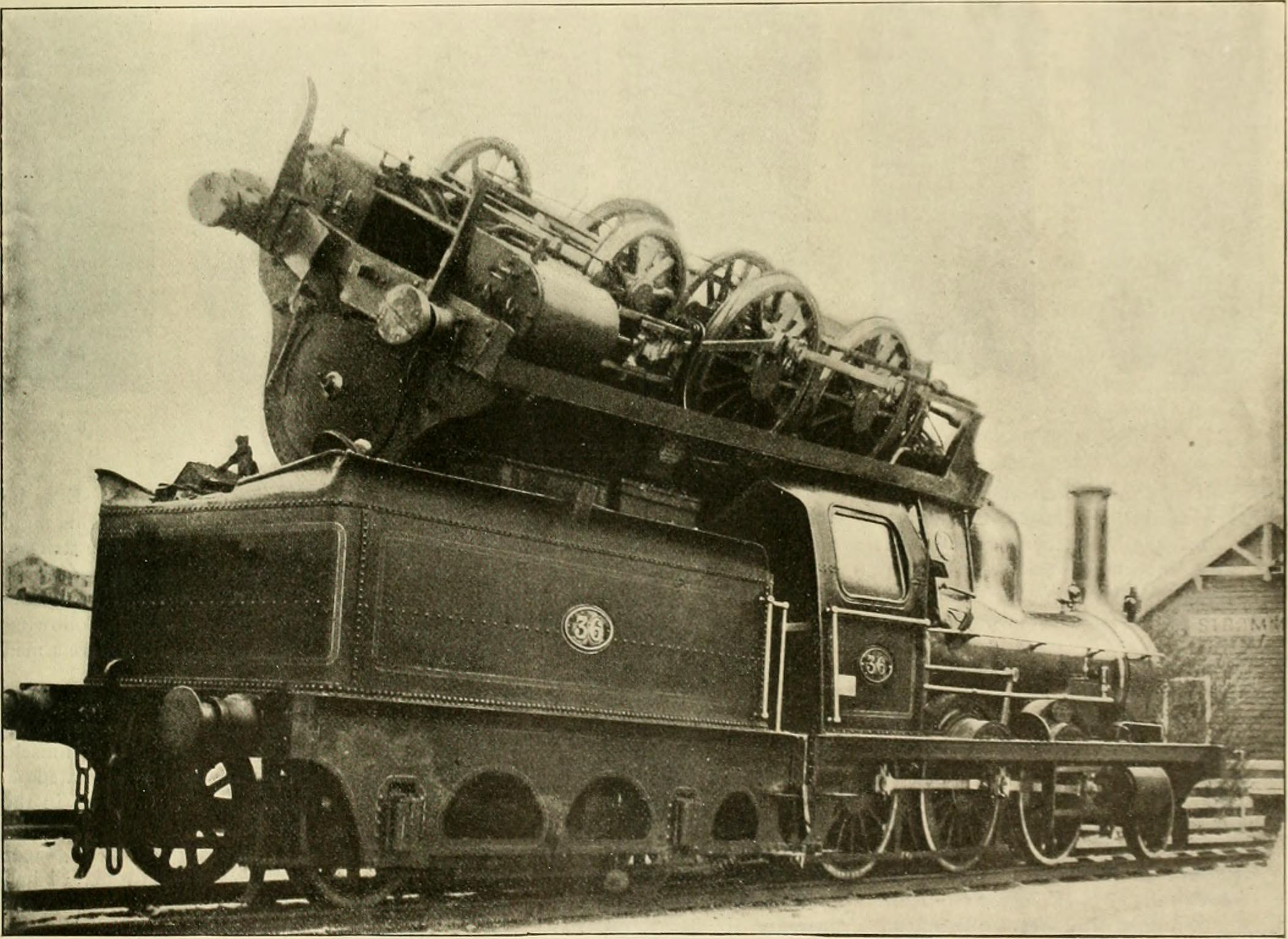
The aftermath of a boiler explosion at Strømmen station near Oslo, Norway, 22 December 1888. One locomotive was thrown into the air and landed on the roof of another; the crews of both escaped without injury.

A boiler explosion is a catastrophic failure of a boiler.

There are two types of boiler explosions. One type is a failure of the pressure parts of the steam and water sides. There can be many different causes, such as failure of the safety valve, corrosion of critical parts of the boiler, or low water level. Corrosion along the edges of lap joints was a common cause of early boiler explosions. In steam locomotive boilers, as knowledge was gained by trial and error in early days, the explosive situations and consequent damage due to explosions were inevitable. However, improved design and maintenance markedly reduced the number of boiler explosions by the end of the 19th century. Further improvements continued in the 20th century. On land-based boilers, explosions of the pressure systems happened regularly in stationary steam boilers in the Victorian era, but are now very rare because of the various protections provided, and because of regular inspections compelled by governmental and industry requirements.

The second kind is a fuel/air explosion in the furnace, which would more properly be termed a firebox explosion. Firebox explosions in solid-fuel-fired boilers are rare, but firebox explosions in gas or oil-fired boilers are still a potential hazard.

== Principle ==
=== Boiler steam explosions ===
Many shell-type boilers carry a large bath of liquid water which is heated to a higher temperature and pressure (enthalpy) than boiling water would be at atmospheric pressure. During normal operation, the liquid water remains in the bottom of the boiler due to gravity, steam bubbles rise through the liquid water and collect at the top for use until saturation pressure is reached, then the boiling stops. If some pressure is released, boiling begins again, and so on.

If steam is released normally, say by opening a throttle valve, the bubbling action of the water remains moderate and relatively dry steam can be drawn from the highest point in the vessel.

If steam is released more quickly, the more vigorous boiling action that results can throw a fine spray of droplets up as "wet steam" which can cause damage to piping, engines, turbines and other equipment downstream.

If a large crack or other opening in the boiler vessel allows the internal pressure to drop very suddenly, the heat energy remaining in the water will cause even more of the liquid to flash into steam bubbles, which then rapidly displace the remaining liquid. The potential energy of the escaping steam and water are now transformed into work, just as they would have done in an engine; with enough force to peel back the material around the break, severely distorting the shape of the plate which was formerly held in place by stays, or self-supported by its original cylindrical shape. The rapid release of steam and water can provide a very potent blast, and cause great damage to surrounding property or personnel. A failure of this type qualifies as a boiling liquid expanding vapor explosion (BLEVE).

The rapidly expanding steam bubbles can also perform work by throwing large "slugs" of water inside the boiler in the direction of the opening, and at astonishing velocities. A fast-moving mass of water carries a great deal of kinetic energy, and in collision with the shell of the boiler results in a violent destructive effect. This can greatly enlarge the original rupture, or tear the shell in two.

Many plumbers, firefighters, and steamfitters are aware of this phenomenon, which is called "water hammer". A several-ounce "slug" of water passing through a steam line at high velocity and striking a 90-degree elbow can instantly fracture a fitting that is otherwise capable of handling several times the normal static pressure. It can then be understood that a few hundred, or even a few thousand pounds of water moving at the same velocity inside a boiler shell can easily blow out a tube sheet, collapse a firebox, even toss the entire boiler a surprising distance through reaction as the water exits the boiler, like the recoil of a heavy cannon firing a ball.

Several accounts of the SL-1 experimental reactor accident vividly describe the incredibly powerful effect of water hammer on a pressure vessel:

The expansion caused by this heating process caused water hammer as water was accelerated upwards toward the reactor vessel head, producing approximately 10,000 pounds per square inch (69,000 kPa) of pressure on the head of the reactor vessel when water struck the head at 160 feet per second (50 m/s) ... This extreme form of water hammer propelled control rods, shield plugs, and the entire reactor vessel upward. A later investigation concluded that the 26,000-pound (12,000 kg) vessel had jumped 9 feet 1 inch (2.77 m) and the upper control rod drive mechanisms had struck the ceiling of the reactor building prior to settling back into its original location.

A steam locomotive operating at 350 psi (2,400 kPa) would have a temperature of about 220 °C (400 °F), and a specific enthalpy of 960 kJ/kg (440 kJ/lb). Since standard pressure saturated water has a specific enthalpy of just 420 kJ/kg (190 kJ/lb), the difference between the two specific enthalpies, 540 kJ/kg (240 kJ/lb), is the total energy expended in the explosion. So in the case of a large locomotive which can hold as much as 10,000 kg (22,000 lb) of water at a high pressure and temperature state, this explosion would have a theoretical energy release equal to about 1,200 kilograms (2,600 lb) of TNT.

=== Firebox explosions ===
In the case of a firebox explosion, these typically occur after a burner flameout. Oil fumes, natural gas, propane, coal, or any other fuel can build up inside the combustion chamber. This is especially of concern when the vessel is hot; the fuels will rapidly volatilize due to the temperature. Once the lower explosive limit (LEL) is reached, any source of ignition will cause an explosion of the vapors.

A fuel explosion within the confines of the firebox may damage the pressurized boiler tubes and interior shell, potentially triggering structural failure, steam or water leakage, and/or a secondary boiler shell failure and steam explosion.

A common form of minor firebox "explosion" is known as "drumming" and can occur with any type of fuel. Instead of the normal "roar" of the fire, a rhythmic series of "thumps" and flashes of fire below the grate and through the firedoor indicate that the combustion of the fuel is proceeding through a rapid series of detonations, caused by an inappropriate air/fuel mixture with regard to the level of draft available. This usually causes no damage in locomotive type boilers, but can cause cracks in masonry boiler settings if allowed to continue.

==== Grooving ====
The plates of early locomotive boilers were joined by simple overlapping joints. This practice was satisfactory for the annular joints, running around the boiler, but in longitudinal joints, along the length of the boiler, the overlap of the plates diverted the boiler cross-section from its ideal circular shape. Under pressure the boiler strained to reach, as nearly as possible, the circular cross-section. Because the double-thickness overlap was stronger than the surrounding metal, the repeated bending and release caused by the variations in boiler pressure caused internal cracks, or grooves (deep pitting), along the length of the joint. The cracks offered a starting point for internal corrosion, which could hasten failure. It was eventually found that this internal corrosion could be reduced by using plates of sufficient size so that no joints were situated below the water level. Eventually the simple lap seam was replaced by the single or double butt-strap seams, which do not suffer from this defect.

Due to the constant expansion and contraction of the firebox a similar form of "stress corrosion" can take place at the ends of staybolts where they enter the firebox plates, and is accelerated by poor water quality. Often referred to as "necking", this type of corrosion can reduce the strength of the staybolts until they are incapable of supporting the firebox at normal pressure.

Grooving (deep, localized pitting) also occurs near the waterline, particularly in boilers that are fed with water that has not been de-aerated or treated with oxygen scavenging agents. All "natural" sources of water contain dissolved air, which is released as a gas when the water is heated. The air (which contains oxygen) collects in a layer near the surface of the water and greatly accelerates corrosion of the boiler plates in that area.

==== Firebox ====
The intricate shape of a locomotive firebox, whether made of soft copper or of steel, can only resist the steam pressure on its internal walls if these are supported by stays attached to internal girders and the outer walls. They are liable to fail through fatigue (because the inner and outer walls expand at different rates under the heat of the fire), from corrosion, or from wasting as the heads of the stays exposed to the fire are burned away. If the stays fail the firebox will explode inwards. Regular visual inspection, internally and externally, is employed to prevent this. Even a well-maintained firebox will fail explosively if the water level in the boiler is allowed to fall far enough to leave the top plate of the firebox (crown sheet) uncovered. This can occur when crossing the summit of the hill, as the water flows to the front part of the boiler and can expose the firebox crown sheet. The majority of locomotive explosions are firebox explosions caused by such crown sheet uncovering.

== Causes ==
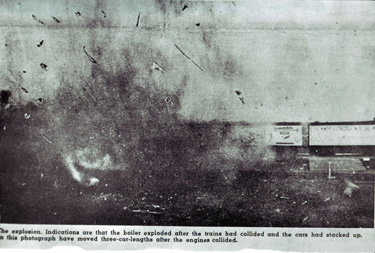
In the Crash at Crush, Texas, 1896, two locomotives crashed into one another for a publicity stunt. Both boilers exploded, causing two deaths and many more injuries as a result of the explosions sending flying debris into the crowd.

There are many causes for boiler explosions such as poor water treatment causing scaling and over heating of the plates, low water level, a stuck safety valve, or even a furnace explosion that in turn, if severe enough, can cause a boiler explosion. Poor operator training resulting in neglect or other mishandling of the boiler has been a frequent cause of explosions since the beginning of the industrial revolution. In the late 19th and early 20th century, the inspection records of various sources in the U.S., UK, and Europe showed that the most frequent cause of boiler explosions was weakening of boilers through simple rusting, by anywhere from two to five times more than all other causes.

Before materials science, inspection standards, and quality control caught up with the rapidly growing boiler manufacturing industry, a significant number of boiler explosions were directly traceable to poor design, workmanship, and undetected flaws in poor quality materials. The alarming frequency of boiler failures in the U.S. due to defects in materials and design were attracting the attention of international engineering standards organizations, such as the ASME, which established their first Boiler Testing Code in 1884. The boiler explosion that caused the Grover Shoe Factory disaster in Brockton, Massachusetts, on 10 March 1905, resulted in 58 deaths and 150 injuries, and inspired the state of Massachusetts to publish its first boiler laws in 1908.

Several written sources provide a concise description of the causes of boiler explosions:

The principal causes of explosions, in fact the only causes, are deficiency of strength in the shell or other parts of the boilers, over-pressure and over-heating. Deficiency of strength in steam boilers may be due to original defects, bad workmanship, deterioration from use or mismanagement.

And:

Cause. —Boiler explosions are always due to the fact that some part of the boiler is, for some reason, too weak to withstand the pressure to which it is subjected. This may be due to one of two causes: Either the boiler is not strong enough to safely carry its proper working pressure, or else the pressure has been allowed to rise above the usual point by the sticking of the safety valves, or some similar cause.

=== Early investigations into causes ===
The stationary steam engines used to power machinery first came to prominence during the Industrial Revolution, and in the early days there were many boiler explosions from a variety of causes. One of the first investigators of the problem was William Fairbairn, who helped establish the first insurance company dealing with the losses such explosions could cause. He also established experimentally that the hoop stress in a cylindrical pressure vessel like a boiler was twice the longitudinal stress. (Note: Fairbairn's theoretical calculation assumes that the cylindrical vessel is much longer than its diameter. In practice, this is a viable approximation for any boiler that is a right cylinder or longer. Even for a short, squat boiler such as the Scotch, the reduced end area due to the tubes and their staying effect on the end-plates means that the principal stress is still this hoop stress.) Such investigations helped him and others explain the importance of stress concentrations in weakening boilers.

While deterioration and mishandling are probably the most common causes of boiler explosions, the actual mechanism of a catastrophic boiler failure was not well documented until extensive experimentation was undertaken by U.S. boiler inspectors in the early 20th century. Several different attempts were made to cause a boiler to explode by various means, but one of the most interesting experiments demonstrated that in certain circumstances, if a sudden opening in the boiler allowed steam to escape too rapidly, water hammer could cause destruction of the entire pressure vessel:

A cylindrical boiler was tested and withstood a steam pressure of 300 pounds (300 psi or 2,068 kPa) without injury. ... When the [discharge] valve was suddenly opened at a pressure of 235 pounds [235 psi or 1,620 kPa] the boiler gave way, the iron being twisted and torn into fragments and thrown in all directions. The reason for this was that the sudden rush of steam from the boiler into the discharge pipe reduced the pressure in the boiler very rapidly. This reduction of pressure caused the sudden formation of a great quantity of steam within the water, and the heavy mass of water being thrown with great violence toward the opening whence the steam was being withdrawn, struck the portions of the boiler near that opening and caused the fracture.

But the highly destructive mechanism of water hammer in boiler explosions was understood long before then, as D. K. Clark wrote on 10 February 1860, in a letter to the editors of Mechanics Magazine:

The sudden dispersion and projection of the water in the boiler against the bounding surfaces of the boiler is the great cause of the violence of the results: the dispersion, being caused by the momentary generation of steam throughout the mass of the water, and in its efforts to escape, it carries the water before it, and the combined momentum of the steam and the water carries them like shot through and amongst the bounding surfaces, and deforms or shatters them in a manner not to be accounted for by simple overpressure or by simple momentum of steam.

Boiler explosions are common in sinking ships once the hot boiler touches cold sea water, as the sudden cooling of the hot metal causes it to crack; for instance, when the SS Benlomond was torpedoed by a U-boat, the torpedoes and resulting boiler explosion caused the ship to go down in two minutes, leaving Poon Lim as the only survivor in a complement of 53 crew.

== In locomotives ==
Boiler explosions are of a particular danger in (locomotive-type) fire tube boilers because the top of the firebox (crown sheet) must be covered with some amount of water at all times; or the heat of the fire can weaken the crown sheet or crown stays to the point of failure, even at normal working pressure.

This was the cause of the Gettysburg Railroad firebox explosion near Gardners, Pennsylvania, in 1995, where low water allowed the front of the crown sheet to overheat until the regular crown stays pulled through the sheet, releasing a great deal of steam and water under full boiler pressure into the firebox. The crown sheet design included several alternating rows of button-head safety stays, which limited the failure of the crown sheet to the first five or six rows of conventional stays, preventing a collapse of the entire crown sheet.

This type of failure is not limited to railway engines, as locomotive-type boilers have been used for traction engines, portable engines, skid engines used for mining or logging, stationary engines for sawmills and factories, for heating, and as package boilers providing steam for other processes. In all applications, maintaining the proper water level is essential for safe operation.

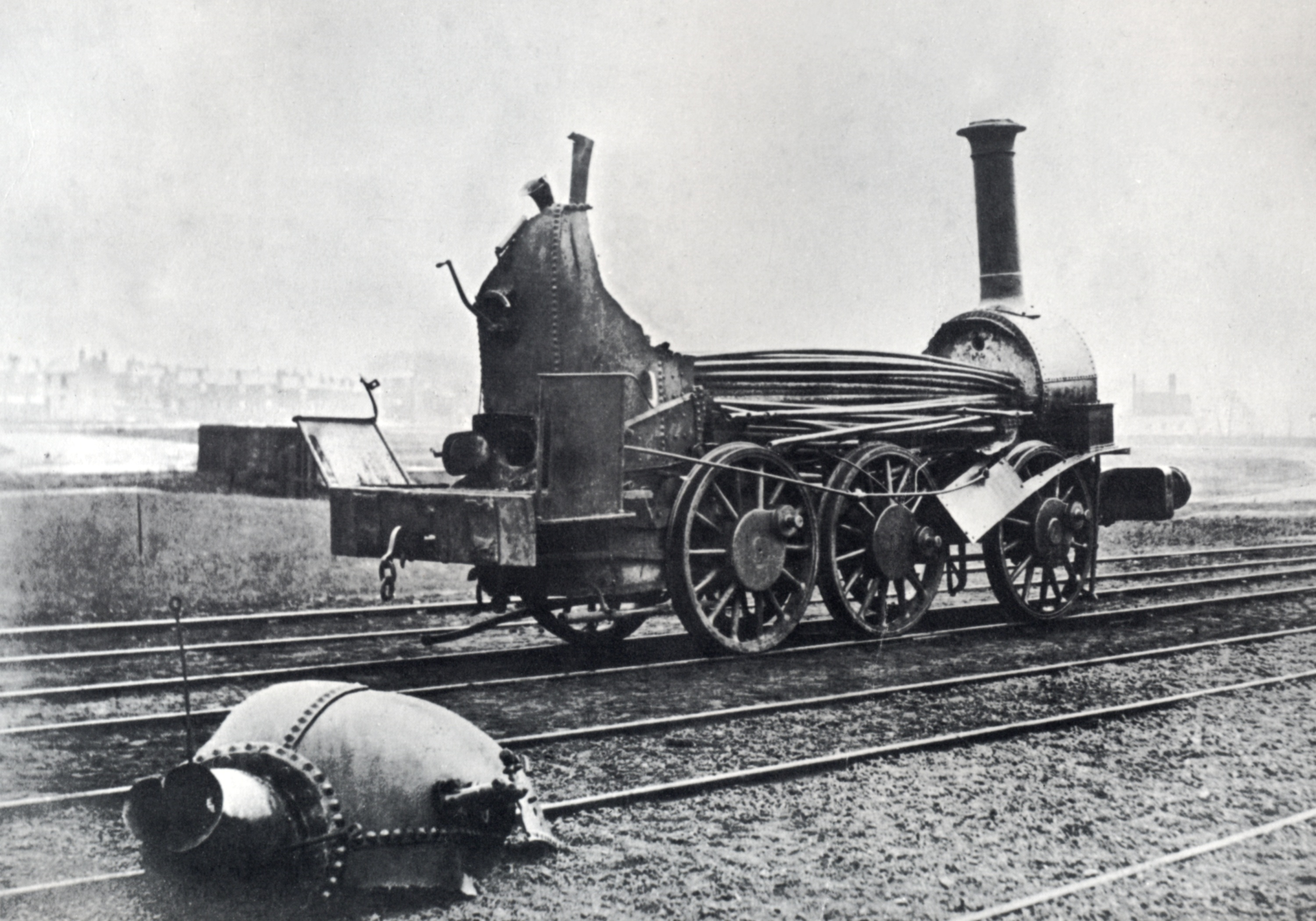
Aftermath of a boiler explosion on a railway locomotive circa 1850.

Hewison (1983) gives a comprehensive account of British locomotive boiler explosions, listing 137 between 1815 and 1962. It is noteworthy that 122 of these were in the 19th century and only 15 in the 20th century.

Boiler explosions generally fell into two categories. The first is the breakage of the boiler barrel itself, through weakness/damage or excessive internal pressure, resulting in sudden discharge of steam over a wide area. Stress corrosion cracking at the lap joints was a common cause of early boiler explosions, probably caused by caustic embrittlement. The water used in boilers was not often closely controlled, and if acidic, could corrode the wrought iron boiler plates. Galvanic corrosion was an additional problem where copper and iron were in contact. Boiler plates have been thrown up to a quarter of a mile (Hewison, Rolt). The second type is the collapse of the firebox under steam pressure from the adjoining boiler, releasing flames and hot gases into the cab. Improved design and maintenance almost totally eliminated the first type, but the second type is always possible if the driver and fireman do not maintain the water level in the boiler.

Boiler barrels could explode if the internal pressure became too high. To prevent this, safety valves were installed to release the pressure at a set level. Early examples were spring-loaded, but John Ramsbottom invented a tamper-proof valve which was universally adopted. The other common cause of explosions was internal corrosion which weakened the boiler barrel so that it could not withstand normal operating pressure. In particular, grooves could occur along horizontal seams (lap joints) below water level. Dozens of explosions resulted, but were eliminated by 1900 by the adoption of butt joints, plus improved maintenance schedules and regular hydraulic testing.

Fireboxes were generally made of copper, though later locomotives had steel fireboxes. They were held to the outer part of the boiler by stays (numerous small supports). Parts of the firebox in contact with full steam pressure have to be kept covered with water, to stop them overheating and weakening. The usual cause of firebox collapses is that the boiler water level falls too low and the top of the firebox (crown sheet) becomes uncovered and overheats. This occurs if the fireman has failed to maintain water level or the level indicator (gauge glass) is faulty. A less common reason is breakage of large numbers of stays, due to corrosion or unsuitable material.

Throughout the 20th century, two boiler barrel failures and thirteen firebox collapses occurred in the UK. The boiler barrel failures occurred at Cardiff in 1909 and Buxton in 1921; both were caused by misassembly of the safety valves causing the boilers to exceed their design pressures. Of the 13 firebox collapses, four were due to broken stays, one to scale buildup on the firebox, and the rest were due to low water level.

== Steamboat boilers ==
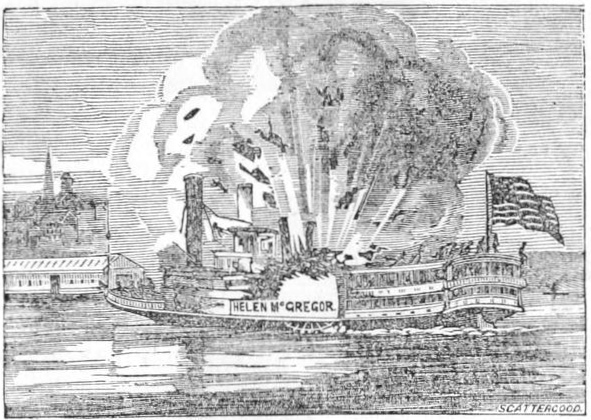
Steamboat explodes in Memphis, Tennessee, in 1830

The Pennsylvania was a side wheeler steamboat which suffered a boiler explosion in the Mississippi River and sank at Ship Island near Memphis, Tennessee, on 13 June 1858. Of the 450 passengers on board more than 250 died, including Henry Clemens, the younger brother of the author Mark Twain.

SS Ada Hancock, a small steamboat used to transfer passengers and cargo to and from the large coastal steamships that stopped in San Pedro Harbor in the early 1860s, suffered disaster when its boiler exploded violently in San Pedro Bay, the port of Los Angeles, near Wilmington, California, on 27 April 1863, killing twenty-six people and injuring many others of the fifty-three or more passengers on board.

The steamboat Sultana was destroyed in an explosion on 27 April 1865, resulting in the greatest maritime disaster in United States history. An estimated 1,549 passengers were killed when three of the ship's four boilers exploded and the Sultana burned and sank not far from Memphis, Tennessee. The cause was traced to a poorly executed repair to the shell of one boiler; the patch failed, and debris from that boiler ruptured two more.

Another US Civil War steamboat explosion was the steamer Eclipse on 27 January 1865, which was carrying members of the 9th Indiana Artillery. One official record reports 10 killed and 68 injured; a later report mentions that 27 were killed and 78 wounded. Fox's Regimental Losses reports 29 killed.

The boiler of Canada's PS Waubuno may have exploded on the ship's final voyage in 1879, though the cause of the sinking remains unknown. An explosion could have occurred due to negligent upkeep or to contact with the cold water of Georgian Bay while foundering in a storm.

== Modern boilers ==
Modern boilers are designed with redundant pumps, valves, water level monitors, fuel cutoffs, automated controls, and pressure relief valves. In addition, the construction must adhere to strict engineering guidelines set by the relevant authorities. The NBIC, ASME, and others attempt to ensure safe boiler designs by publishing detailed standards. The result is a boiler unit which is less prone to catastrophic accidents.

Also improving safety is the increasing use of "package boilers". These are boilers which are built at a factory then shipped out as a complete unit to the job site. These typically have better quality and fewer issues than boilers which are site assembled tube-by-tube. A package boiler only needs the final connections to be made (electrical, breaching, condensate lines, etc.) to complete the installation.

=== Key safety developments ===
| Year | Event/Activity | Type | Country | Description |
|---|---|---|---|---|
| 1840 | Henry R. Worthington invents boiler feed water pump | Equipment | United States | Automatic boiler feed water system enabling adding water to a boiler while at operating pressure. |
| 1847 | Institution of Mechanical Engineers | Technical society | United Kingdom | IMechE formed, emphasizing the importance of specialized mechanical knowledge, particularly with respect to steam power (see also Institution of Civil Engineers). |
| 1855 | Steam Users' Association | Technical society | United Kingdom | In Manchester, the Association for the Prevention of Steam Boiler Explosions, and for effecting Economy in the Raising and Use of Steam is formed and, eschewing direct regulation, advocates creation of trained inspectors. Later adds the prefix "Manchester Steam Users' ..." to the name. |
| 1855 | Ramsbottom safety valve | Equipment | United Kingdom | John Ramsbottom invented a tamperproof safety valve. |
| 1864 | Bengal Act VI of 1864 | Legislation | India | Provided for the inspection of steam boilers in and around Kolkata. |
| 1866 | The Hartford Steam Boiler Inspection and Insurance Company | Commercial | United States | The first boiler insurance company in the U.S. is established in Hartford, Connecticut. |
| 1866 | Gesellschaft zur Überwachung und Versicherung von Dampfkesseln | Technical society | Germany | In response to a brewery explosion, a private society is founded to offer boiler inspections to its members. It is highly successful and later becomes the modern TÜV. |
| 1880 | American Society of Mechanical Engineers | Technical society | United States | ASME formed, largely in response to calls for improvements in boiler safety |
| 1882 | Boiler Explosions Act 1882 (45 & 46 Vict. c. 22) | Legislation | United Kingdom | Required notice of a boiler explosion to be sent to the Board of Trade within 24 hours of occurrence and established inquiry authorizations. |
| 1884 | ASME Boiler Testing Code | Safety standard | United States | The "Code for the Conduct of Trials of Steam Boilers", the first U.S. code for conducting boiler tests, is issued. |
| 1887 | Robert Henry Thurston's book Steam Boiler Explosions in Theory, and in Practice | Book | United States | |
| 1890 | Boiler Explosions Act 1890 | Legislation | United Kingdom | Extended 1882 requirements to marine vessels. |
| 1911 | Uniform Boiler Rules, Massachusetts | Legislation | United States | The Commonwealth of Massachusetts adopts uniform boiler rules, the first statewide boiler code to apply in the U.S. Equivalent rules are quickly adopted by other states (e.g., Ohio). |
| 1915 | ASME Boiler Code | Safety standard | United States | The ASME Boiler Code Committee issues "Standards for Specifications and Construction of Boilers and Other Containing Vessels in Which High Pressure is Contained". |
| 1919 | The National Board of Boiler and Pressure Vessel Inspectors | Safety standard | United States | Formed to "promote greater safety to life and property through uniformity in the construction, installation, repair, maintenance, and inspection of pressure equipment". |

== See also ==
- Fusible plug
- John Hick
- Lists of rail accidents

== Bibliography ==
- Hewison, Christian H. (1983). Locomotive Boiler Explosions. David and Charles. ISBN 0-7153-8305-1.
- Rolt, L. T. C. (2009) [1956]. Red for Danger. Bodley Head / David and Charles / Pan Books. ISBN 9780752451060.
- McEwen, Alan (2009). Historic Steam Boiler Explosions. Sledgehammer Engineering Press. ISBN 978-0-9532725-2-5.
