= Mauá Railway =

First railway in Brazil

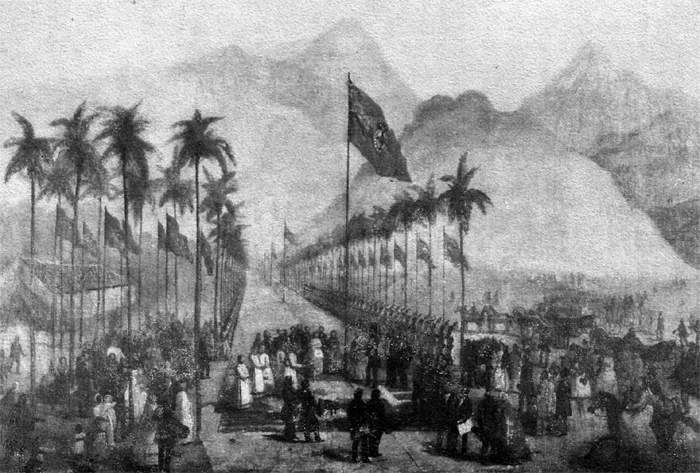

Overview
- Locale: Rio de Janeiro, Brazil
- Dates of operation: 1854–

Technical
- Track gauge: 1,676mm
- Length: 18km

The Mauá Railway (Portuguese: Estrada de Ferro Mauá), officially known as the Imperial Petropolis Steam Navigation and Railway Company (Imperial Companhia de Navegação a Vapor e Estrada de Ferro de Petropolis), was the first railway established in Brazil and the third in South America.

== History ==
The railway was built to connect the Mauá Port, at Guanabara Bay, and the base of the Estrela mountain, located at the region of the city of Petrópolis, state of Rio de Janeiro. The project's main objective was to ease the difficulties of transporting cargo and passengers between the coast of Rio de Janeiro and the state's interior, an important hub for coffee production - one of the main exports of Brazil at the time.

== See also ==
- Irineu Evangelista de Sousa, Viscount of Mauá
