= William Fairbairn =

Scottish civil engineer and shipbuilder (1789–1874)

Sir William Fairbairn Bt FRS
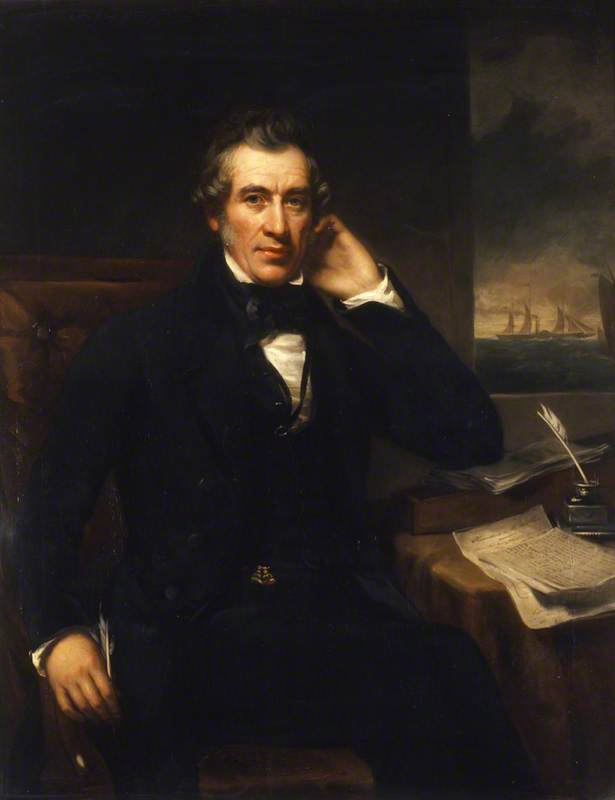
- by Benjamin Rawlinson Faulkner, in the foreground Observations of the Cold blast, referring to On the strength and properties of cast iron obtained from the Hot and Cold blast, presented at the British Association for the Advancement of Science in 1838
- Born: 19 February 1789; Kelso, Scotland
- Died: 18 August 1874 (aged 85); Moor Park, Farnham, England
- Known for: Structural ironwork Shipbuilding; Locomotives; Lancashire Boiler

Sir William Fairbairn, 1st Baronet of Ardwick (19 February 1789 – 18 August 1874) was a Scottish civil engineer, structural engineer and shipbuilder. In 1854 he succeeded George Stephenson and Robert Stephenson to become the third president of the Institution of Mechanical Engineers.

== Early career ==
Born in Kelso to a local farmer, Fairbairn showed an early mechanical aptitude and served as an apprentice millwright in Newcastle upon Tyne where he befriended the young George Stephenson. He moved to Manchester in 1813 to work for Adam Parkinson and Thomas Hewes. In 1817, he launched his mill-machinery business with James Lillie as Fairbairn and Lillie Engine Makers.

== Structural studies ==
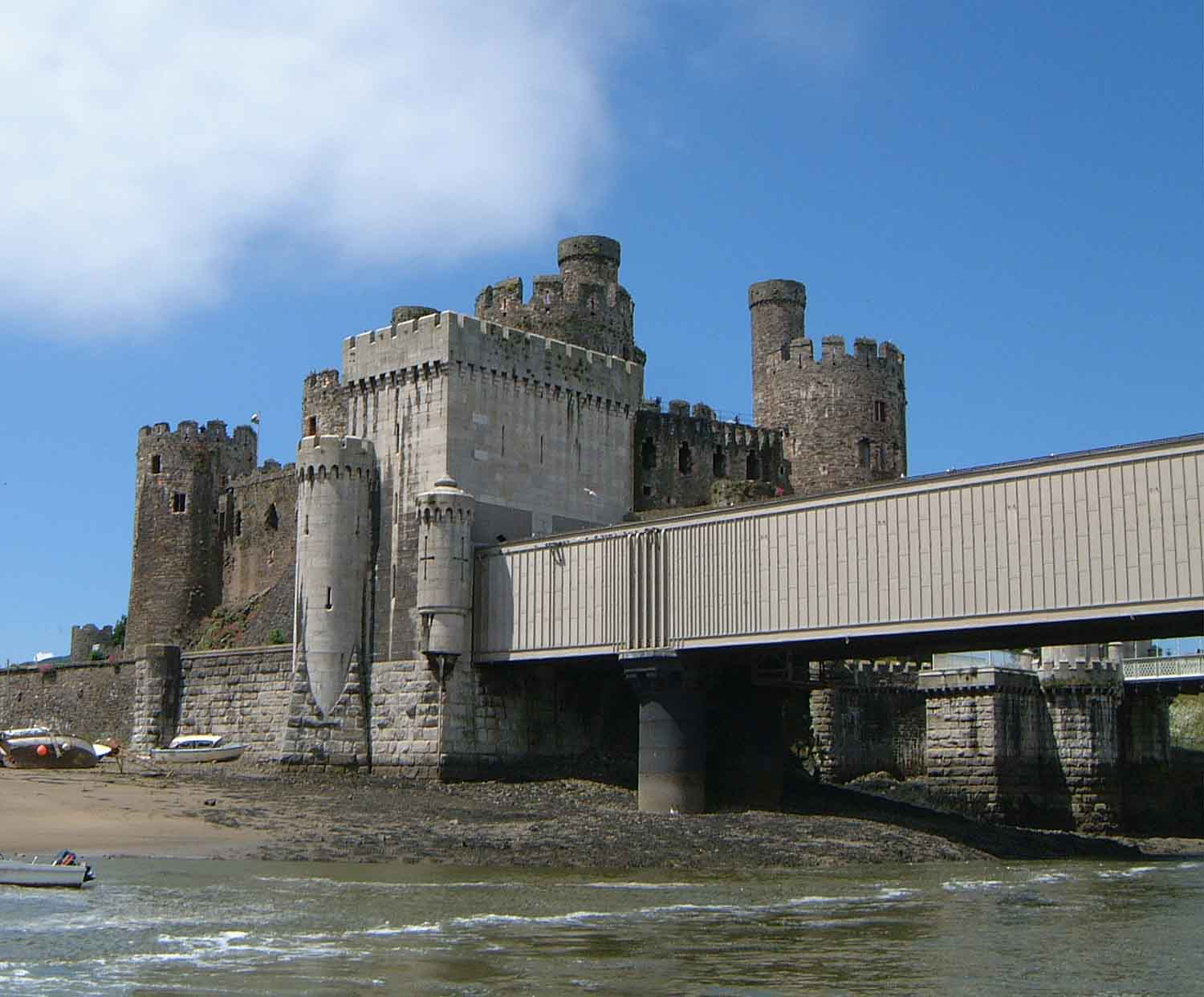
The western end of the Conwy Railway Bridge next to the castle

Fairbairn was a lifelong learner and joined the Institution of Civil Engineers in 1830. In the 1820s and 30s, he and Eaton Hodgkinson conducted a search for an optimal cross section for iron beams. They designed, for example, the bridge over Water Street for the Liverpool and Manchester Railway, which opened in 1830. In the 1840s, when Robert Stephenson, the son of his youthful friend George, was trying to develop a way of crossing the Menai Strait, he retained both Fairbairn and Hodgkinson as consultants. It was Fairbairn who conceived the idea of a rectangular tube or box girder to bridge the large gap between Anglesey and North Wales. He conducted many tests on prototypes in his Millwall shipyard and at the site of the bridge, showing how such a tube should be constructed. The design was first used in a shorter span at Conwy, and followed by the much larger Britannia Bridge. The tube bridge ultimately proved far too costly a concept for widespread use owing to the sheer mass and cost of wrought iron needed. Fairbairn himself developed wrought iron trough bridges which used some of the ideas he had developed in the tubular bridge.

== Shipbuilding ==
When the cotton industry fell into recession, Fairbairn diversified into the manufacture of boilers for locomotives and into shipbuilding. Perceiving a ship as a floating tubular beam, he criticised existing design standards dictated by Lloyd's of London.

Fairbairn and Lillie built the iron paddle-steamer Lord Dundas at Manchester in 1830. The difficulties which were encountered in the construction of iron ships in an inland town like Manchester led to the removal of this branch of the business to Millwall, London in 1834–35. Here Fairbairn constructed over eighty vessels, including Pottinger of 1,250 tons, for P&O; HMS Megaera and other vessels for the British Government, and many others, introducing iron shipbuilding on the River Thames. In 1848 he retired from this branch of his business.

Fairbairn drew on his experience with the construction of iron-hulled ships when designing the Britannia Bridge and Conwy railway bridges.

== Railway locomotives ==
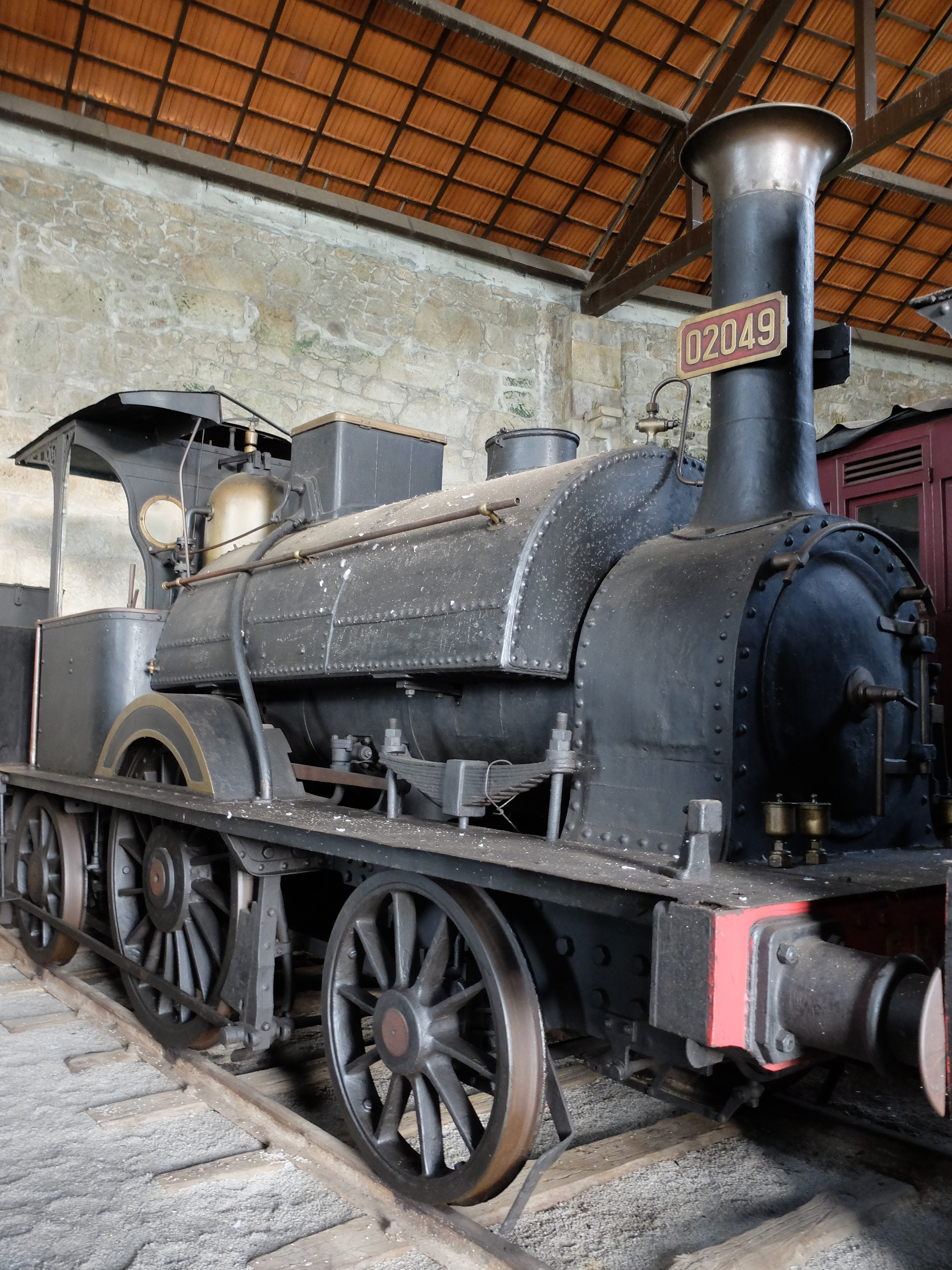
Locomotive CP 02049 (Ex Companhia Central e Peninsular (CCeP) 14)

Fairbairn began building railway locomotives in 1839 with an 0-4-0 design for the Manchester & Bolton Railway. By 1862 the company had constructed more than 400 at Millwall for companies such as the Great Western Railway and the London & North Western Railway. However, as the works had no rail access, any locomotives had to be shipped by road.

== Boilers ==
Fairbairn developed the Lancashire boiler in 1844. In 1861, at the request of the Parliament of the United Kingdom, he conducted early research into metal fatigue, raising and lowering a 3 tonne mass onto a wrought iron cylinder 3,000,000 times before it fractured and showing that a static load of 12 tonne was needed for such an effect.

He experimented with glass cylinders and was able to show that the hoop stress in the wall was twice the longitudinal stress. When a cylindrical boiler failed, it usually fractured along its length owing to the high hoop stress in the wall.

This knowledge of how hoop stress increased with diameter, and how stresses were independent of drum length led to his invention of the Fairbairn-Beeley and his five-tube boilers, where a single large diameter shell was replaced by multiple smaller, and less stressed, shells. Eventually this would lead to the near-universal adoption of water-tube boilers with small tubes for high pressures, replacing the older fire-tube designs.

== Investigations ==
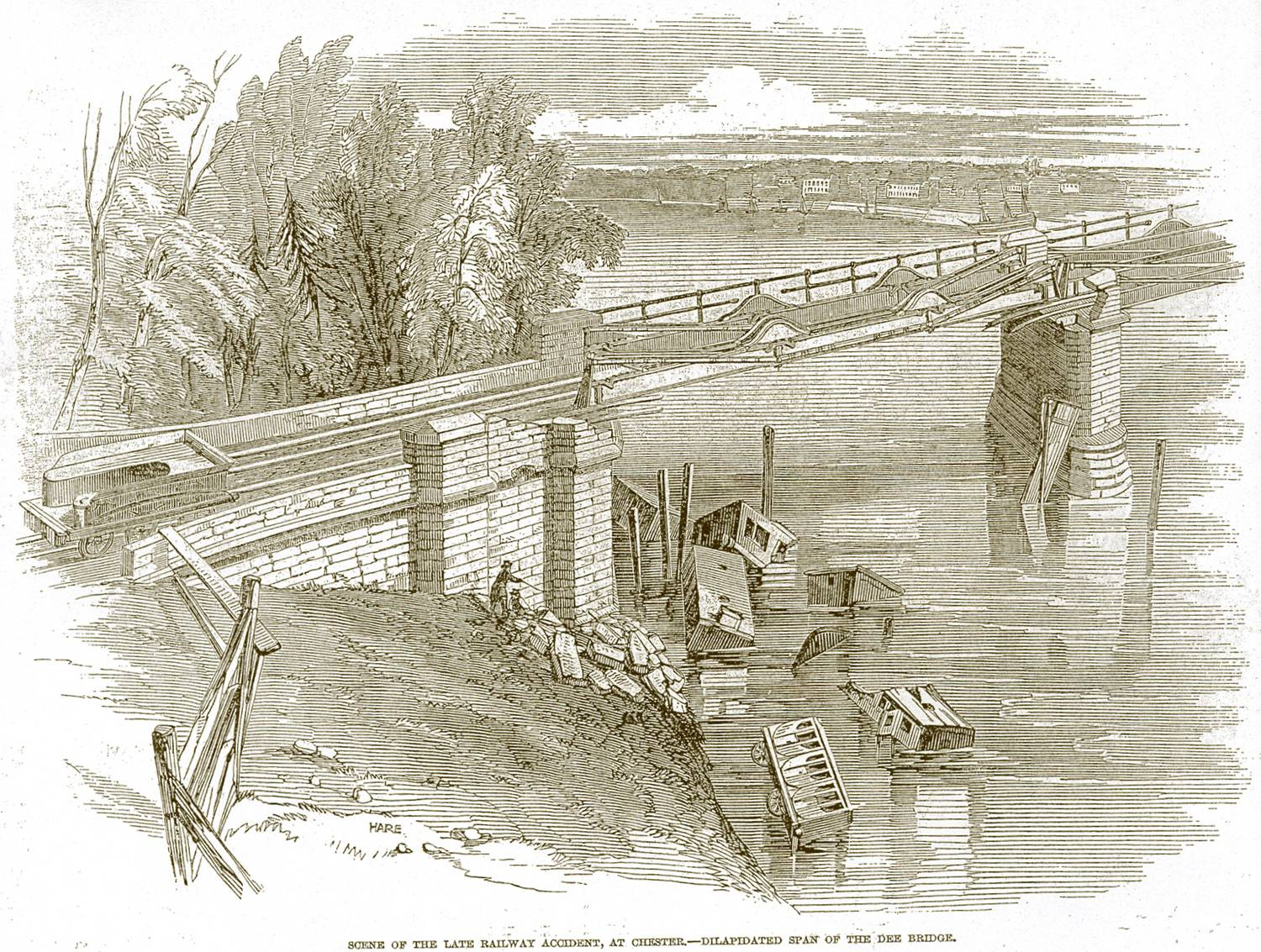
Dee bridge disaster

Fairbairn was one of the first engineers to conduct systematic investigations of failures of structures, including the collapse of textile mills and boiler explosions. His report on the collapse of a mill at Oldham showed the poor design methods used by architects when specifying cast iron girders for supporting heavily loaded floors, for example. In another report, he condemned the use of trussed cast iron girders, and advised Robert Stephenson not to use the concept in a bridge then being built over the River Dee at Chester in 1846. The bridge collapsed in May 1847, killing 5 people who were passengers on the local train passing over the structure at the time. The Dee Bridge disaster raised concerns about the integrity of many other railway bridges already built or about to be built on the rail network.

Fairbairn conducted some of the first serious studies of the effects of repeated loading of wrought and cast iron girders, showing that fracture could occur by crack growth from incipient defects, a problem now known as fatigue. He built large-scale testing apparatus for the studies, and was partly funded by the Board of Trade.

He also conducted experiments on pressurized cylinders of glass and was able to show that the highest stress in the wall occurs around the diameter. It is known as the hoop stress and is twice the value of the longitudinal stress which occurs along the length of the cylinder. The precise value depends only on the wall thickness and the internal pressure. His work was published in the Proceedings of the Royal Society and was of great help in analysing failures in steam boilers and pipes. In 1854 he founded the Manchester Steam Users' Association, which quickly became recognised as setting national standards for high-pressure steam boilers. As the "Associated Offices Technical Committee" of British insurers the MSUA remains a national certification authority.

== Honours ==
- Fellow of the Royal Society elected 1850 (Gold Medal 1860)
- President of the Institution of Mechanical Engineers 1854–1855.
- President of the Manchester Literary and Philosophical Society (1855–1859)
- Elected in February 1860 to the Smeatonian Society of Civil Engineers
- Appointed Baronet, (of Ardwick), 2 November 1869; he had declined a knighthood in 1861
- A statue stands in Manchester Town Hall
- Conferred with Honorary Membership of the Institution of Engineers and Shipbuilders in Scotland in 1859.
- President of the British Association 1861
- Foreign Honorary Member of the American Academy of Arts and Sciences 1862
- Inducted into the Scottish Engineering Hall of Fame in 2017.

Fairbairn is one of several notable engineers to be buried in the churchyard of St Mary's Church, Prestwich. The number of people present at his funeral was estimated at from 50,000 to 70,000.

== Works ==
- Remarks on Canal Navigation. London: Longman, Rees, Orme, Brown & Green. 1831.
- An Account of the Construction of the Britannia and Conway Tubular Bridges. London: John Weale. 1849.
- Fairbairn, William (1851). Two Lectures: The Construction of Boilers, and on Boiler Explosions, with the means of prevention.
- On Tubular Girder Bridges. London: William Clowes & Sons. 1851.
- On the Application of Cast and Wrought Iron to Building Purposes (1st ed.). London: John Weale. 1854.
- Useful Information for Engineers. London: Longmans. 1856.
- Iron, Its History, Properties, and Processes of Manufacture. Edinburgh: Adam and Charles Black. 1861.
- Treatise on Mills and Millwork, Part I. London: Longmans, Green & Company. 1863.
- Treatise on Mills and Millwork, Part II. London: Longmans, Green and Company. 1871.
- Experiments to determine the effect of impact, vibratory action, and long continued changes of load on wrought iron girders, (1864) Philosophical Transactions of the Royal Society of London vol. 154, p311
- Treatise on Iron Ship Building: Its History and Progress (1st ed.). London: Longmans, Green and Co. 1865.
- The Principles of Mechanism and Machinery of Transmission. Philadelphia: Henry Carey Baird. 1871.

== See also ==
- Bombay Spinning and Weaving Company
- McConnel & Kennedy Mills

Baronetage of the United Kingdom
| New creation | Baronet (of Ardwick); 1869–1874 | Succeeded by Thomas Fairbairn |
Professional and academic associations
| Preceded by Robert Stephenson | President of the Institution of Mechanical Engineers; 1854–1855 | Succeeded by Joseph Whitworth |
| Preceded by John Moore | President of the Manchester Literary and Philosophical Society; 1855–59 | Succeeded by James Prescott Joule |
