= William Fairbairn & Sons =

Defunct English engineering works

- Industry: Engineering
- Predecessor: Fairbairn and Lillie Engine Makers
- Founded: 1816
- Founder: William Fairbairn
- Defunct: 1864 (Locomotive business sold)
- Successor: Sharp, Stewart and Company
- Headquarters: Manchester
- Products: Steam engines Steam ships Locomotives; Steam cranes

William Fairbairn and Sons was an engineering works in Manchester, England.

== History ==
William Fairbairn opened an iron foundry in 1816 and was joined the following year by a Mr. Lillie, and the firm became known as Fairbairn and Lillie Engine Makers, producing iron steamboats.

Their foundry and millwrighting factory burned down on 6 August 1831 with damage estimated at £8,000. The business survived this event.

=== Shipbuilding ===
In 1830, they built the iron paddle-steamer Lord Dundas, for use on the Forth and Clyde Canal. She proved so successful that the firm built eight more of a larger size within the next two or three years for Scottish canals, two passenger-boats with 40 horsepower engines for the Humber and two for the lakes of Zurich and Walenstadt in Switzerland, which, after being tried, were sent out dismantled.

In 1831, they built the Manchester, in 1832, La Reine des Beiges, with engines of 24 horsepower, which went from Liverpool to Ostend. In 1834, they built the Minerva, with 40 horsepower. Minerva was sent in pieces to Hull where she was assembled. She then made the voyage to Rotterdam in 33 hours, and steamed up to the Rhine Falls, where she was again dismantled and carried overland to Lake Zurich.

The difficulties which were found to exist in an inland town like Manchester for the construction of iron vessels led to this branch of the business moving to London in the years 1834–5. There at Millwall on the Isle of dogs, William Fairbairn constructed more than eighty vessels of various sizes, including the Pottinger, of 1250 tons and 450 horsepower, for the Peninsular and Oriental Steam Navigation Company, the Megaera and other vessels for the Royal Navy, and many others. Thus introducing iron shipbuilding on the River Thames. Until in 1848 when Fairbairn retired from this branch of his business.

=== Railway locomotives ===
When Mr. Lillie left the firm in 1839, the name changed to William Fairbairn & Sons and the company's attention turned to railway locomotives.

Their first designs were of the four-wheeled "Bury" type, built for the Manchester and Leeds Railway. Generally they built to the design of the customer or similar to those being produced by Edward Bury and Company and Sharp, Roberts and Company.

In all they produced over sixty-nine locomotives for the M&LR, their main customer, but they also built for the "little" North Western Railway and for lines in Ireland. In 1841–42, they "renewed" 11 locomotives for the London and South Western Railway. The locomotives had originally been built in 1838-39 under the company's first locomotive engineer Joseph Woods but had proved unsatisfacory in service and John Viret Gooch, Wood's successor, arranged for their "renewal". The 2-2-2 locomotives then became known as the "Southampton" class and were numbered 16–26 in 1846. Fairbairn's supplied further 2-2-2 locomotives, known as the "Alecto" class for the LSWR in 1846–47. Fairbairn's production was mainly lightweight 0-4-0, then 2-2-2, 2-4-0 and 0-4-2 engines typical of the day. One example of a Fairbairn locomotive, a small 2-2-2 tank engine, is preserved, in Rio de Janeiro.

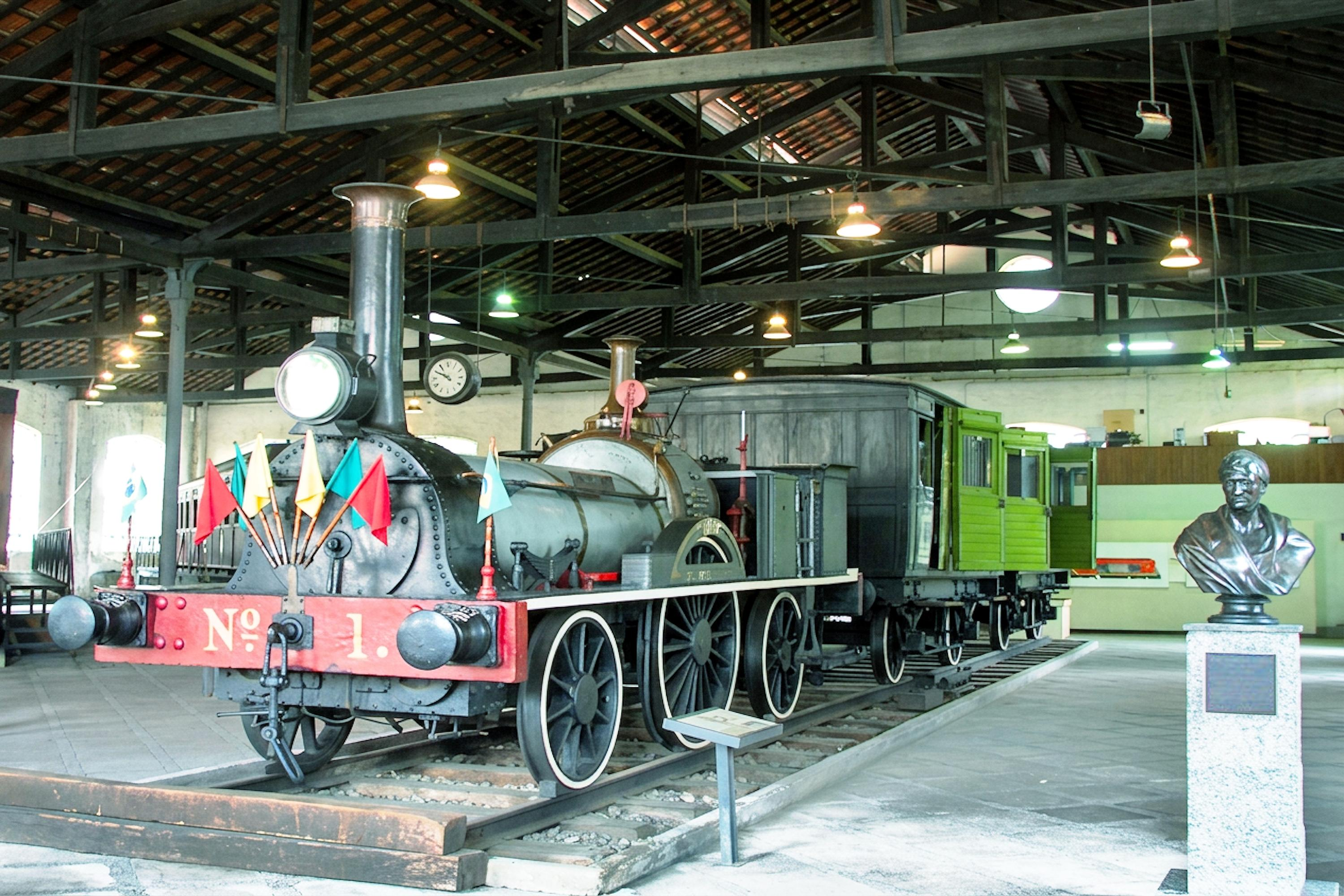
1852 William Fairbairn & Sons Jenny Lind 2-2-2 N°1 Baroneza Ex Estrada De Ferro Mauá Ex E.F.Petropólis

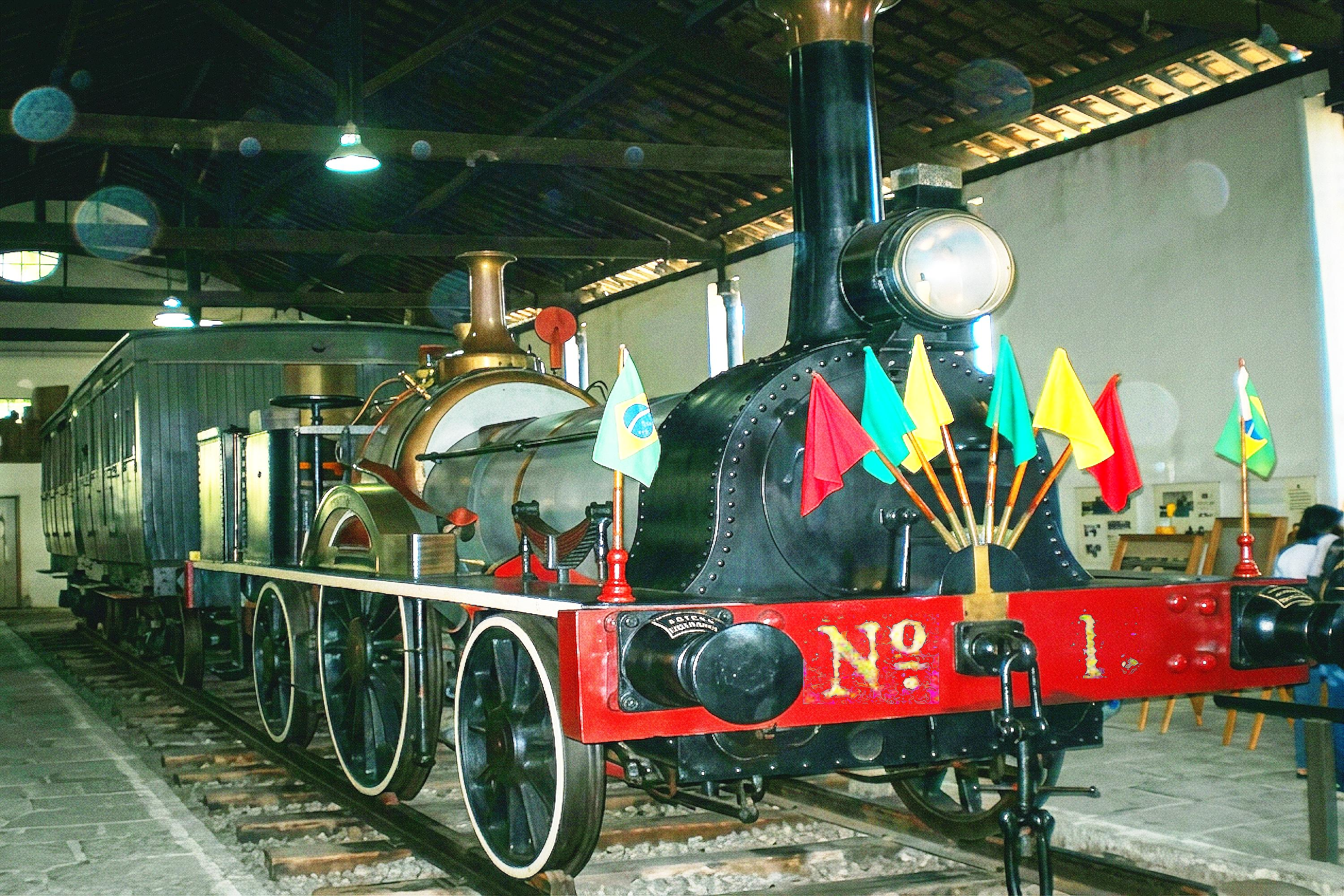
1852 William Fairbairn & Sons Jenny Lind 2-2-2 N°1 Baroneza Ex Estrada De Ferro Mauá Ex E.F.Petropólis

In 1852, Fairbain delivered four locomotives to Mauá Railway, Brazil's first railway company, the four of them said to be 2-2-2T. The locomotive first used during the railway line construction works was one called Manchester, but the one to pull Mauá Railway's - and therefore Brazil's - inauguration train 30 April 1854 was the one called Baroneza (modern spelling is "Baronesa"). It is not known if the three others still were in use in 1883, the year "Baroneza" was surrendered to Estrada de Ferro Dom Pedro II where she was re-gauged from 5 ft 6 in (1,676 mm) - some literature says it was 5 ft 6 1/8 in (1,680 mm)- to 5 ft 3 in (1,600 mm) and numbered N°1, because is the first rail vehicle imported to Brazil. The "Baroneza" measures 7.5 m in length, 2.5 m in width, and 3.40 m in height, and weighs approximately 17 tonnes. It features two leading wheels (1.29 m of diameter) and one driving wheel (1.50 m in diameter), with cylinders measuring 0.279 m in diameter and a 381 mm stroke. It is equipped with two chimneys, a headlight, and two running boards. In 1890, due to the proclamation of the Republic, Estrada de Ferro Dom Pedro II was renamed into Estrada de Ferro Central do Brasil and Baroneza continued #1 until her withdrawal before World War I. She was preserved by Estrada de Ferro Central do Brasil and after 1957 by RFFSA – Rede Ferroviária Federal S.A.'s railway preservation agency PRESERFE. Today under the responsibility of IPHAN – Instituto do Patrimônio Histórico e Artístico Nacional, as mentioned above she's exhibited at former RFFSA – Rede Ferroviária Federal S.A.'s Engenho de Dentro railway museum in Rio de Janeiro, RJ. This could have been transferred to Museu do Império in Petrópolis.

However, in 1851-5 they built 40 larger engines to the design of James McConnell for the Southern Division of the London and North Western Railway. In 1862, they built some 2-2-2 locomotives to the design of the Great Eastern Railway.

The Midland Railway and the West Midland Railway bought a number of 0-6-0 and in 1861, the Furness Railway bought two 0-4-0s. The locomotive building part of the business was sold to Sharp, Stewart and Company in 1863.

== Work ==
William Fairbairn was an innovative engineer and his company was involved in many developments across the whole field of engineering. When the Albert Hall was built as a memorial to Prince Albert the company was involved in the design. Although the hall itself was built of brick and terracotta the dome (designed by Rowland Mason Ordish) on top was made of wrought iron and glazed. There was a trial assembly made of the iron framework of the dome at William Fairbairn's Manchester works, then it was taken apart again and transported to London via horse and cart. When the time came for the supporting structure to be removed from the dome after reassembly in situ, only volunteers remained on site in case the structure dropped. It did drop – but only by five-sixteenths of an inch.

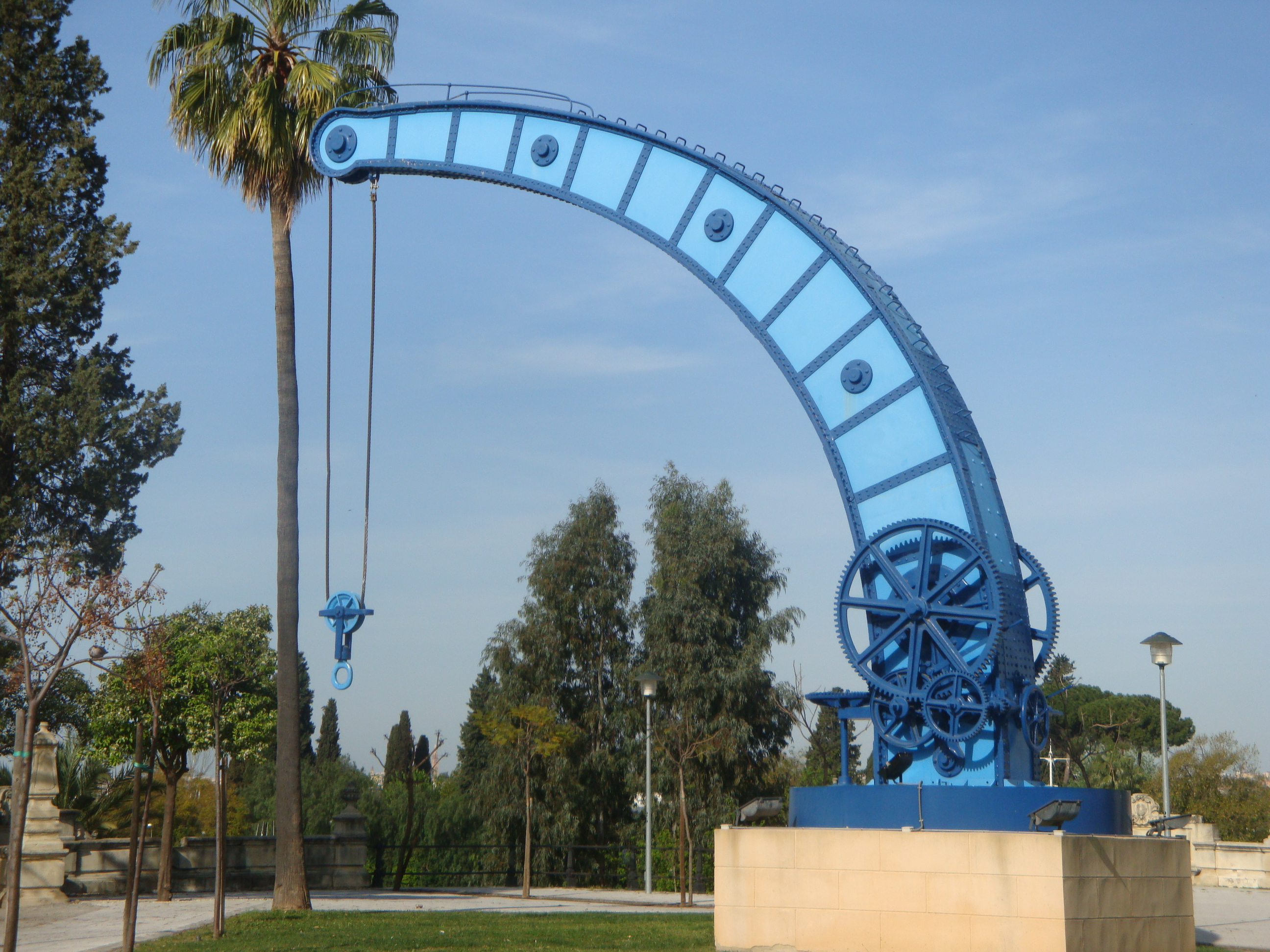
Fairbairn crane in Seville port

- An Account of the Construction of the Britannia and Conway Tubular Bridges, (1849)
- Experiments to determine the effect of impact, vibratory action, and long continued changes of load on wrought iron girders, (1864) Philosophical Transactions of the Royal Society of London vol. 154, S. 311
- Treatise on Iron Shipbuilding, (1865)

== See also ==
- McConnel & Kennedy Mills
- Kay & Routledge
