= Enefit Green =

Company based in Estonia

Enefit Green AS
- Type: Private
- ISIN: ISIN: EE3100137985
- Industry: Renewable energy
- Founded: 2016
- Headquarters: Tallinn, Estonia
- Key people: Juhan Aguraiuja (CEO); Andrus Durejko (Chairman)
- Products: Electric power Heat
- Services: District heating
- Parent: Eesti Energia
- Website: www.enefitgreen.ee

Enefit Green AS is a renewable energy company located in Tallinn, Estonia. It went public with 23% of share capital on Nasdaq Tallinn in October 2021 and was subsequently renationalised in May-July 2025 with complete control returning to the Estonian state-owned energy company Eesti Energia.

Enefit Green was established in 2016 based on the renewable energy assets of Eesti Energia. The name of Enefit Green was adopted at the end of 2017. In 2018, Enefit Green installed at the remote off-the-grid Ruhnu island an hybrid power generation system, which includes a solar farm, a wind turbine, and battery for energy storage, backed-up with a diesel generator running on biodiesel. Also in 2018, Enefit Green acquired renewable energy producer Nelja Energia which became a subsidiary of Enefit Green.

Enefit Green owns four wind farms (Paldiski, Narva, Aulepa, Virtsu), Iru waste-to-energy plant, Paide and Valka biomass power plants, Keila-Joa hydroelectric power plant, and Ruhnu hybrid power generation. In addition, its subsidiary Nelja Energia owns eleven wind farms in Estonia and four wind farms in Lithuania, two biogas-fuelled co-generation plants in Estonia, a co-generation plant and pellet factory in Latvia, and it plans a 700–1,100 MW offshore wind farm off Hiiumaa, Estonia. In 2018, Enefit Green concluded an agreement with Finnish Metsähallitus, that grants the right to Enefit Green to develop a 100 MW wind farm in Tolpanvaara, North Ostrobothnia in Finland. Enefit Green also plans several solar plants with a total capacity of 7 MW.

Enefit Green shares were listed on the main list of the Tallinn Stock Exchange from 21 October 2021 until summer 2025. It traded on the Nasdaq Baltic Stock Exchange as EGR1T. Enefit Green had 264,276,232 shares listed and had 58,771 shareholders with 15% of the shares owned by retail investors.

== See also ==
- Energy in Estonia
