= Nelja Energia =

Company based in Estonia

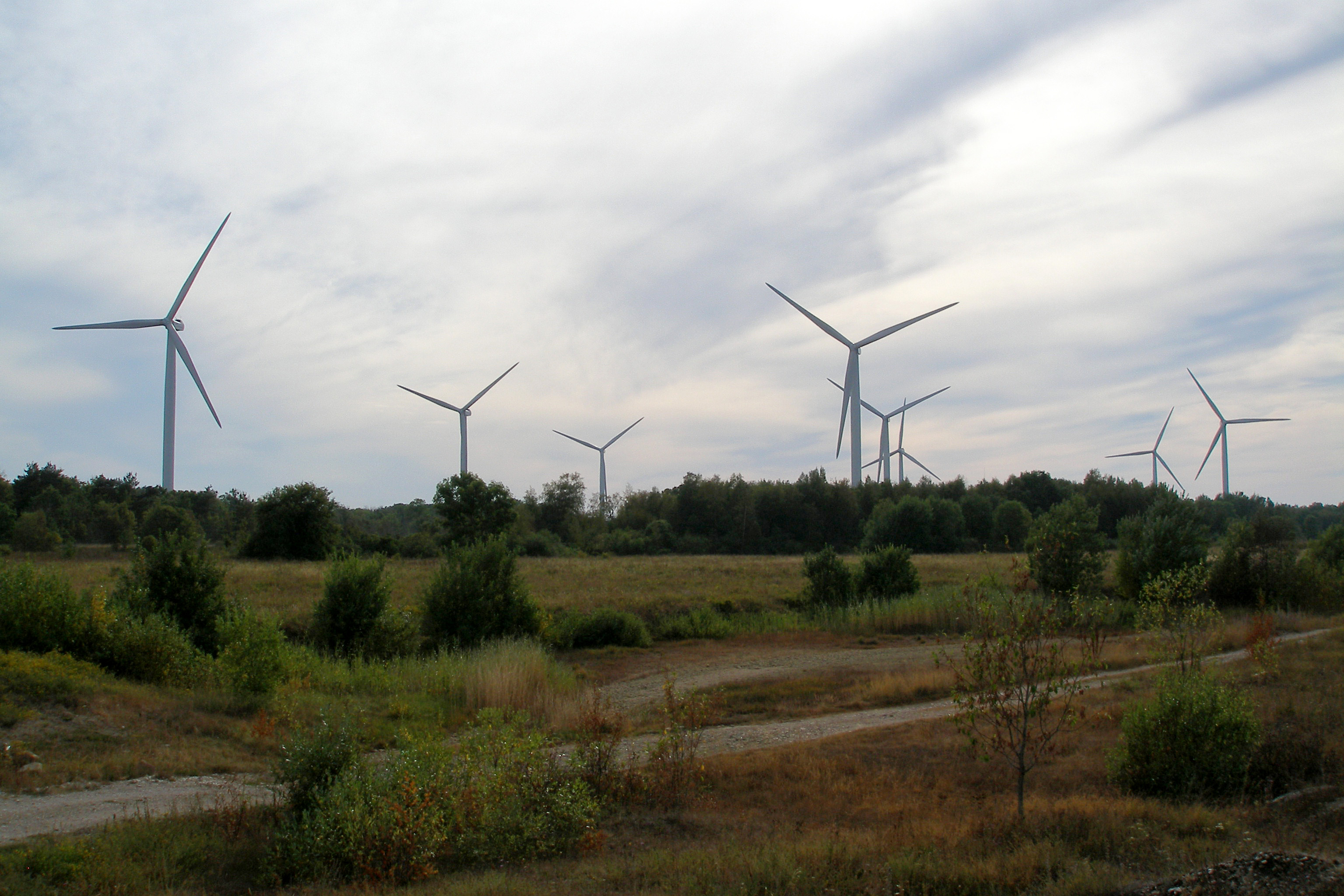
- Nelja Energia-owned Pakri wind farm near Paldiski.
- Company type: Private
- Industry: Renewable energy
- Founded: 2005
- Headquarters: Tallinn, Estonia
- Key people: Aavo Kärmas (CEO); Hando Sutter (Chairman)
- Products: Electric power Biogas; Pellet fuel
- Revenue: €46.4 million (2016)
- Operating income: €8.9 million (2016)
- Parent: Enefit Green
- Website: www.4energia.ee

Nelja Energia AS (also branded as 4Energia) is a renewable energy developer based in Tallinn, Estonia. The main areas of business of the company are the development of the renewable energy industry and the operation of power production. The name of the company, meaning Energy of Four, is referring to the four types of renewable energy: wind, water, biomass and solar. The company is focused on the renewable energy development in the Baltic countries. The CEO of the company is Aavo Kärmas.

Nelja Energia owns and operates eleven wind farms in Estonia with the total capacity of 140.8 MW, and four wind farms in Lithuania with the total capacity of 78.9 MW. In addition, the company operates two biogas-fuelled co-generation plants in Estonia. In Latvia, it owns and operates a cogeneration plant and pellet factory in Brocēni. The company plans a 700–1,100 MW offshore wind farm off Hiiumaa, Estonia.

The company operates since 2005. It started as an operator company for the wind farms owned by Vardar Eurus, a company owned by Norwegian Vardar AS (90%) and the Nordic Environment Finance Corporation (10%), and Freenergy, a company owned by Estonian investors and the European Bank of Reconstruction and Development, and it was owned equally by both companies. In 2012, Freenergy merged with Nelja Energia and the current ownership structure was adopted. The main shareholder of Nelja Energia was Vardar Eurus (77%). Estonian private investors owned 23% of the shares.

On 29 May 2018, it was announced that Enefit Green, a subsidiary of Eesti Energia, will acquire 100% of Nelja Energia shares for €289 million. In addition, it will take over €204 million of Nelja Energia loans. The deal was approved and completed in November 2018.

== See also ==
- Energy in Estonia
