= Iru Power Plant =

Power station in Estonia

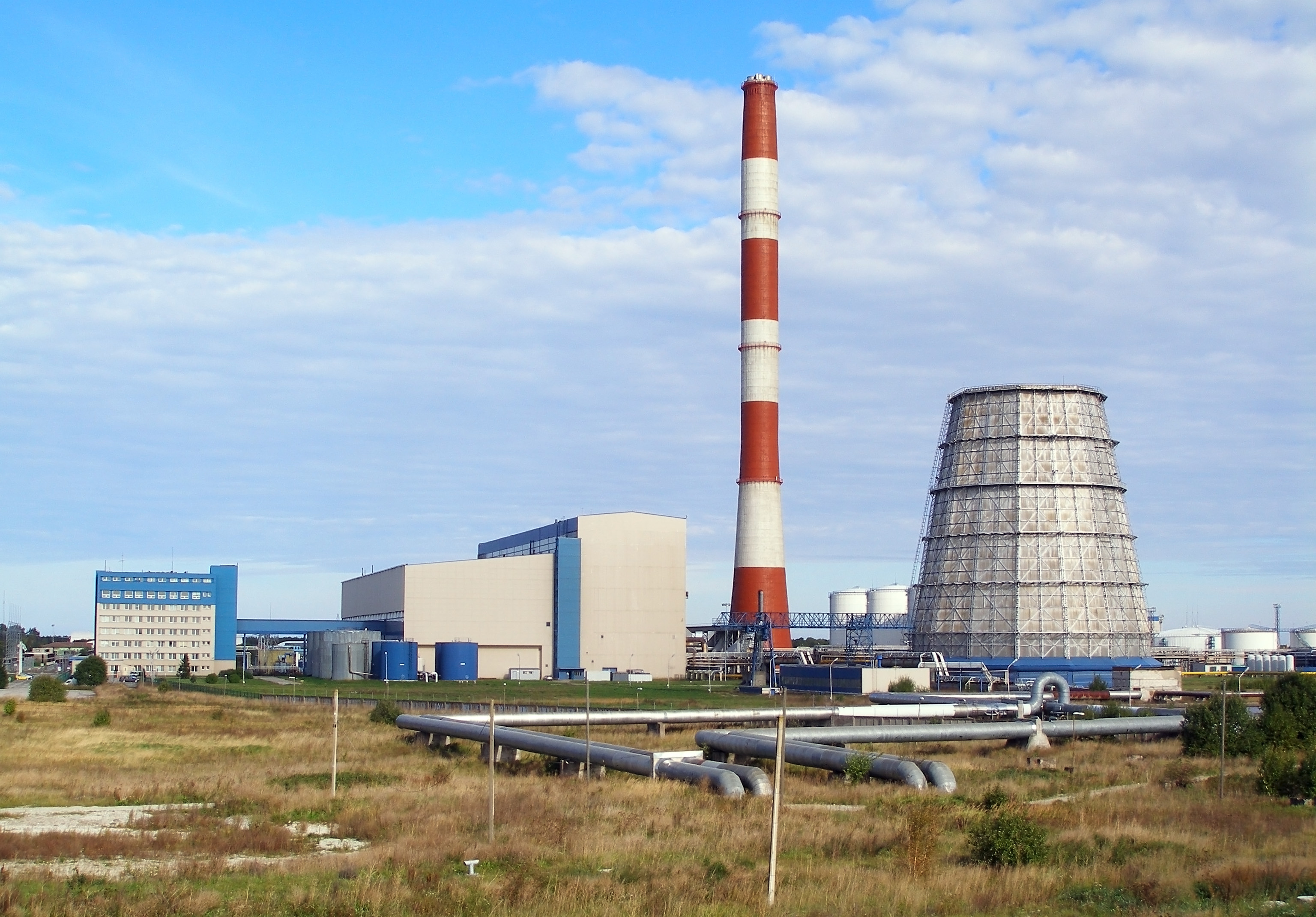
- Iru Power Plant
- Official name: Iru Elektrijaam
- Country: Estonia
- Location: Iru, Maardu
- Coordinates: 59°27′10″N 24°55′39″E
- Status: Operational
- Construction began: 1976 (unit 1); 2010 (unit 3)
- Commission date: 1978 (unit 1); 2013 (unit 3)
- Construction cost: €105 million (unit 3)
- Owner: Enefit Green
- Operator: Enefit Green

Thermal power station
- Primary fuel: Natural gas (units 1 and 2); Municipal solid waste (unit 3)
- Secondary fuel: Fuel oil (units 1 and 2)
- Cogeneration?: Yes

Power generation
- Units operational: 1 × 80 MW; 1 × 110 MW; 1 × 17 MW
- Make and model: LMZ (units 1 and 2); TMZ (units 1 and 2); Sibtjazmaz (units 1 and 2); CNIM (unit 3)
- Nameplate capacity: 207 MW

External links
- Commons: Related media on Commons

Iru Power Plant is a co-generation power plant in Iru village, Maardu, Estonia. It is owned by Enefit Green, a subsidiary of Eesti Energia. The plant has a heating capacity of 698 MWt.

== History ==
The first unit of power plant was commissioned in 1978. In the beginning it operated as a boiler plant. In 1980, it was converted into co-generation power plant.

== Old units ==
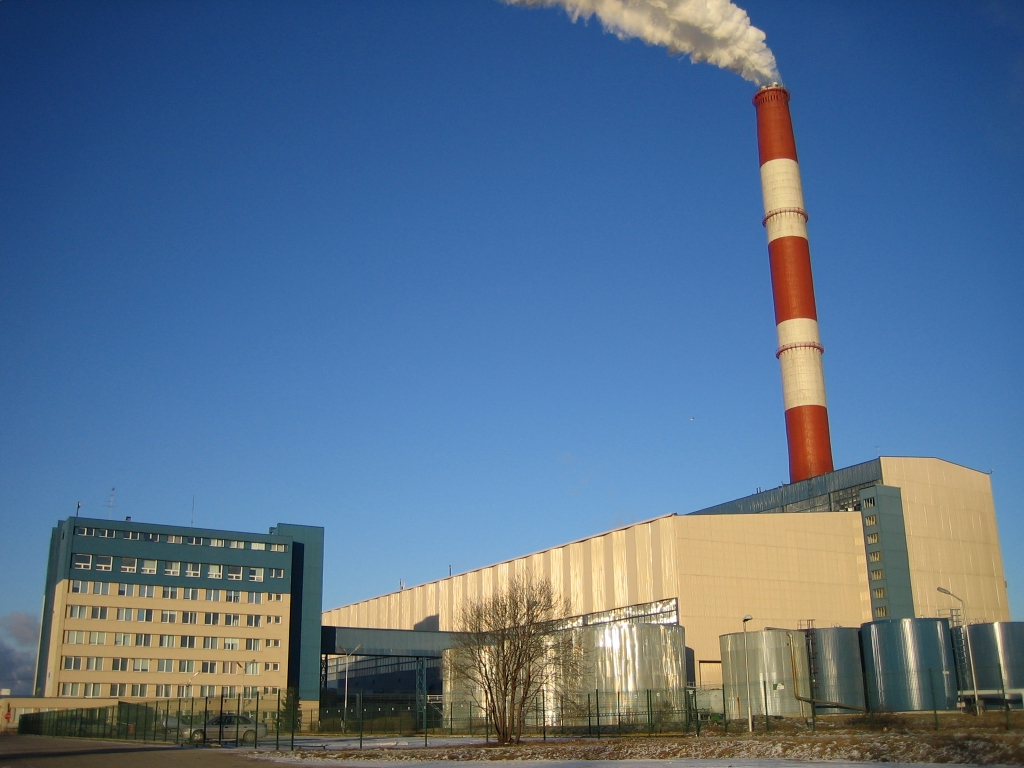
Iru Power Plant (close view)

The power plant has three power units with capacities of 80 MWe, 110 MWe and 17 MWe. The primary fuel of the units 1 and 2 is natural gas and reserve fuel is fuel oil, unit 3 mixed municipal waste. Total installed capacity is 207 MW of electricity, 661.5 MWth of hot water and 162 of MWth steam. In co-generation mode the heating capacity is 398 MWt. It supplies heat to Maardu, and the Lasnamäe and central districts of Tallinn.

== Waste-to-energy unit ==
In 2006, Eesti Energia started preparations for construction of a waste incineration unit with capacity of 50 MW of heat and 17 MW of electricity. Construction started in 2010. It was commissioned on 16 June 2013. The unit processes up to 220,000 tonnes of mixed municipal waste per year. The unit was built and technology was provided by Constructions industrielles de la Méditerranée (CNIM). The general construction was carried out by Merko Ehitus, with the incineration grate supplied by Martin GmbH and the system for the treatment of waste gas by LAB, a subsidiary of CNIM. The unit cost about €105 million.

== Trivia ==
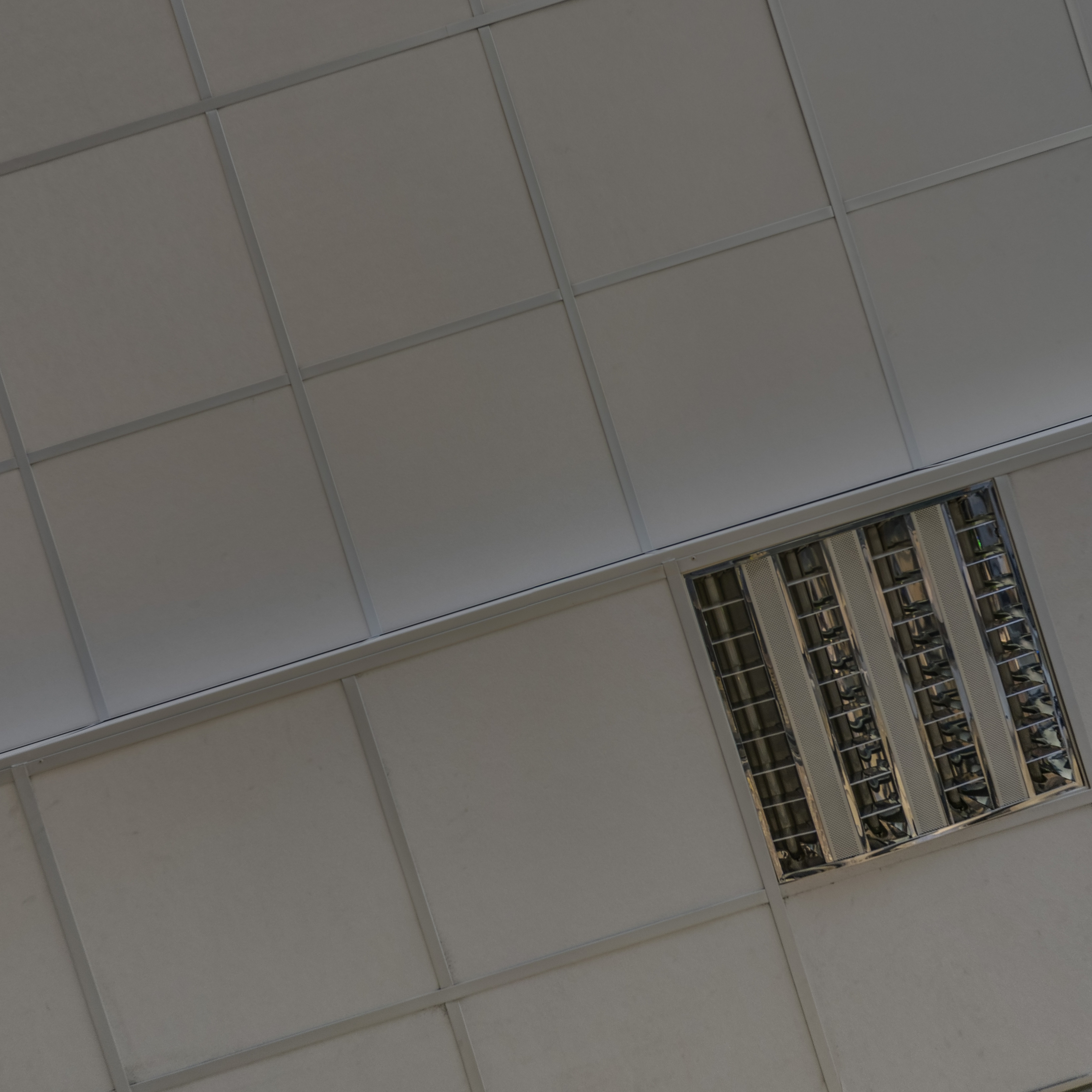
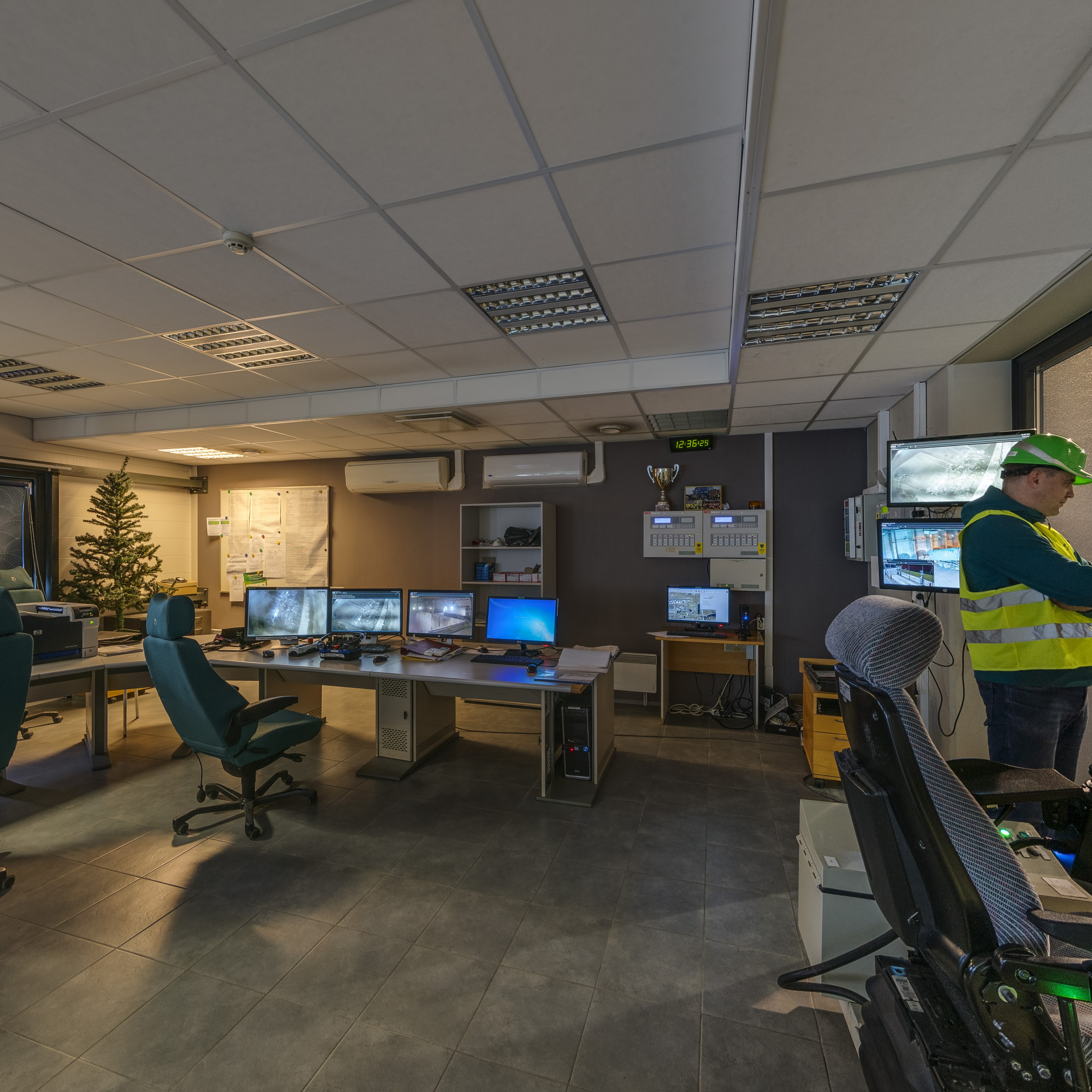
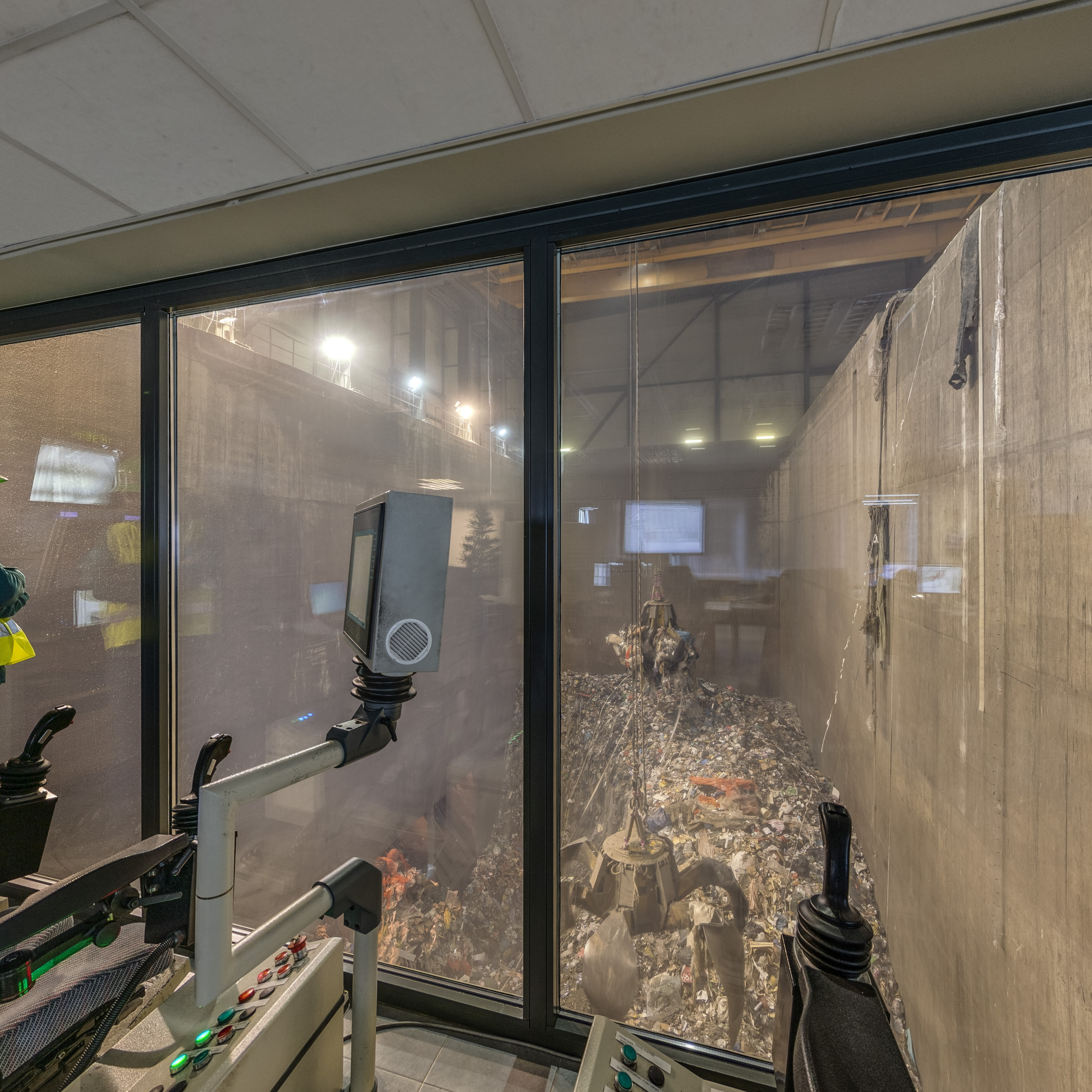
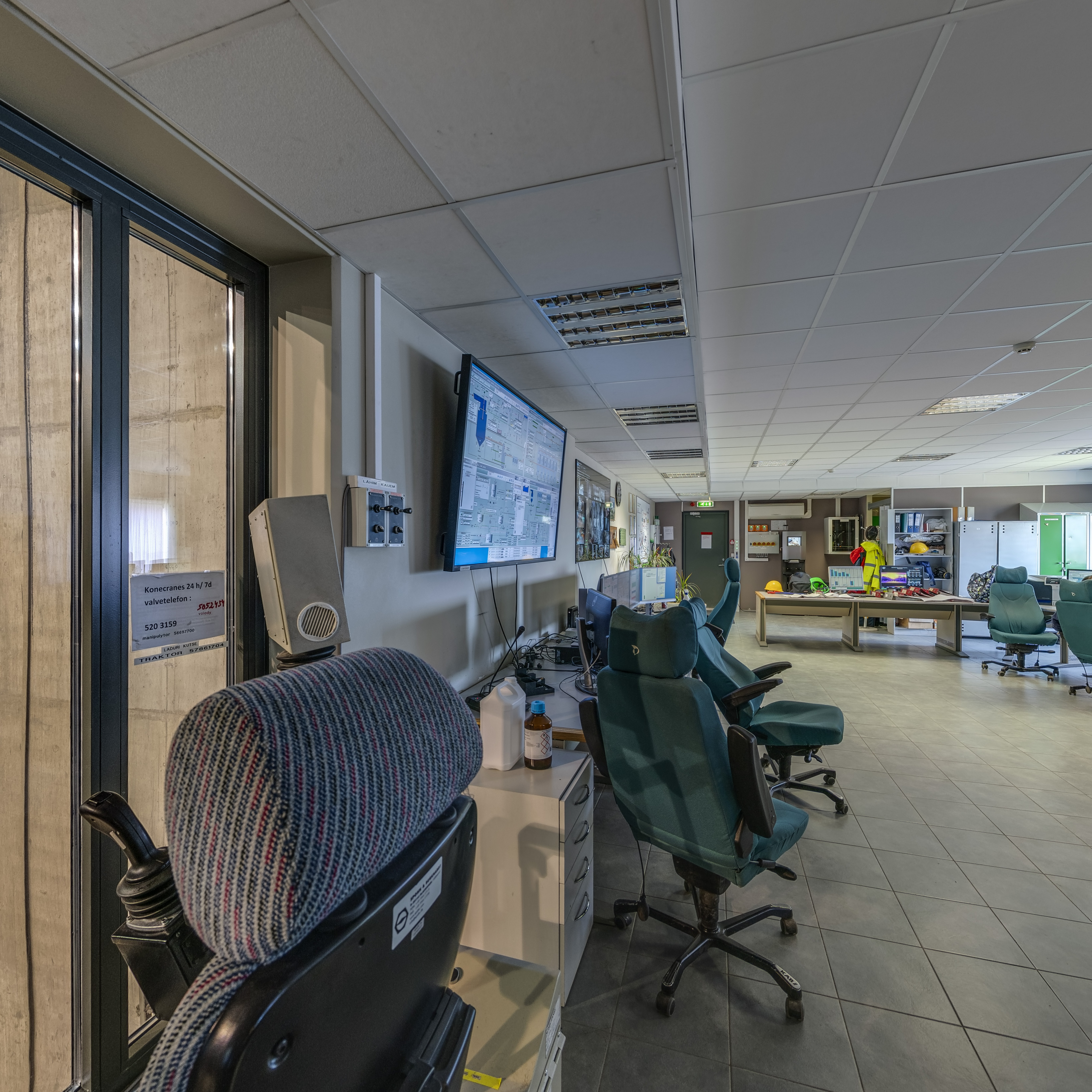
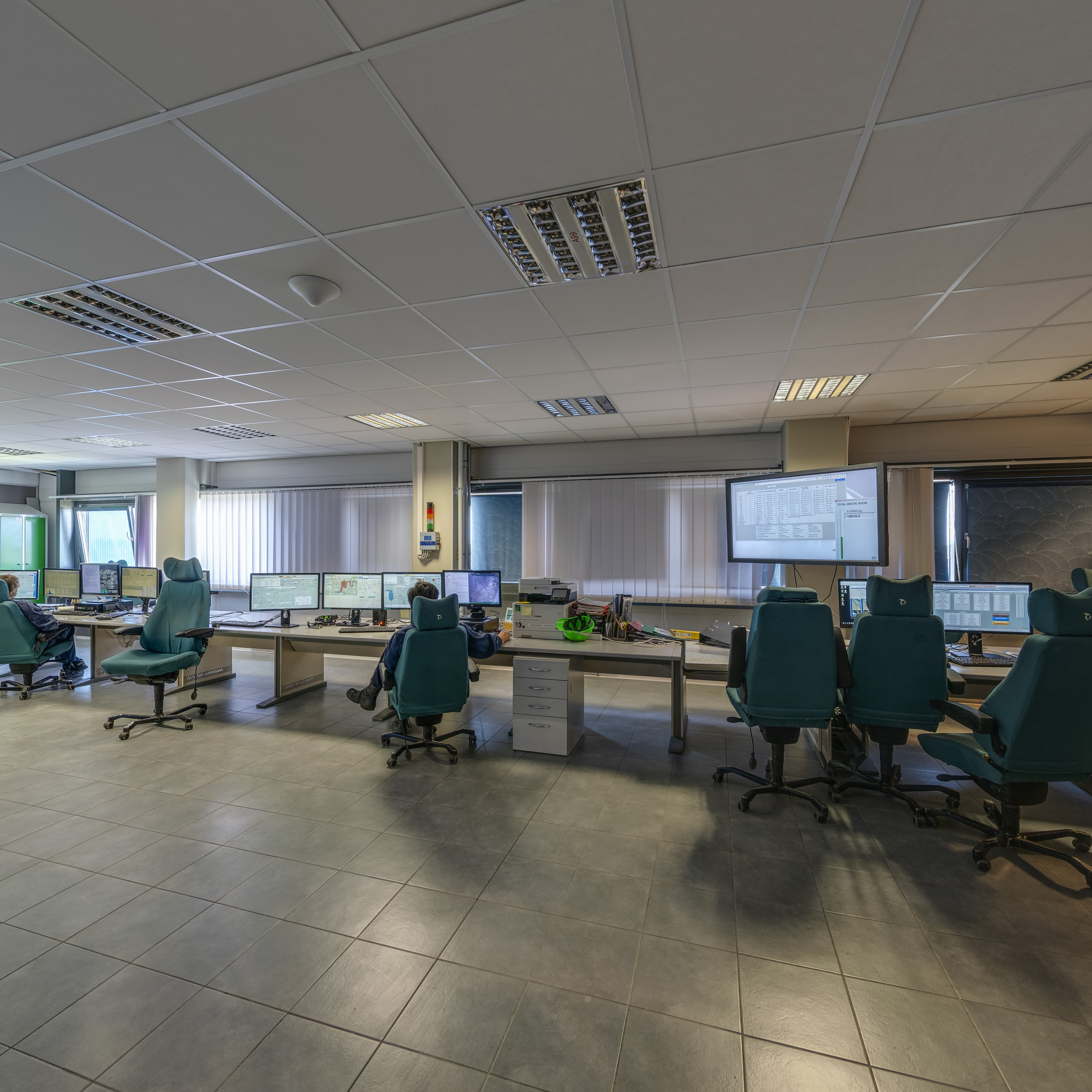
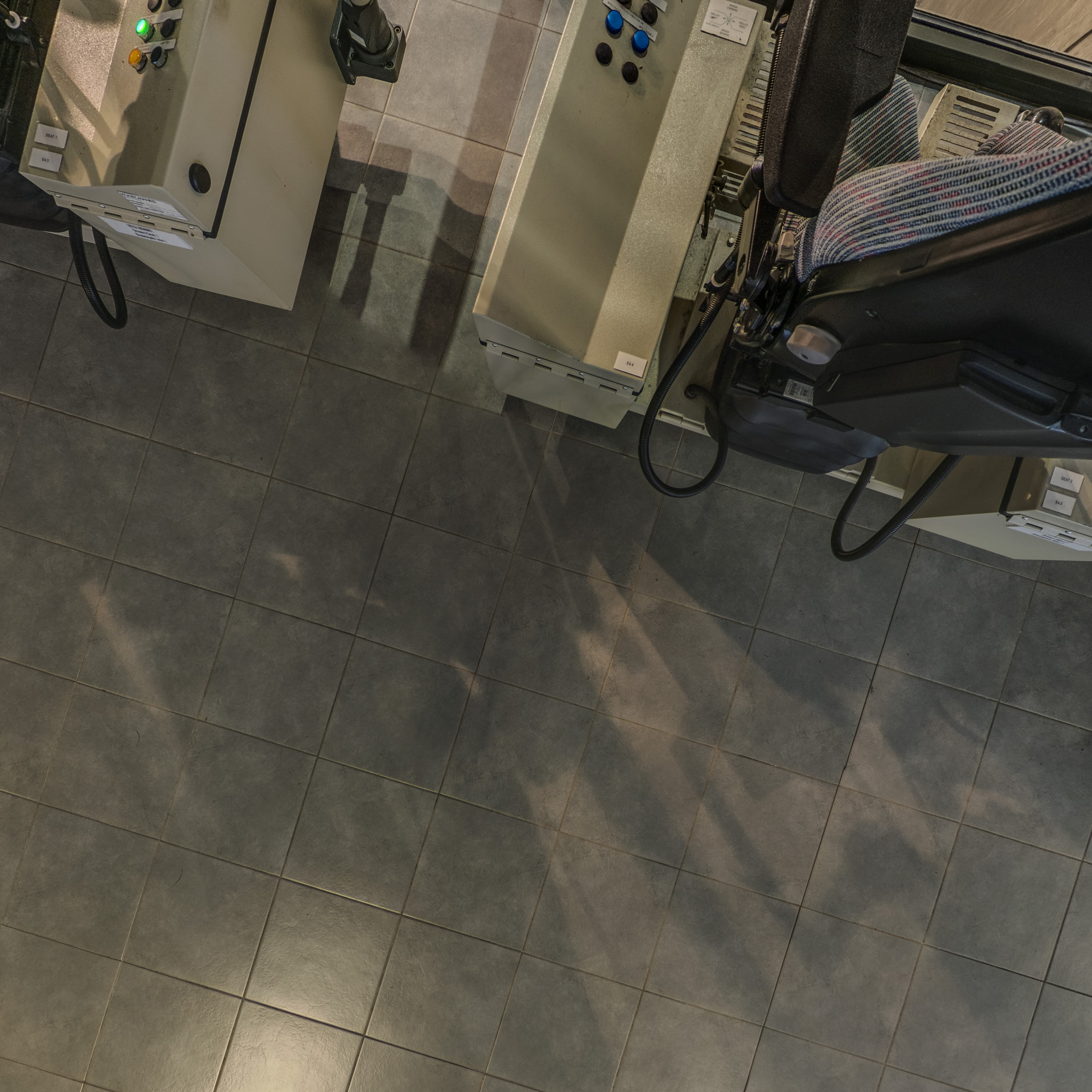
Control center at Iru Power Plant

The director of Iru Power Plant from 2002 to 2004, Kersti Kaljulaid, the first woman to lead a power plant in Estonia, became the fifth President of Estonia in 2016, and the first woman to be President since the country declared independence in 1918.

The Power Plant was used as a filming location for the 1979 film Stalker (1979 film), shown in the background as the Stalker returns home with his wife and daughter.

== See also ==
- Energy in Estonia
