= Deaerating feed tank =

A deaerating feed tank (DFT), often found in steam plants that propel ships, is located after the main condensate pump and before the main feed booster pump.

== Purpose ==
It has these three purposes:

1. Remove dissolved oxygen (“air”) from the condensate
2. Pre-heat the feedwater
3. Provide a storage/surge volume

Based on the relevant theoretical Rankine cycle diagram, there are four main processes, or stages:

- Stages 1→2: Water pressure is raised from low to high by one or more pumps.
- Stages 2→3: Water is heated to boiling in either a conventional boiler or a nuclear propulsion steam generator
- Stages 3→4: Steam is expanded in the steam turbine to turn the ship's propeller and power the ship's turbine generators.
- Stages 4→1: Low pressure wet steam leaving the turbine is condensed in the (condenser. A high vacuum in the condenser improves efficiency.

In the practical implementation of a Rankine cycle, it is common to break the pump process (stages 1→2) into three pumps: (in water flow order: condensate pump, feed booster pump and then feedwater pump).

== Details ==
1. Dissolved oxygen is removed by injecting auxiliary exhaust steam into the upper portion of the tank (above the feed water level) at roughly the same location (elevation) that the condensate enters the tank. The two are put in close physical contact over a large surface area to maximize heat transfer. As the condensate is heated, the steam drives off any dissolved gasses. Since the steam is injected above the feed water level a steam blanket forms above the water to keep the non-condensable gasses from re-entering the feed water. There is a connection to the gland exhaust system on the upper portion of the DFT that withdraws the oxygen and other non-condensable gasses as they are driven from the condensate. Removing oxygen minimizes corrosion and improves the vacuum quality.
2. Liquid water loses its capacity to absorb dissolved air with rising temperatures. The feed tank temperature is maintained just below boiling.
3. The steam heats the water in the tank
4. The water in the tank serves as a surge volume within the steam plant.

The deaerating feed tank's surge volume allows the ship to change "bells" (steam turbine power output) and change the ship's speed without running the feed pump dry or flooding the turbines with liquid water.

When the officer in charge on ship's bridge orders an increased bell, the steam turbine power output is demanded, using more steam and requiring an increased feed rate. This draws more water from the condenser, potentially to the point of going dry and starving the boiler or steam generator resulting in a loss of propulsion. This is until the water, converted to steam, provides its energy to the turbine and then is condensed in the condenser.

When the bell is decreased, turbine power output is reduced and the feed rate drops. Without the DFT's surge volume, less water is drawn from the condenser, the condensate level rises, potentially covering condenser tubes and reducing the ability of the condenser to maintain vacuum. If the level is allowed to go high enough, vacuum could be lost and/or water could impinge (and damage) the turbine blades as the turbine normally sits directly above the condenser. The feed tank serves as a surge volume to take this excess condensate and avoid losing vacuum.
