= MUW =

MUW may refer to:

- Mississippi University for Women, Columbus, Mississippi
- Medical University of Vienna (German: Medizinische Universität Wien), Vienna, Austria
- Medical University of Warsaw, Warsaw, Poland
- Make-up Water
