= Boiler water =

Water in a boiler intended for evaporation

Boiler water is liquid water within a boiler, or in associated piping, pumps and other equipment, that is intended for evaporation into steam. The term may also be applied to raw water intended for use in boilers, treated boiler feedwater, steam condensate being returned to a boiler, or boiler blowdown being removed from a boiler.

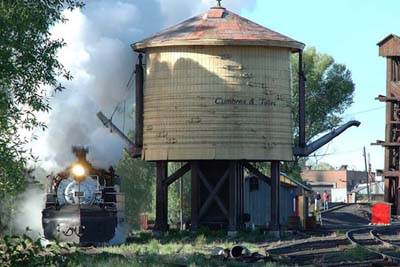
Storage tank of water for locomotive boilers

== Early practice ==
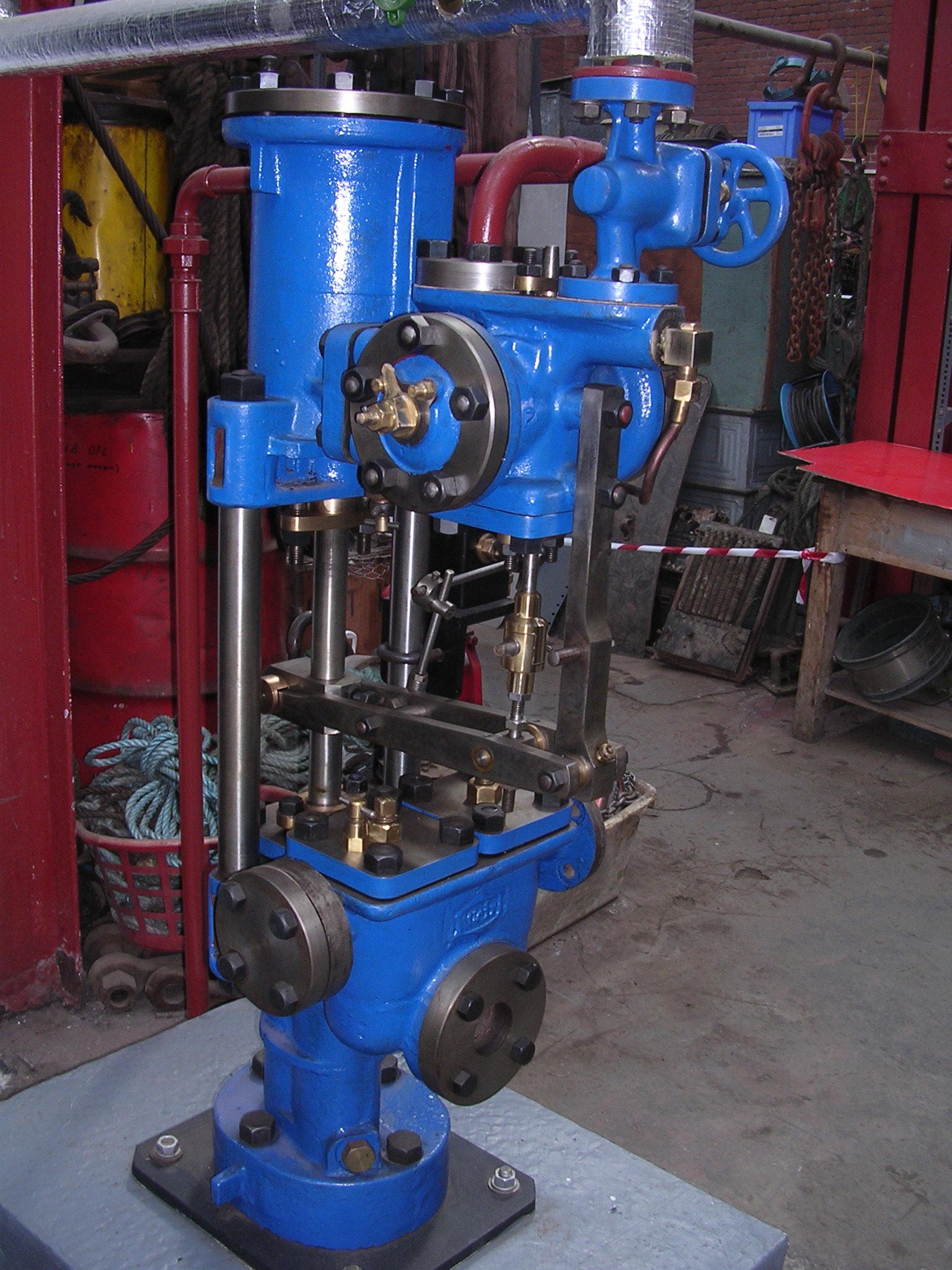
Boiler feed water pump

Impurities in water will leave solid deposits as steam evaporates. These solid deposits thermally insulate heat exchange surfaces initially decreasing the rate of steam generation, and potentially causing boiler metals to reach failure temperatures. Boiler explosions were not uncommon until surviving boiler operators learned how to periodically clean their boilers. Some solids could be removed by cooling the boiler so differential thermal expansion caused brittle crystalline solids to crack and flake off metal boiler surfaces. Other solids were removed by acid washing or mechanical scouring. Various rates of boiler blowdown could reduce the frequency of cleaning, but efficient operation and maintenance of individual boilers was determined by trial and error until chemists devised means of measuring and adjusting water quality to minimize cleaning requirements.

== Boiler water treatment ==
Boiler water treatment is a type of industrial water treatment focused on the removal or chemical modification of substances potentially damaging to the boiler. Varying types of treatment are used at different locations to avoid scale, corrosion, or foaming. External treatment of raw water supplies intended for use within a boiler is focused on the removal of impurities before they reach the boiler. Internal treatment within the boiler is focused on limiting the tendency of water to dissolve the boiler, and maintaining impurities in forms least likely to cause trouble before they can be removed from the boiler in boiler blowdown.

== Within the boiler ==
At the elevated temperatures and pressures within a boiler, water exhibits different physical and chemical properties than those observed at room temperature and atmospheric pressure. Chemicals may be added to maintain pH levels minimizing water solubility of boiler materials while allowing efficient action of other chemicals added to prevent foaming, to consume oxygen before it corrodes the boiler, to precipitate dissolved solids before they form scale on steam-generating surfaces, and to remove those precipitates from the vicinity of the steam-generating surfaces.

=== Oxygen scavengers ===
Sodium sulphite or hydrazine may be used to maintain reducing conditions within the boiler. Sulphite is less desirable in boilers operating at pressures above 1,000 pounds per square inch (6,900 kPa); because sulfates formed by combination with oxygen may form sulfate scale or decompose into corrosive sulfur dioxide or hydrogen sulfide at elevated temperatures. Excess hydrazine may evaporate with steam to provide corrosion protection by neutralizing carbon dioxide in the steam condensate system; but it may also decompose into ammonia which will attack copper alloys. Products based on filming amines such as Helamin may be preferred for corrosion protection of condensate systems with copper alloys.

=== Coagulation ===
Boilers operating at pressures less than 200 pounds per square inch (1,400 kPa) may use unsoftened feedwater with the addition of sodium carbonate or sodium hydroxide to maintain alkaline conditions to precipitate calcium carbonate, magnesium hydroxide and magnesium silicate. Hard water treated this way causes a fairly high concentration of suspended solid particles within the boiler to serve as precipitation nuclei preventing later deposition of calcium sulfate scale. Natural organic materials like starches, tannins and lignins may be added to control crystal growth and disperse precipitates. The soft sludge of precipitates and organic materials accumulates in quiescent portions of the boiler to be removed during bottom blowdown.

=== Phosphates ===
Boiler sludge concentrations created by coagulation treatment may be avoided by sodium phosphate treatment when water hardness is less than 60 mg/L. With adequate alkalinity, addition of sodium phosphate produces an insoluble precipitate of hydroxyapatite with magnesium hydroxide and magnesium and calcium silicates. Lignin may be processed for high temperature stability to control calcium phosphate scale and magnetic iron oxide deposits. Acceptable phosphate concentrations decrease from 140 mg/L in low pressure boilers to less than 40 mg/L at pressures above 1,500 pounds per square inch (10,000 kPa). Recommended alkalinity similarly decreases from 700 mg/L to 200 mg/L over the same pressure range. Foaming problems are more common with high alkalinity.

Coordinated control of pH and phosphates attempts to limit caustic corrosion occurring from concentrations of hydroxyl ions under porous scale on steam generating surfaces within the boiler. High pressure boilers using demineralized water are most vulnerable to caustic corrosion. Hydrolysis of trisodium phosphate is a pH buffer in equilibrium with disodium phosphate and sodium hydroxide.

=== Chelants ===
Chelants like ethylenediaminetetraacetic acid (EDTA) or nitrilotriacetic acid (NTA) form complex ions with calcium and magnesium. Solubility of these complex ions may reduce blowdown requirements if anionic carboxylate polymers are added to control scale formation. Potential decomposition at high temperatures limits chelant use to boilers operating at pressures less than 1,500 pounds per square inch (10,000 kPa). Decomposition products may cause metal corrosion in areas of stress and high temperature.

== Feedwater ==
Many large boilers including those used in thermal power stations recycle condensed steam for re-use within the boiler. Steam condensate is distilled water, but it may contain dissolved gases. A deaerator is often used to convert condensate to feedwater by removing potentially damaging gases including oxygen, carbon dioxide, ammonia and hydrogen sulfide. Inclusion of a polisher (an Ion exchange vessel) helps to maintain water purity, and in particular protect the boiler from a condenser tube leak.

== Make-up water ==
All boilers lose some water in steam leaks; and some is intentionally wasted as boiler blowdown to remove impurities accumulating within the boiler. Steam locomotives and boilers generating steam for use in direct contact with contaminating materials may not recycle condensed steam. Replacement water is required to continue steam production. Make-up water is initially treated to remove floating and suspended materials. Hard water intended for low-pressure boilers may be softened by substituting sodium for divalent cations of dissolved calcium and magnesium most likely to cause carbonate and sulfate scale. High-pressure boilers typically require water demineralized by reverse osmosis, distillation or ion-exchange.

== See also ==
- Dealkalization of water

== Sources ==
- Babbitt, Harold E. & Doland, James J. (1949). Water Supply Engineering. McGraw-Hill.
- Betz Laboratories (1976). Handbook of Industrial Water Conditioning (7th ed.). Betz Laboratories.
- Kemmer, Frank N. (1979). The NALCO Water Handbook. McGraw-Hill.
- Linsley, Ray K. & Franzini, Joseph B. (1972). Water-Resources Engineering. McGraw-Hill. ISBN 0-07-037959-9.
- Perry, Robert H.; Chilton, Cecil H.; Kirkpatrick, Sidney D. (1963). Chemical Engineers' Handbook (4th ed.). McGraw-Hill.
- Woodruff, Everett B.; Lammers, Herbert B.; Lammers, Thomas F. (1984). Steam-Plant Operation (5th ed.). McGraw-Hill. ISBN 0-07-071732-X.
