= Descaling agent =

Substance used to remove limescale from surfaces

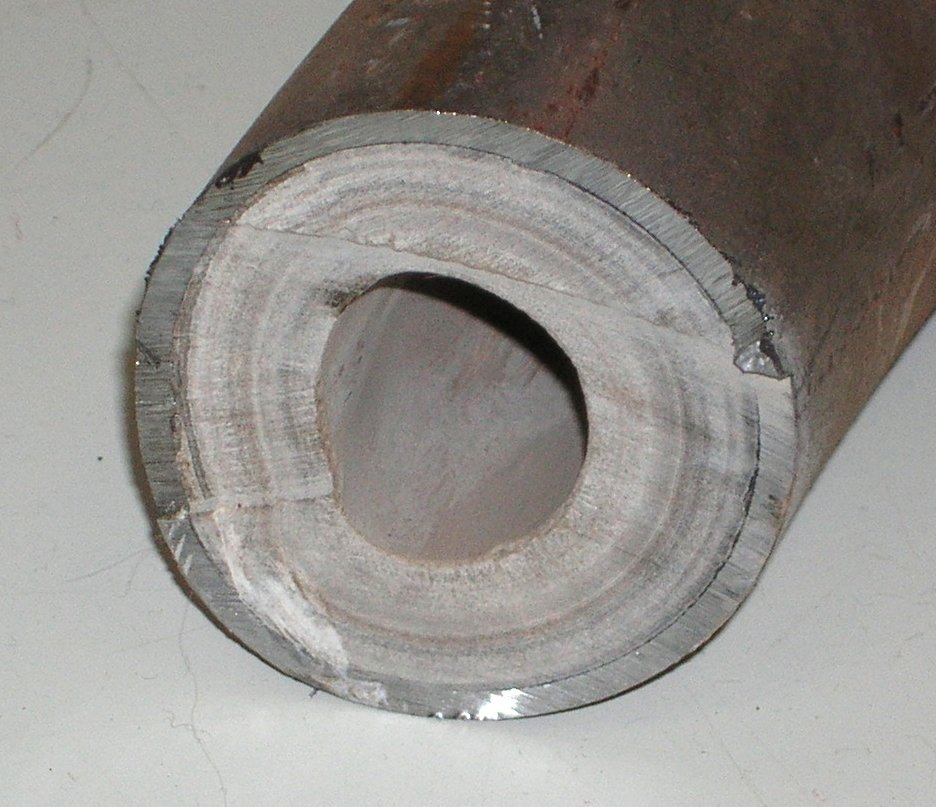
Limescale build-up inside a pipe reduces both liquid flow and thermal conduction from the pipe, so will reduce thermal efficiency when used as a heat exchanger.

A descaling agent or chemical descaler is a liquid chemical substance used to remove limescale from metal surfaces in contact with hot water, such as in boilers, water heaters, and kettles. Limescale is either white or brown in colour due to the presence of iron compounds. Glass surfaces may also exhibit scaling stains, as can many ceramic surfaces present in bathrooms and kitchen, and descaling agents can be used safely to remove those stains without affecting the substrate since both ceramics and glass are unreactive to most acids.

== Action ==
Descaling agents are typically acidic compounds such as hydrochloric acid that react with the calcium carbonate and magnesium carbonate compounds present in the scale, producing carbon dioxide gas and a soluble salt.

CaCO_{3} (s) + 2 H^{+} (aq) → Ca^{2+} (aq) + CO_{2} (g) + H_{2}O (l)

MgCO_{3} (s) + 2 H^{+} (aq) → Mg^{2+} (aq) + CO_{2} (g) + H_{2}O (l)

Strongly acidic descaling agents are usually corrosive to the eyes and skin and can also attack and degrade clothing fibres, so appropriate protection such as rubber gloves and plastic aprons should be used in cleaning operations.

Descaling can also cause erosion and dezincification of brass, causing the brass to leach lead which is thereby released into potable water lines. Descaling of steam boilers such as those found in espresso machines can be difficult as the boilers do not fill completely and the descaling agent is unable to reach the top of the boiler. If this problem occurs the device's safety valves, probes, and pressure sensors may not be cleared of limescale.

== Acids used ==
Notable descaling agents include acetic acid, citric acid, glycolic acid, formic acid, lactic acid, phosphoric acid, sulfamic acid and hydrochloric acid. The calcium salts are soluble and thus washed away during dissolution or solvation. The speed of the descaling action depends on the concentration and acidity or pH of the solution provided. Hydrochloric acid is much stronger than acetic acid, for example, and therefore tends to remove scale faster. Weak acids such as acetic or citric acids may be preferred, however, where damage to the substrate is to be minimised.

Many companies offer inhibited or "buffered" acids that inhibit the corrosive effect of the acids on various materials. Approximately 10% concentrated hydrochloric acid with a corrosion inhibitor and some added penetrating and wetting agents added is typical. This allows for a better cleaning of machinery and especially heat exchangers because often the scale is mixed with silica and other contaminants. These additives reduce the corrosion on the metals and cut through and loosen these other materials mixed with the scale for faster and more thorough cleaning.

== See also ==
- Central heating system
- Dealkalization of water
- Hard water
- Hydronics
- Limescale
- Pickling (metal)
- Water softening
