= Condensate pump =

Pump used in heating or cooling

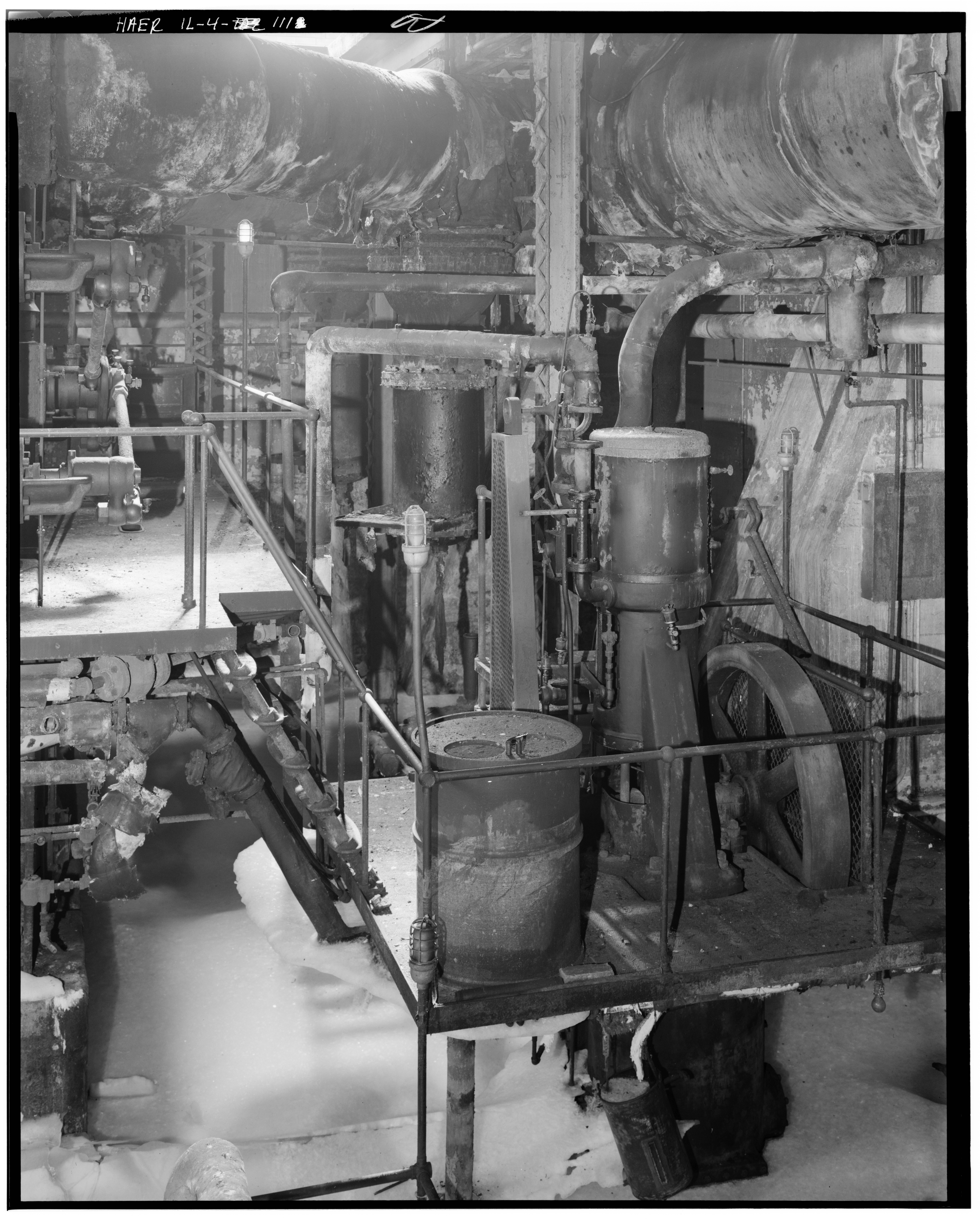
Air condensate pump. Note main discharge header above steam-end cylinder. Note also the 30' discharge valve and actuator to the left of the pump. - Lakeview Pumping Station, Clarendon and Montrose Avenues, Chicago, Cook County, IL}

A condensate pump is a specific type of pump used to pump the condensate (water) produced in an HVAC (heating or cooling), refrigeration, condensing boiler furnace, or steam system.

== Applications ==
Condensate pumps may be used to pump the condensate produced from latent water vapor in any of the following gas mixtures:

- Conditioned (cooled or heated) building air
- Refrigerated air in cooling and freezing systems
- Steam in heat exchangers and radiators
- The exhaust stream of very-high-efficiency furnaces

Condensate recovery systems help reduce three tangible costs of producing steam:

- Fuel/energy costs
- Boiler water make-up and sewage treatment
- Boiler water chemical treatment

== Construction and operation ==
Condensate pumps are used in hydronic systems that cannot discharge excess condensate water via a gravity feed. Condensate pumps are usually electrically powered centrifugal pumps. They are used to remove condensate water from HVAC systems that cannot be accomplished via gravity, and therefore the water must be pumped up. Home units are often small and the pumps are rated at a fraction of a horsepower, but in commercial applications, the pumps and motors are much higher. Large industrial pumps may also serve as the feedwater pump for returning the condensate under pressure to a boiler.

Condensate pumps usually run intermittently and have a tank in which condensate can accumulate. Eventually, the accumulating liquid raises a float switch energizing the pump. The pump then runs until the level of liquid in the tank is substantially lowered. Some pumps contain a two-stage switch. As liquid rises to the trigger point of the first stage, the pump is activated. If the liquid continues to rise (perhaps because the pump has failed or its discharge is blocked), the second stage will be triggered. This stage may switch off the HVAC equipment (preventing the production of further condensate), trigger an alarm, or both.

Some systems may include two pumps to empty the tank. In this case, the two pumps often alternate operation, and a two-stage switch serves to energize the on-duty pump at the first stage and then energize the remaining pump at the second stage. This second stage action is in addition to any triggering of other system changes as noted for a single pump installation. In this way pump runtime is shared between the two, and a backup pump is provided in case one pump fails to function.

Small pumps have tanks that range from 2 to 4 liters (0.5 to 1 gallon) and are usually supported using the flanges on their tanks or simply placed upon the floor. A plastic impeller in a molded volute at the bottom of the pump provides the pumping action; this impeller is connected to the motor via a metal shaft that extends downwards from the motor mounted above the tank's top. Large pumps are usually pad-mounted drawing liquid from a tank (sump) below the floor. The smallest pumps may have no tank at all and are simply placed within a container such as the drip pan of a dehumidifier appliance.

In most locales, condensate water must be pumped to the outside of the dwelling; generally feeding condensate water into sewer pipes is not permitted. Further, this would require a trap, to ensure sewer gas does not backfeed into a dwelling.

== Steam condensate ==
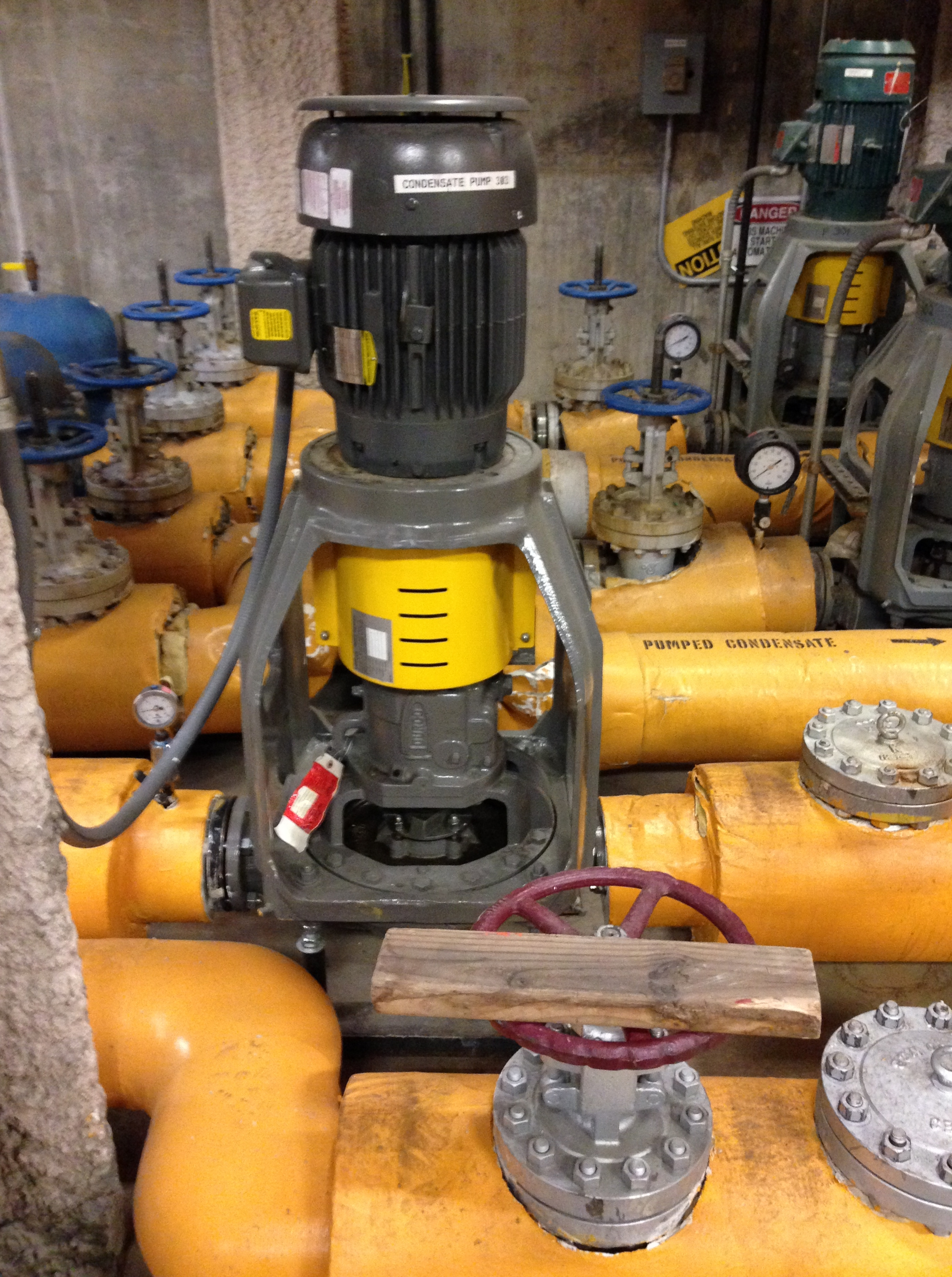
Condensate return pump

In industrial steam systems the condensate pump is used to collect and return condensate from remote areas of the plant. The steam produced in the boiler can heat equipment and processes a considerable distance away. Once steam is used it turns to hot water or condensate. This pump and possibly many more around the plant returns this hot water back to a make-up tank closer to the boiler, where it can be reclaimed, chemically treated, and reused, in the boiler, consequently it can sometimes be referred to as a condensate return pump.

In a steam power plant, particularly shipboard ones, the condensate pump is normally located adjacent to the main condenser hotwell often directly below it. This pump sends the water to a make-up tank closer to the steam generator or boiler. If the tank is also designed to remove dissolved oxygen from the condensate, it is known as a deaereating feed tank (DFT). The output of the DFT supplies the feed booster pump which, in turn, supplies the feedwater pump which returns the feedwater to the boiler so the cycle can start over. Two pumps in succession are used to provide sufficient net positive suction head to prevent cavitation and the subsequent damage associated with it.

This pump is usually associated with a much larger tank, float switch, and an electric motor than the example above. Some systems are so remote that steam power is used to return the condensate where electricity is impractical to provide.

== Disposal ==
The output of small condensate pumps is usually routed to a sewer, plumbing drain, or the outside world via PVC plastic tubing (condensate drain line). In some locales, condensate water is not permitted to enter a sewer system and must be directed to the outside of the house, usually into the leader/gutter downspout system, or the stormwater drainage system.

If the outlet of the line is at a higher level than the tank of the pump, a check valve is often fitted at the outlet of the pump so that liquid cannot flow backwards into the pump's tank. If the outlet is below the tank level, siphonage usually naturally clears the output line of all liquid when the pump is de-energized. In cold regions of the world, it is important that condensate lines that are routed outside be carefully designed so that no water can remain in the line to freeze up; this would block the line from further operation.

Condensate water is distilled water, but may also contain contaminants. If it is being condensed from an air stream, it may have entrained dust, microbes, or other contaminants in it. If it is condensed from steam, it may have traces of the various boiler water treatment chemicals. If it is condensed from furnace exhaust gases, it may be acidic, containing sulfuric acid or nitric acid as a result of sulfur and nitrogen dioxides in the exhaust gas stream. Steam and exhaust condensate is usually hot. These various factors may combine (along with local regulations) to require careful handling or even chemical treatment of the condensate, and condensate pumps used for these services must be appropriately designed.

== Safety ==
Condensate pumps have been involved in industrial accidents. In one case, a 2,600 US gallons per minute (160 L/s) steam condensate pump exploded when it was operated with its suction and discharge valves closed. The force of the explosion was such that it propelled a 5-pound (2.3 kg) piece of metal casing over 400 feet (120 m) away from the site of the explosion.

== See also ==
- Drain
- Drain pan
