= Deaeration =

Deaeration may refer to:

- the action of a deaerator
- Degassing, the removal of dissolved gases from liquids

== See also ==
- Air-free technique
