= Outline of water =

Overview of and topical guide to water

Faucet dripping water.

Structure of the water molecule (H_{2}O)

The following outline is provided as an overview of and topical guide to water:

Water – chemical substance with the chemical formula H_{2}O. A water molecule contains one oxygen and two hydrogen atoms connected by covalent bonds. Water is a liquid at ambient conditions, but it often co-exists on Earth with its solid state, ice, and gaseous state (water vapor or steam). Under nomenclature used to name chemical compounds, Dihydrogen monoxide is the scientific name for water, though it is almost never used.

== History ==
- History of water supply and sanitation
- 1854 Broad Street cholera outbreak – Severe outbreak of cholera that occurred in London in 1854
- History of water filters
- The identification of water as a substance
  - Henry Cavendish (1731-1810) - English scientist who produced water while experimenting with burning hydrogen in oxygen
  - Antoine Lavoisier (1743-1794) - French chemist who demonstrated that water is a compound made of oxygen and hydrogen

== Health ==
- Waterborne disease – Disease caused by agents transmitted by water
  - Cholera – Bacterial infection of the small intestine
- WASH – Water, sanitation and hygiene services

== Chemical properties and use ==
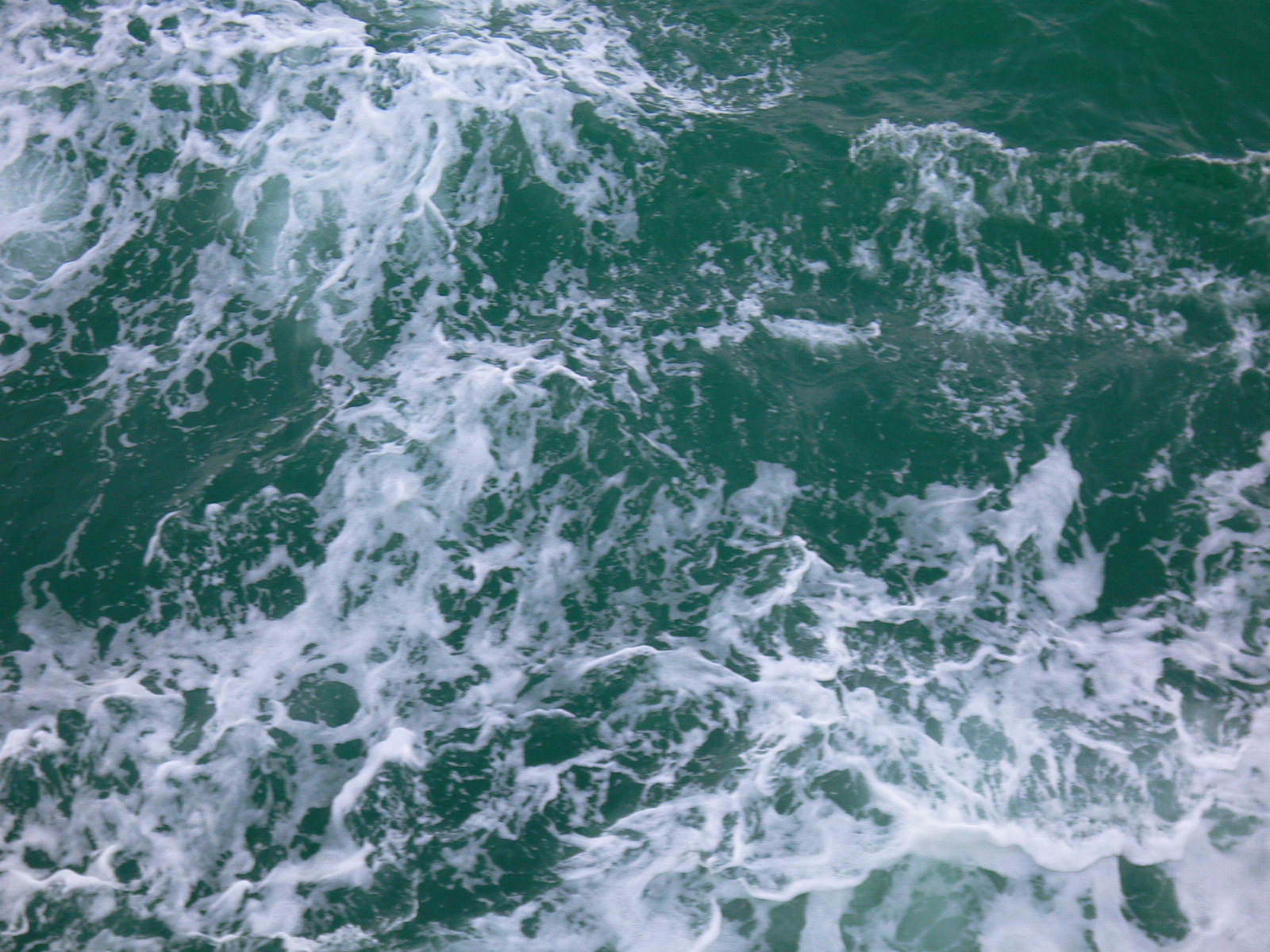
Seawater.

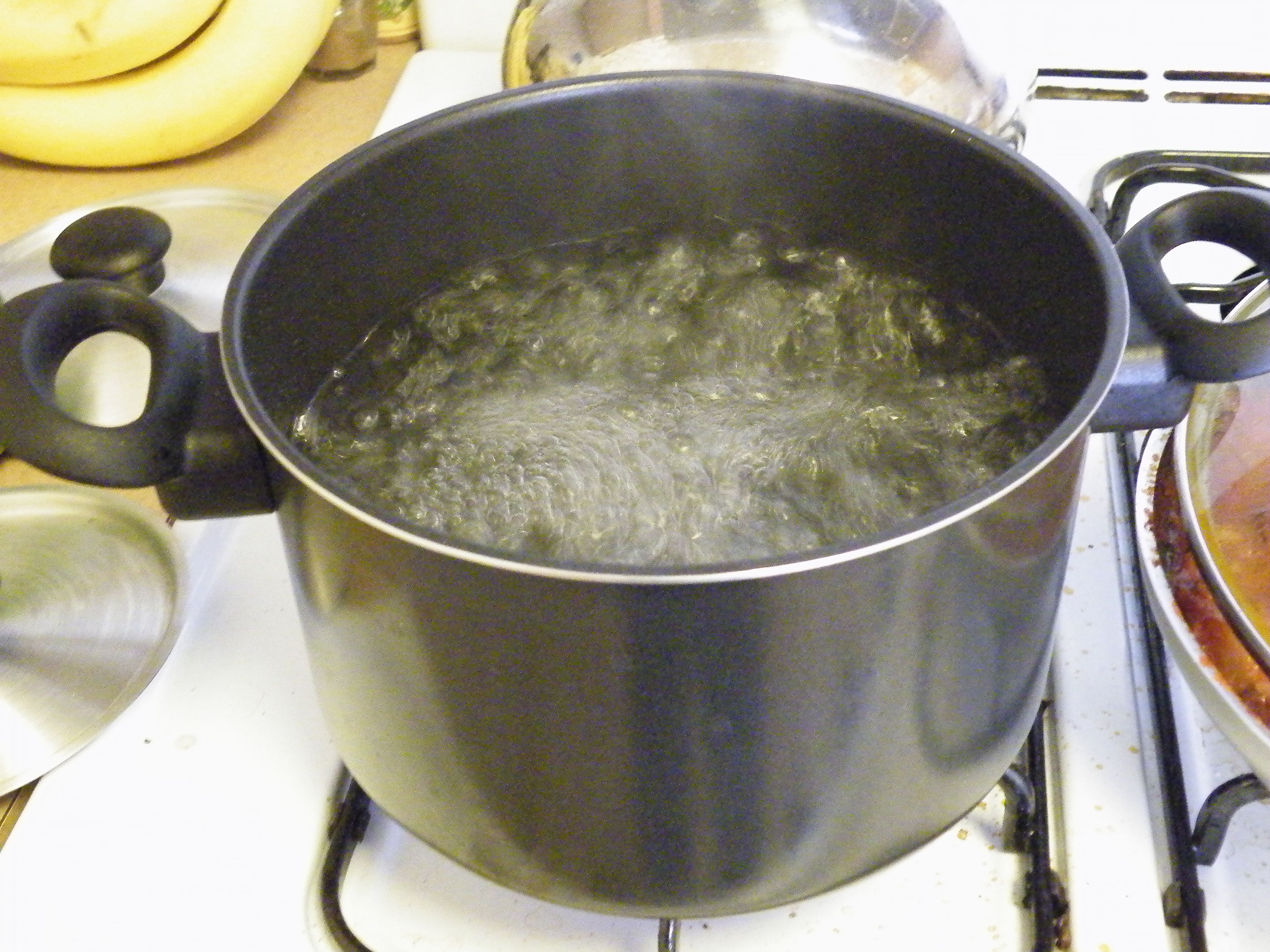
Boiling water.

- Properties of water – Physical and chemical properties of pure water
- Electrolysis of water – Electricity-induced chemical reaction
- Water of crystallization – Water molecules present inside crystals
- Dealkalization of water – Removal of alkalinity ions from water
- Drinking water quality standards – Quality parameters set for drinking water
- Portable water purification – Self-contained, easily transported units used to purify water from untreated sources
- Self-ionization of water – Autoprotolysis or exchange of a proton between two water molecules
- Water-in-water emulsion
- Water purification – Process of removing impurities from water
- Water treatment – Process that improves the quality of water
- Water (data page) – Chemical data page for water
- Hard water – Water that has a high mineral content
- Soft water – Water that has a low mineral content
  - Water softening – Removing positive ions from hard water
- Water absorption
- Heavy water – Deuterium oxide
- Distilled water – Water purified by condensing it from steam
- Salinity – Proportion of salt dissolved in water
  - Saline water – Water that contains a high concentration of dissolved salts
  - Seawater – Water from a sea or an ocean
- Hydrate – Substance containing water or its constituent elements
- Boiling – Physical process

== Physical properties ==
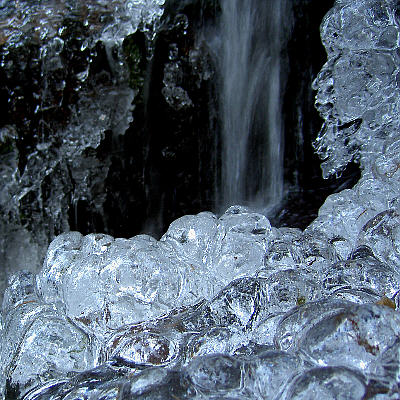
Frozen water, that is, ice.

- Properties of water – Physical and chemical properties of pure water
  - Color of water – Water color in different conditions
  - Water vapor – Gaseous phase of water
    - Vapour pressure of water – Pressure exerted by molecules of water vapor in gaseous form
    - Steam – Water in the gas phase
  - Ice – Frozen water; the solid state of water
  - Optical properties of water and ice
  - Water quality – Assessment against standards for use
  - Water (data page) – Chemical data page for water
- Mineral water – Drinking water from a mineral spring

== Geography ==
The Water Cycle

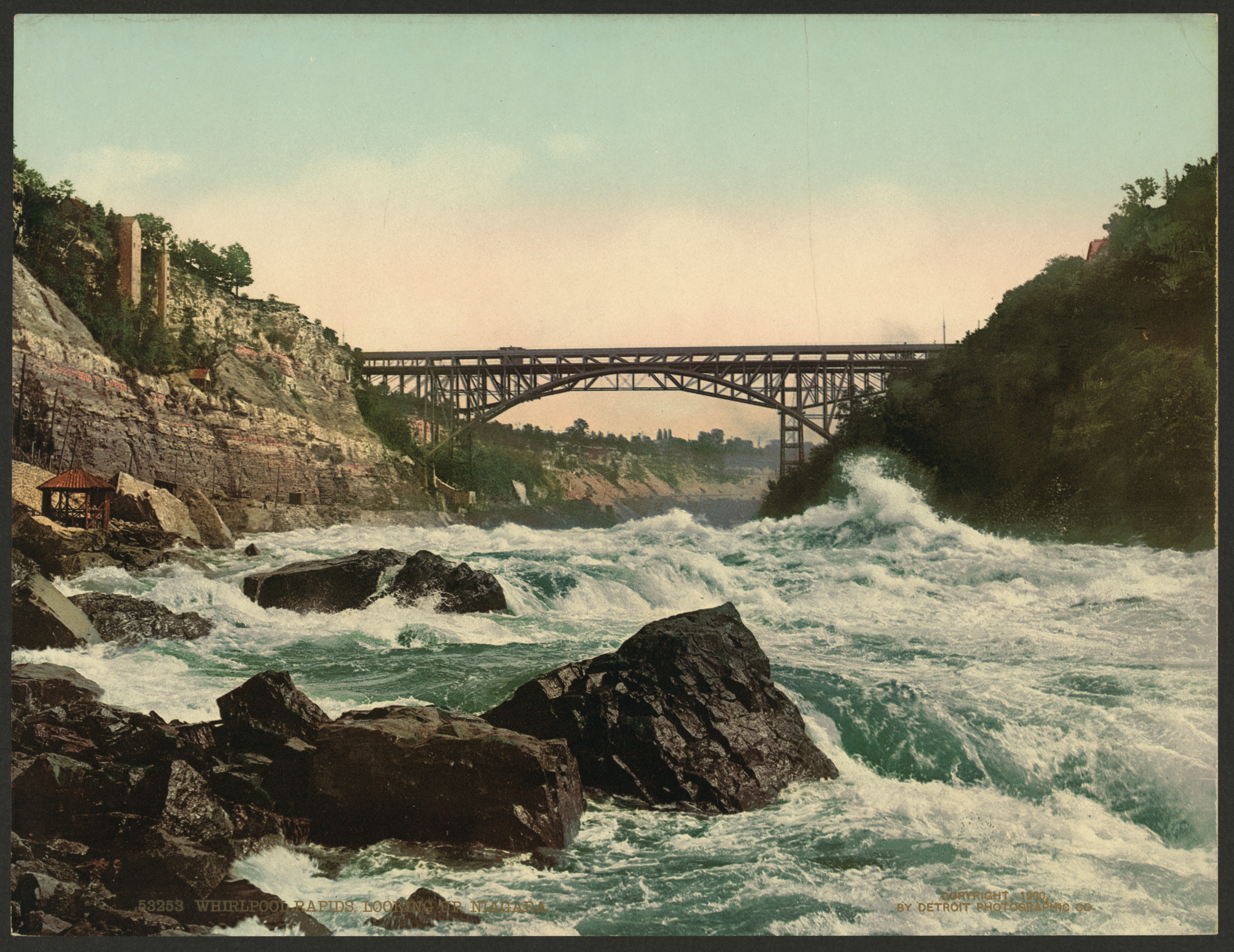
Rapidly flowing river.

Formation of a waterfall

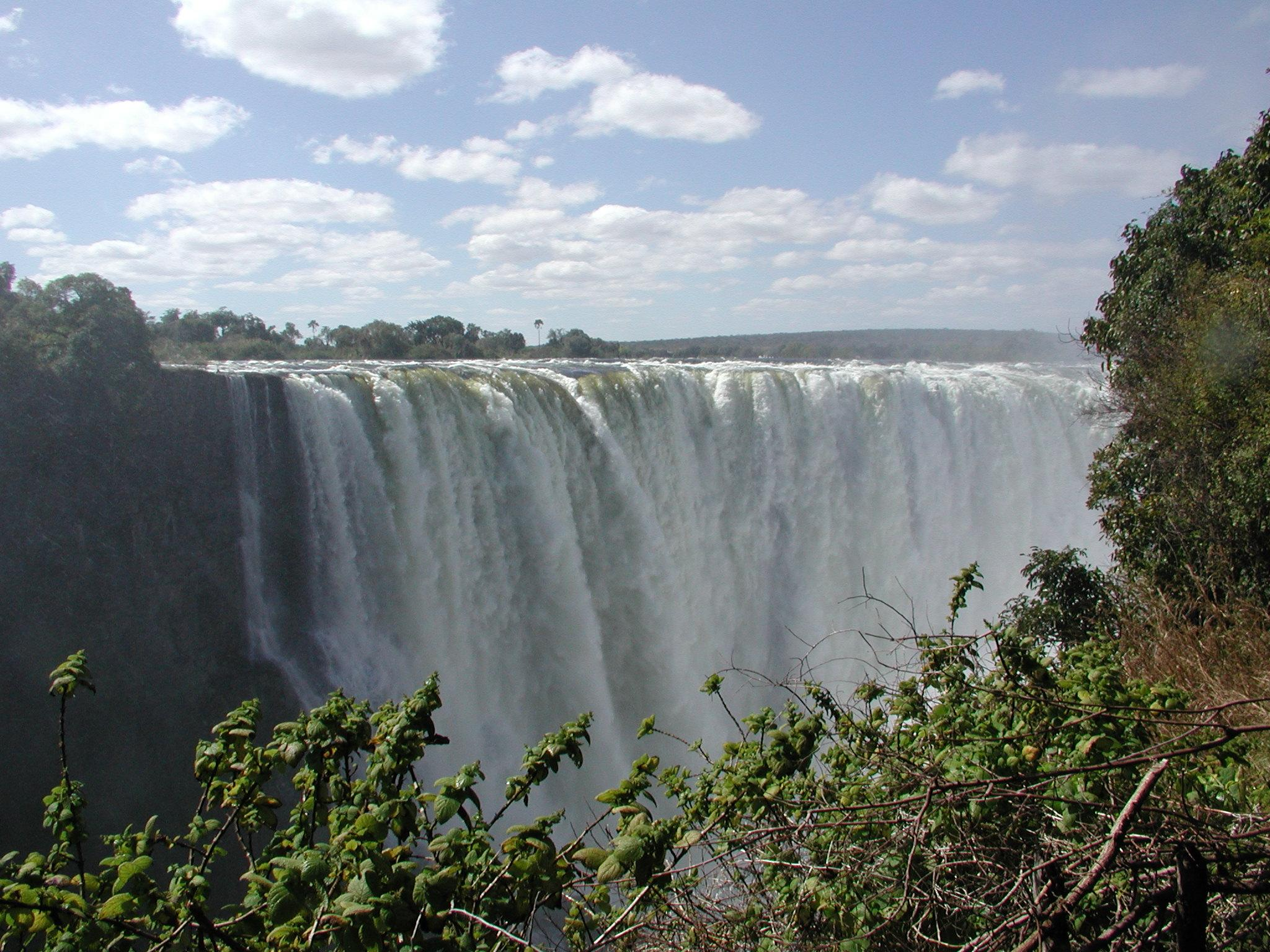
Victoria Falls

- Origin of water on Earth – Hypotheses for the possible sources of the water on Earth
  - Evolution of water on Mars and Earth
- Extraterrestrial liquid water – Liquid water naturally occurring outside Earth
  - Water on terrestrial planets of the Solar System
    - Lunar water – Presence of water on the Moon
    - Water on Mars – Study of past and present water on Mars
  - List of extrasolar candidates for liquid water
- Hydrosphere – Liquid water on a planet
  - Hydrology – Science of the movement, distribution, and quality of water on Earth
    - Water distribution on Earth
  - Water cycle – Biogeochemical cycle for movement of water on Earth
  - Groundwater – Water located beneath the ground surface
- Body of water – Any significant accumulation of water, generally on a planet's surface
  - Salt water – Water that contains a high concentration of dissolved salts
    - Seawater – Water from a sea or an ocean
    - Ocean – Body of salt water covering most of Earth
    - Sea – Large body of salt water
      - Tide – Change in sea level due to gravity
    - Brine – Concentrated solution of salt in water
    - Brackish water – Water with salinity between freshwater and seawater
  - Fresh water – Naturally occurring water with low amounts of dissolved salts
    - Aquifer – Underground water-bearing rock
    - River – Natural flowing freshwater stream
    - Drainage – Removal of water from an area of land
      - Drainage divide – Elevated terrain that separates neighbouring drainage basins
      - Drainage basin – Land area where water converges to a common outlet
    - Lake – Large inland body of relatively still water
- Glacier – Persistent body of ice that moves downhill under its own weight
- Geyser – Natural explosive eruption of hot water
- Spring – A point at which water emenges from an aquifer to the surface
- Waterfall – Point in a river or brook where water flows over a vertical drop
  - List of waterfalls

=== Weather ===
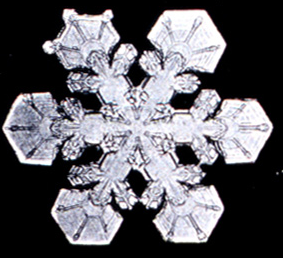
A snowflake.

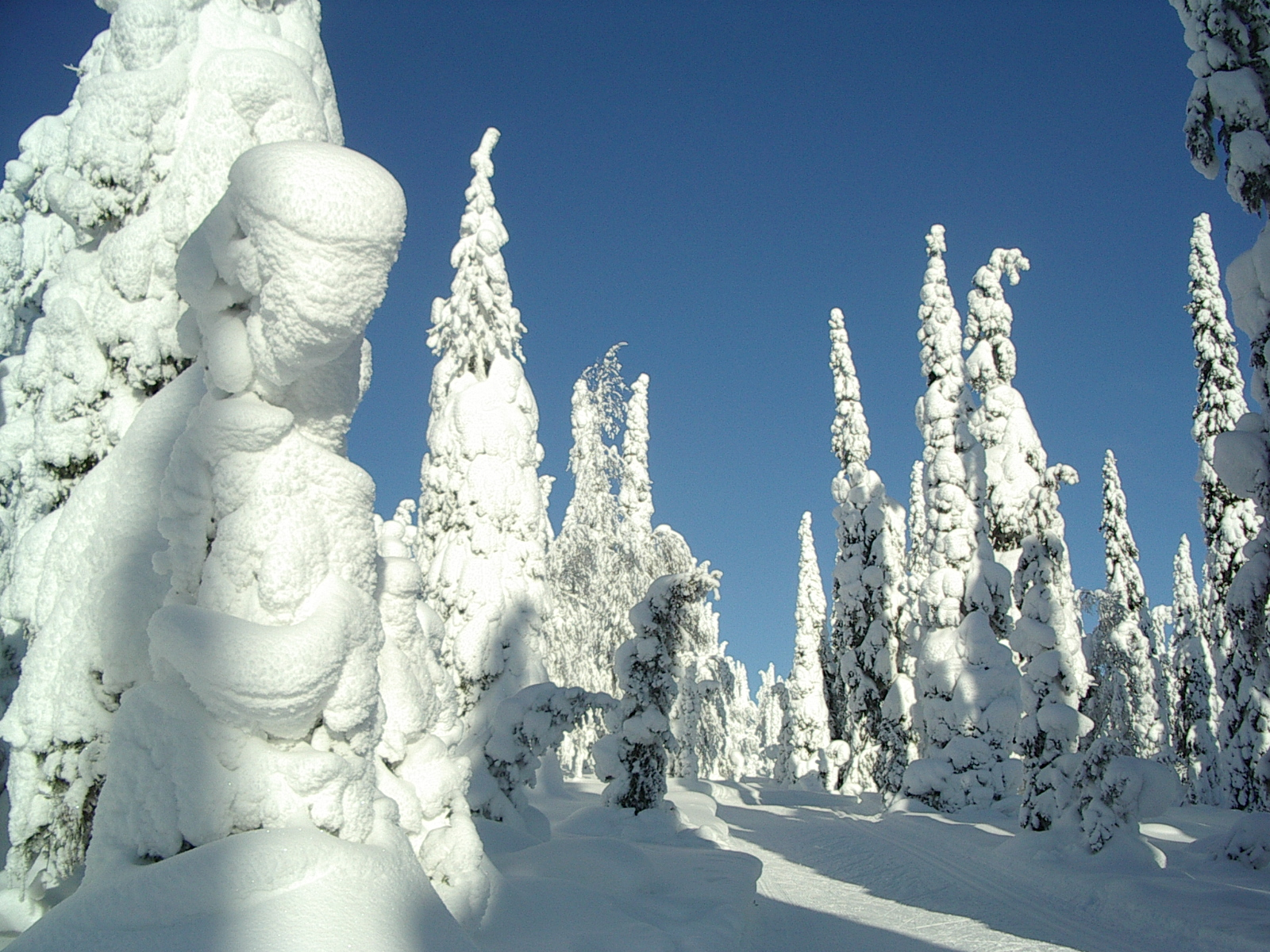
Snow-covered trees.

- Precipitation (meteorology) – Condensed water vapor that falls from clouds
  - Rain – Form of precipitation
  - Freezing rain – Rain maintained at temperatures below freezing
  - Drizzle – Light liquid precipitation
  - Snow – Precipitation in the form of ice crystal flakes
  - Snow pellets – Precipitation that forms when supercooled droplets of water freeze on a falling snowflake
  - Snow grains – Form of precipitation
  - Ice pellets – Precipitation consisting of small, translucent balls of ice
  - Hail – Form of solid precipitation
  - Ice crystals – Water ice in symmetrical shapes
  - Dew – Droplets of water that form in the morning or evening
  - Frost – Coating or deposit of ice
    - Hoarfrost – Coating or deposit of ice
  - Atmospheric icing – Weather condition in which water droplets freeze onto objects they come in contact with
  - Glaze ice – Coating of ice on objects
- Cloud – Visible mass of particles suspended in the atmospheres
- Fog – Atmospheric phenomenon
- Mist – Phenomenon caused by small droplets of water suspended in air
- Spindrift – Spray blown from cresting waves in gales
- Flood – Water overflow submerging usually-dry land
- Wave – Dynamic disturbance in a medium or field
  - Wind wave – Surface waves generated by wind on open water
  - Tsunami – Series of water waves
- Drought – Period with less precipitation than normal

== In nature and life ==
- Origin of water on Earth – Hypotheses for the possible sources of the water on Earth
  - Evolution of water on Mars and Earth
- Water intoxication – Potentially fatal overhydration
- Drinking water – Water safe for consumption
- Drowning – Respiratory impairment caused by submersion in liquid
- Dehydration – Deficit of total body water

=== Marine and aquatic life ===
- Underwater – Aquatic or submarine environment
- Marine biology – Scientific study of ocean life
- Marine life – Organisms that live in salt water
- Hydrobiology – Science of life and life processes in water
  - Aquatic ecosystem – Ecosystem in a body of water

== Politics and issues ==
- Hydraulic empire – Government by control of access to water
- Human right to water and sanitation
- Water politics – Politics affected by the availability of water and water resources
  - Water politics in the Middle East
  - Water politics in the Jordan River basin – Political issues arising from or related to the water of the Jordan River
- Water law – Law and regulations that relate to water resources
- Water right – Right of a user to use water from a water source
- Water resources – Sources of water that are potentially useful for humans
  - Water resources of the People's Republic of China – Geography, cleanliness, and access to water
  - Water resources of Singapore
- Reuse of water bottles – Waste management
- Water scarcity – Situation where there is a shortage of water
- Water crisis (disambiguation)
  - Water conservation – Policies for sustainable development of water use
    - Water efficiency – Practice of reducing water consumption
    - Water footprint – Extent of water use in relation to consumption by people
- Water industry – Drinking and wastewater services
  - Water privatization – Private sector participation in the provision of water services and sanitation
  - Water management – Sources of water that are potentially useful for humans
- Water conflicts – Conflict over an access to water resources
- Water export – Outbound trade involving freshwater
- Water pollution – Contamination of water bodies

=== Supply and sanitation ===
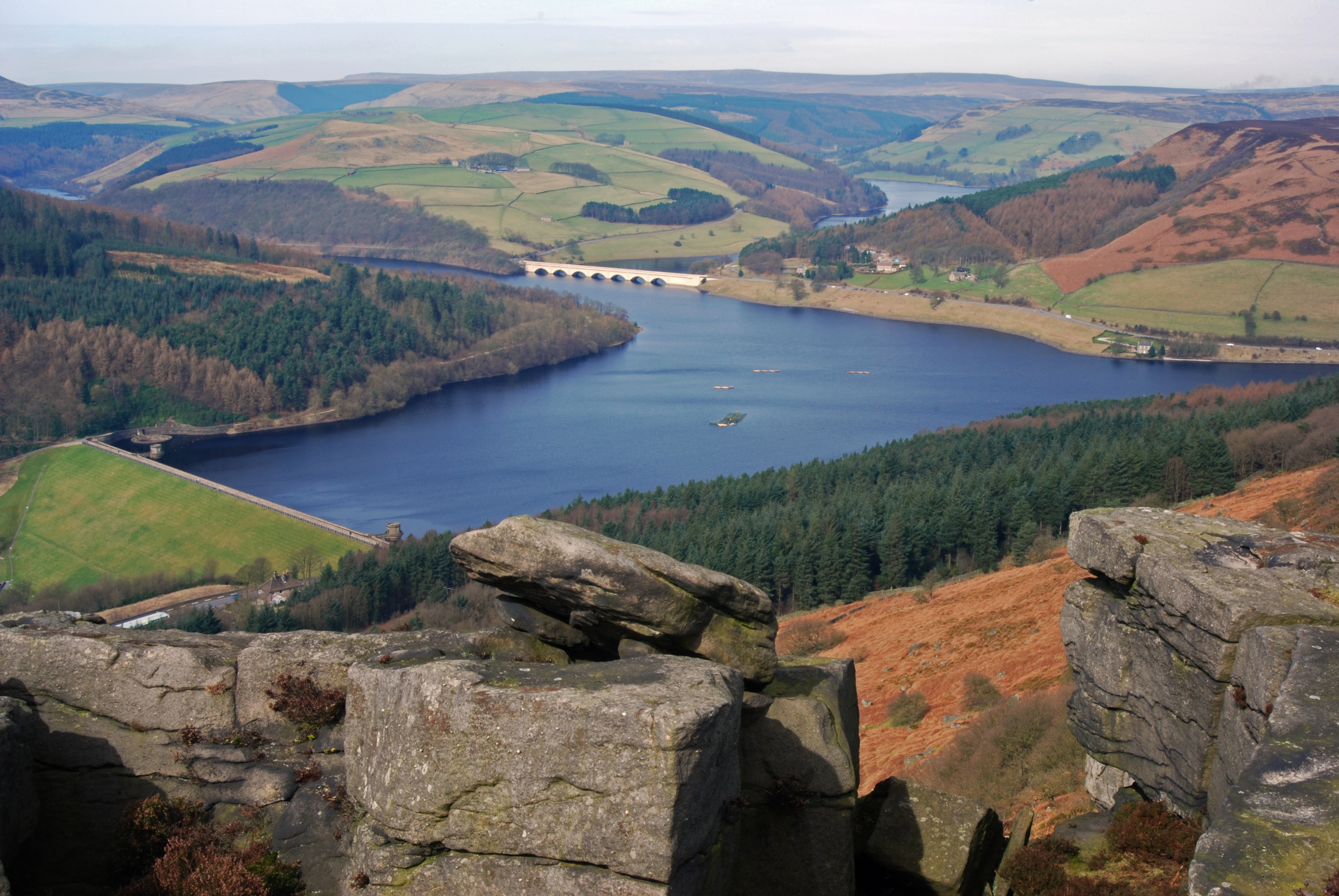
An example of a Reservoir, Ladybower Reservoir.

- Water supply – Provision of water by public utilities, commercial organisations or others
  - Water supply network – System of engineered hydrologic and hydraulic components providing water
    - Reservoir – Storage space for water
    - Dam – Barrier that stops or slows the flow of water
    - Water tower – Elevated structure supporting a tank
    - Aqueduct – Structure constructed to convey water
    - Pump – Device that imparts energy to fluids by mechanical action
    - Water well – Excavation or structure to provide access to groundwater
    - Drinking Fountain – Decorative structure that jets water
    - Water pipe – Systems for conveying fluids
      - Plumbing – Systems for conveying fluids
    - Tap (valve) – Valve controlling the release of a liquid or gas
- Sanitation – Public health conditions related to clean water and proper excreta and sewage disposal
- Drinking water – Water safe for consumption
- Water fluoridation – Addition of fluoride to a water supply to reduce tooth decay
  - Opposition to water fluoridation – Debate over the anti-tooth-decay measure

== In culture and sport ==
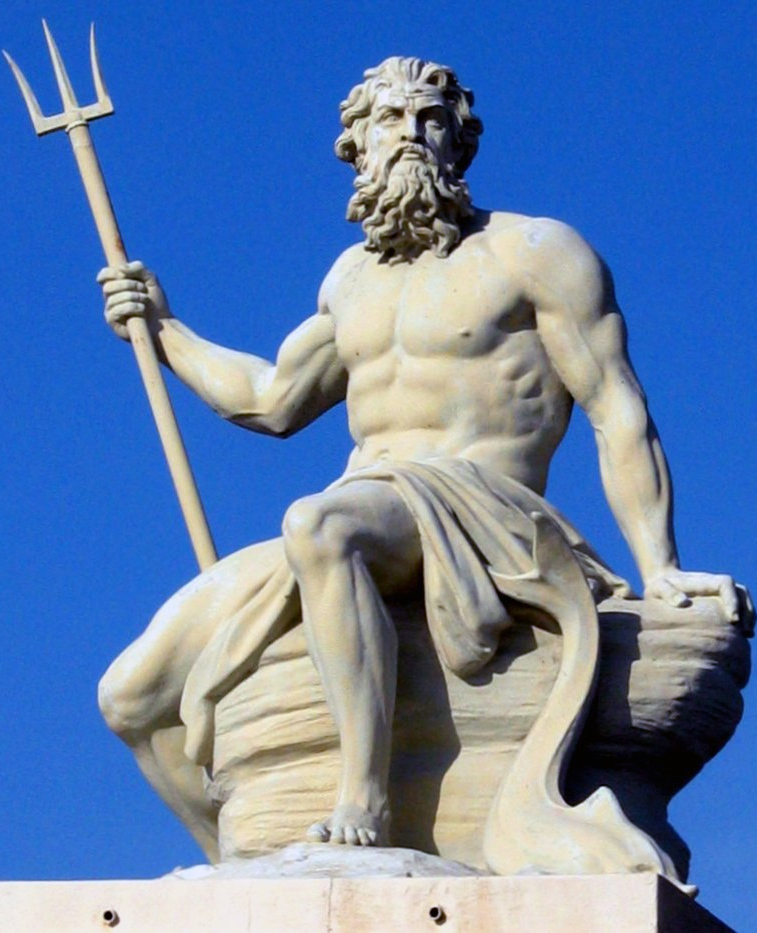
Poseidon, Greek god of water. The Roman water god, Neptune, was almost identical to Poseidon

- Water deity
- Water (classical element) – One of four primary substances in antiquity
- Holy water – Water blessed by a religious figure
- Adam's ale – Colloquial allusion to water
- Water sports )
  - List of water sports
    - Swimming – Water-based sport
    - Water polo – Competitive team sport played in water
  - Underwater sports – Competitive underwater recreational activities
- Winter sports – Sports or recreational activities which are played on snow or ice
- Water gun – Type of toy gun designed to shoot water
- Water fight – Type of mock combat
- Fountain – Decorative structure that jets water
- Underwater diving – Descending below the surface of the water to interact with the environment

== Uses ==
- Bathing – Washing of the body with a liquid
  - Sink – Bowl-shaped plumbing fixture
  - Bathtub – Large container for holding water in which a person may bathe
  - Shower – Place in which a person bathes under a spray of water
- Drinking – Ingestion of water or other liquids
  - Drinking water – Water safe for consumption
  - Tap water – Water supplied through a pipe and tap combination
  - Bottled water – Water sold as a bottled product
  - Drinking vessel
    - Glass (drinkware)
- Use of water in fire fighting – Actions to prevent damage from fire
- Irrigation – Agricultural artificial application of water to land
- Professional diving – Underwater diving where divers are paid for their work
- Naval warfare – Combat involving sea-going ships
- Washing – Method of cleaning
  - Pressure washing – Use of high-pressure water jet for cleaning hard surfaces
- Water transport – Transport of people or goods via waterways
- Water clock – Timepiece in which time is measured by the flow of liquid into or out of a vessel
- Water-based sources of power
  - Water wheel – Machine powered by flowing or falling water
  - Hydroelectricity – Electricity generated by hydropower
  - Hydropower – Power generation via movement of water
  - Marine current power – Extraction of power from ocean currents
  - Marine energy – Energy available from oceans
  - Osmotic power – Sustainable energy from sea and river water
  - Tidal power – Technology to convert the energy from tides into useful forms of power
  - Wave power – Transport of energy by wind waves, and the capture of that energy to do useful work
    - Water turbine – Type of turbine
    - Steam engine – Engine that uses steam to perform mechanical work
    - Tidal stream generator – Type of tidal power generation technology

== See also ==
- Hydrological Ensemble Prediction Experiment
