= Chemical fouling inhibitors =

Chemical fouling inhibitors are products that are mixtures of fouling and corrosion inhibitors use in boiler feedwater treatment. Several of these products use aliphatic polyamines to coat the surface of pipes.

== Helamin ==
Helamin is a boiler feedwater treatment based on amines and polyamines. Helamin is a registered trademark of Helamin Technology Holding SA, Switzerland. Patents have been obtained for Helamin products, and in 2016, the following patents exist: EP1045045, JP4663046, HK1032080, BR9903614. Chemically, most of the Helamin types are stated by the manufacturer to be a "mixture of polyamines and polycarboxylates in aqueous solution", but some also utilize volatile amines, ammonia, polyelectrolytes, organic polymers, and scavengers of dissolved oxygen.

In contrast to the conventional method of the water treatment, its action is based on a preventive protection of the surfaces. Helamin forms a film (i.e., is one of numerous available "filming amines"), which prevents corrosion and fouling on the water-side walls in steam boilers and piping systems, due to the affinity of Helamin to metal and oxide surfaces. Crystals which form in the presence of Helamine are isolated, so that they do not tend to group themselves. Thus deposit consolidation is inhibited. Already existing oxide surface deposits are gradually removed. In the boiler, a fine, liquid mud, which is easier to remove from the boiler walls, develops.

Helamin does not significantly decompose even at high temperature and pressure employed in the modern sub-critical -water power-plant boilers. Helamin treatment can be successfully employed in steam generators, warm and hot water piping systems, superheaters, as well as cooling circuits to mitigate some of the difficult problems of the corrosion and fouling. However, cation conductivity of water tends to increase with the use of Helamin.

== Fineamin ==
Fineamin is an anticorrosion water treatment technology based on filming polyamines and dispersive polymers. The manufacturing of the amine-based technology is done in Switzerland by h2o facilities SA, Geneva and it is ISO9001:2015 and ISO14001:2015 certified. Chemically, the Fineamin products are described by the manufacturer to be a "mixture of polyamines and polycarboxylates in aqueous solution", but some contain also volatile and neutralizing amines, organic polymers and/or organic oxygen scavengers (DEHA).

Fineamin reacts by forming a protective, homogeneous film on all metal surfaces, improving the existing magnetite layer and acting as a barrier against water carryover and residual oxygen. It prevents the contact of the electrolyte with the metal surface without reducing the heat transfer, while any crystals which do form in its presence are isolated, and any tendency of accumulation is inhibited. Any existing corrosion products and deposits get dispersed and gently removed.

Fineamin treatment is used against corrosion and fouling in steam boilers, warm and hot water piping systems, superheaters, as well as cooling circuits.

Fineamin is an environmentally friendly technology and does not significantly decompose even at high temperature and pressure required by the modern power-plant boilers. It can be used in steam water circuits with pressures up to 220 bar and temperatures up to 540°C due to a very low degradation ratio. Fineamin generates ammonia and acetate in an almost insignificant quantity – as low as 1 ppb for 1 ppm of dosed product. However, cation conductivity of water tends to increase with the use of Fineamin. The treatment also has an alkalizing effect on the boiler feed water and steam (the pH is maintained at optimal values).

Fineamin was developed in accordance with TÜV requirements and it holds the following certifications:

- Readily biodegradable, with a biodegradability rate of 90% by Eurofins Ecotoxicologie France (Test report n° 20FER6-1175 – 2020/12/09);
- Safe for district heating - independently tested by the Institute of Hygiene of Ruhrgebiets (DIN EN 1717 and DIN 1988-100) and approved as being fit for usage in district heating systems and domestic hot water production;
- Acceptable for treating boilers, steam lines and / or cooling systems in food industry (G6 – This product is acceptable for treating boilers or steam lines (G6) where steam produced may contact edible products) - NSF Registration No: 165458.

== See also ==
- Boiler feedwater
- Dispersants
- Passivation (chemistry)
