= Dealkalization of water =

Removal of alkalinity ions from water

The dealkalization of water refers to the removal of alkalinity ions from water. Chloride cycle anion ion-exchange dealkalizers remove alkalinity from water.

Chloride cycle dealkalizers operate similar to sodium cycle cation water softeners. Like water softeners, dealkalizers contain ion-exchange resins that are regenerated with a concentrated salt (brine) solution - NaCl. In the case of a water softener, the cation exchange resin is exchanging sodium (the Na^{+} ion of NaCl) for hardness minerals such as calcium and magnesium.

A dealkalizer contains strong base anion exchange resin that exchanges chloride (the Cl^{–} ion of the NaCl) for carbonate (CO^{−}_{3}), bicarbonate (H C O^{−}_{3}) and sulfate (SO^{2−}_{4}). As water passes through the anion resin the carbonate, bicarbonate and sulfate ions are exchanged for chloride ions.

"Higher capacities can be realized by use of type II rather than type I strong base anion resins. Although bicarbonates are not held as tightly as chlorides on the SBA (strong base anion) resins in the hydroxide form, when the resin is predominantly in the chloride form the pH has been raised by a small addition of caustic to the brine regenerant, there will be a favorable exchange of bicarbonate for the chloride. This exchange works well only with high alkalinity waters (40% to 80%), with capacities of 4 to 10 Kg/CF being obtained. The advantages of SBA resin dealkalization is that low-cost salt is used in place of the acid necessary for the SAC (strong acid cation) and un-lined steel tanks can be used."

== Purpose ==
Dealkalizers are most often used as pre-treatment to a boiler and are usually preceded by a water softener. Alkalinity is a factor that most often dictates the amount of boiler blowdown. High alkalinity promotes boiler foaming and carryover and causes high amounts of boiler blowoff. When alkalinity is the limiting factor affecting the amount of blowdown, a dealkalizer will increase the cycles of concentrations and reduce blowdown and operating costs.

The reduction of blowdown by dealkalization keeps the water treatment chemicals in the boiler longer, thus minimizing the amount of chemicals required for efficient, noncorrosive operation.

Carbonate and bicarbonate alkalinities are decomposed by heat in boiler water releasing carbon dioxide into the steam. This gas combines with the condensed steam in process equipment and return lines to form carbonic acid. This depresses the pH value of the condensate returns and results in corrosive attack on the equipment and piping.

In general, a dealkalizer is best applied to boilers operating below 700 psi (48 bar). In order to justify installation of a dealkalizer on low-pressure boilers, the alkalinity content should be above 50 ppm with the amount of make-up water exceeding 1,000 gallons (approx. 4,000 litres) per day.

Cooling system make-up will also benefit from reduced alkalinity. The addition of a dealkalizer to a cooling water system will substantially reduce the amount of acid required to treat the same amount of water.

== Alternate method ==
Hydrogen cycle weak acid cation resins convert alkalinity into carbon dioxide while removing calcium and magnesium. The resin is regenerated with acids at levels close to stoichiometric requirements.

== See also ==
- Outline of water
