= Boiler blowdown =

Wastewater removal of impurities from boilers

Boiler blowdown is water intentionally wasted from a boiler to avoid concentration of impurities during continuing evaporation of steam. The water is blown out of the boiler with some force by steam pressure within the boiler. Bottom blowdown used with early boilers caused abrupt downward adjustment of boiler water level and was customarily expelled downward to avoid the safety hazard of showering hot water on nearby individuals.

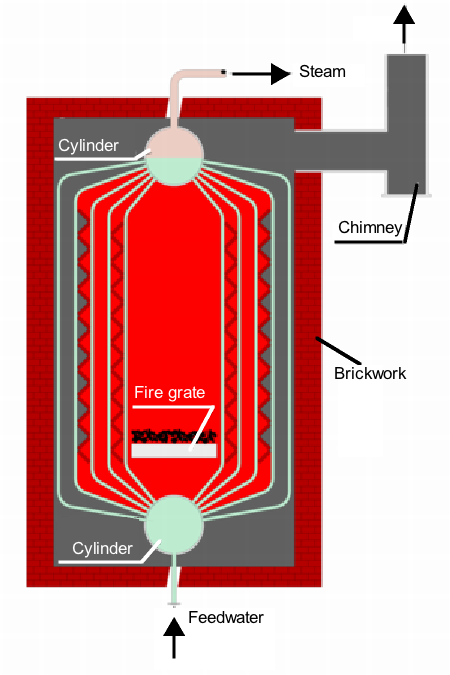
Surface blowdown is removed from the steam drum at the top of the boiler and bottom blowdown is removed from the mud drum at the bottom of the boiler.

== Background ==
A steam boiler evaporates liquid water to form steam, or gaseous water, and requires frequent replenishment of boiler feedwater for the continuous production of steam required by most boiler applications. Water is a capable solvent, and will dissolve small amounts of solids from piping and containers including the boiler. Continuing evaporation of steam concentrates dissolved impurities until they reach levels potentially damaging to steam production within the boiler. Without blowdown, impurities would reach saturation levels and begin to precipitate within the boiler. Impurity concentrations are highest where steam is being produced near heat exchange surfaces. Precipitation would be expected to occur in the form of scale deposits on those heat exchange surfaces. Scale deposits thermally insulate heat exchange surfaces initially decreasing the rate of steam generation, and potentially causing boiler metals to reach failure temperatures.

== Surface blowdown ==
Surface blowdown continuously bleeds off a low volume of water from within the boiler as a means of ridding the boiler of dissolved impurities. It is most effective to remove water with the highest level of impurities; and such water is found where steam separates in the steam drum at the top of the boiler. There are two types of surface blowdown fittings. The simpler is a pipe entering the steam drum at the normal water level. A more sophisticated skimmer arrangement attaches a swivel joint to the pipe for a short length of pipe suspended by a float. The skimmer may be more effective at removing floating oil which might otherwise cause foaming. Surface blowdown is normally fed to a flash tank and heat exchanger for heat recovery. The flashed steam can be used in the feedwater heater. These energy economies are seldom practical with infrequent bottom blowdown. Surface blowdown offers the additional advantage of steady-state operating conditions.

== Bottom blowdown ==
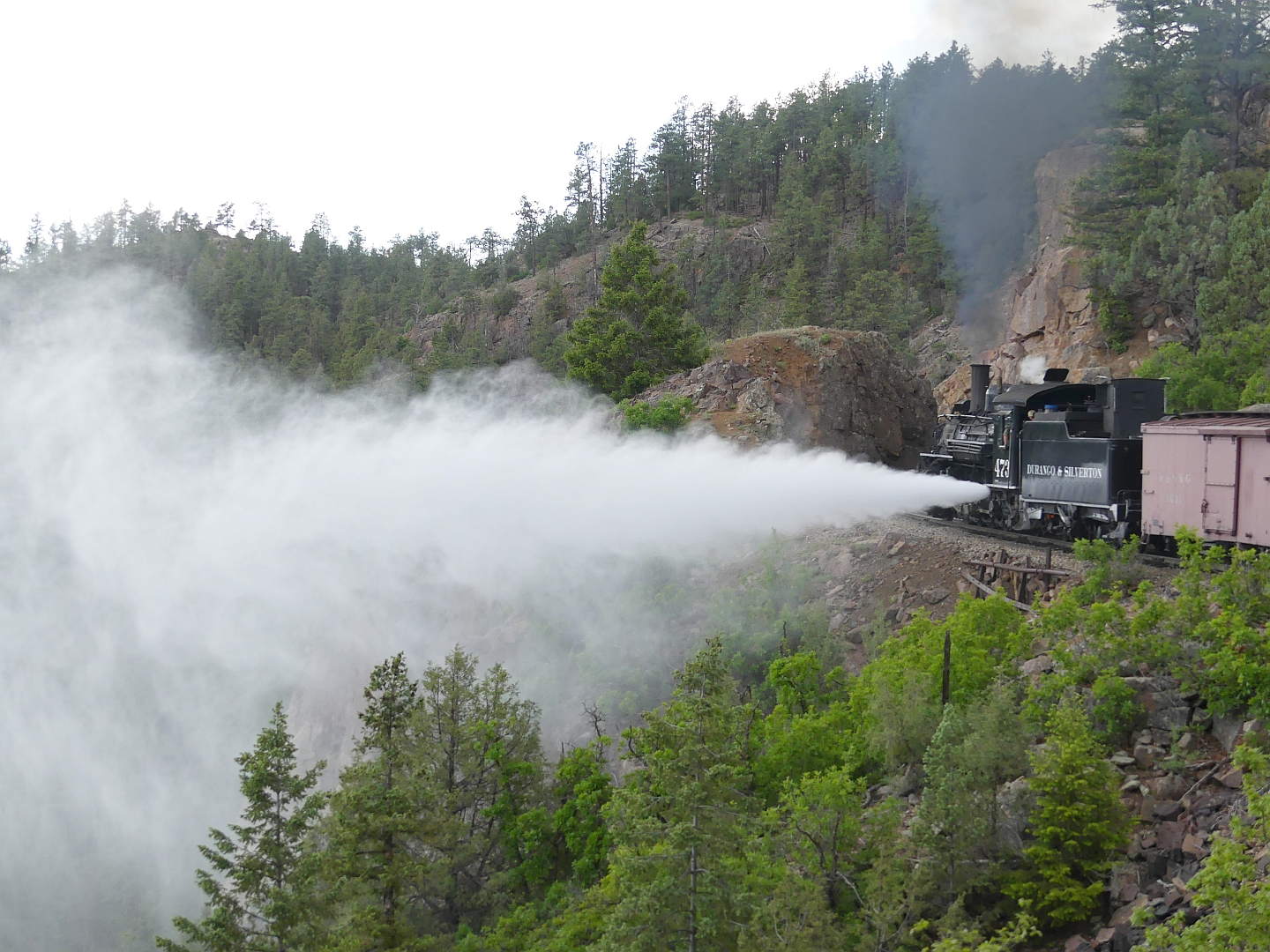
Steam locomotive boiler blowdown.

Some boiler water treatments cause precipitation of impurities as insoluble particles anticipating those particles will settle to the bottom of the boiler before they become entrained in water circulating past the heat exchange surfaces. These water treatments often include compounds forming a sludge to entrap such particles; and boilers intended for such water treatment include a structure called a mud drum at the lowest part of the boiler. Bottom blowdown involves periodically opening valves in the mud drum to allow boiler pressure to force accumulated sludge out of the boiler. Similar blowdown connections at the bottom of water wall headers are blown down less frequently. Several short blowdown events remove sludge more effectively than a single continuous blowdown. Shorter blowdown events cause less significant changes in boiler water level, and are safer during periods of high steam demand.

Bottom blowdown piping drains the lowest parts of the boiler so it can be used to drain the boiler for servicing. Bottom blowdown piping must be of a diameter large enough to minimize the risk of being plugged with baked sludge. Modern boilers discharge bottom blowdown to a blowoff tank where the blowdown can flash and vent steam upwards without entraining water which might cause burns. A pipe near the bottom of the blowoff tank maintains a water level below the blowdown entry point and allows cooler water remaining from earlier blowdown events to drain from the tank first. Two bottom blowdown valves are often used in series to minimize erosion. One valve serves as the sealing valve, and the other as the blowdown valve. The sealing valve is customarily opened first and closed last. Both are opened rapidly and fully to minimize erosion on the seat and disk faces. Care is taken to avoid trapping scale or rust particles within the valve by reopening a valve to flush the particles through if resistance is encountered when attempting to close it. Bottom blowdown valves are often rebuilt or replaced whenever the boiler is taken out of service for maintenance.

== Sources ==
- Betz Laboratories Handbook of Industrial Water Conditioning (7th Edition) Betz Laboratories (1976)
- Kemmer, Frank N. 'The NALCO Water Handbook' McGraw-Hill (1979)
- Perry, Robert H., Chilton, Cecil H. and Kirkpatrick, Sidney D. Chemical Engineers' Handbook (4th Edition) McGraw-Hill (1963)
- Woodruff, Everett B., Lammers, Herbert B. and Lammers, Thomas F. Steam-Plant Operation (5th Edition) McGraw-Hill (1984) ISBN 0-07-071732-X
