= Boiler feedwater pump =

Pump used to feed water into a steam boiler

A boiler feedwater pump is a specific type of pump used to pump feedwater into a steam boiler. The water may be freshly supplied or returning condensate produced as a result of the condensation of the steam produced by the boiler. These pumps are normally high pressure units that take suction from a condensate return system and can be of the centrifugal pump type or positive displacement type.

== Construction and operation ==
Feedwater pumps range in size up to many kilowatts and the electric motor is usually separated from the pump body by some form of mechanical coupling. Large industrial condensate pumps may also serve as the feedwater pump. In either case, to force the water into the boiler, the pump must generate sufficient pressure to overcome the steam pressure developed by the boiler. This is usually accomplished through the use of a centrifugal pump. Another common form of feedwater pump runs constantly and is provided with a minimum flow device to stop overpressuring the pump on low flows. The minimum flow usually returns to the tank or deaerator.

=== Failure of mechanical seal ===
Mechanical seals of boiler feedwater pumps often show signs of electrical corrosion. The relative movement between the sliding ring and the stationary ring provokes static charging which is not diverted due to the very low conductivity of the boiler water (below one micro-Siemens per cm [μS/cm]). Within short periods of operation – in some cases, only a few hundred operational hours – pieces having the size of fingertips break off from the sliding and/or the stationary ring and cause rapid increases in leakage current. Diamond-coated (DLC) mechanical seals avoid this problem and extend durability remarkably.

== Steam-powered pumps ==
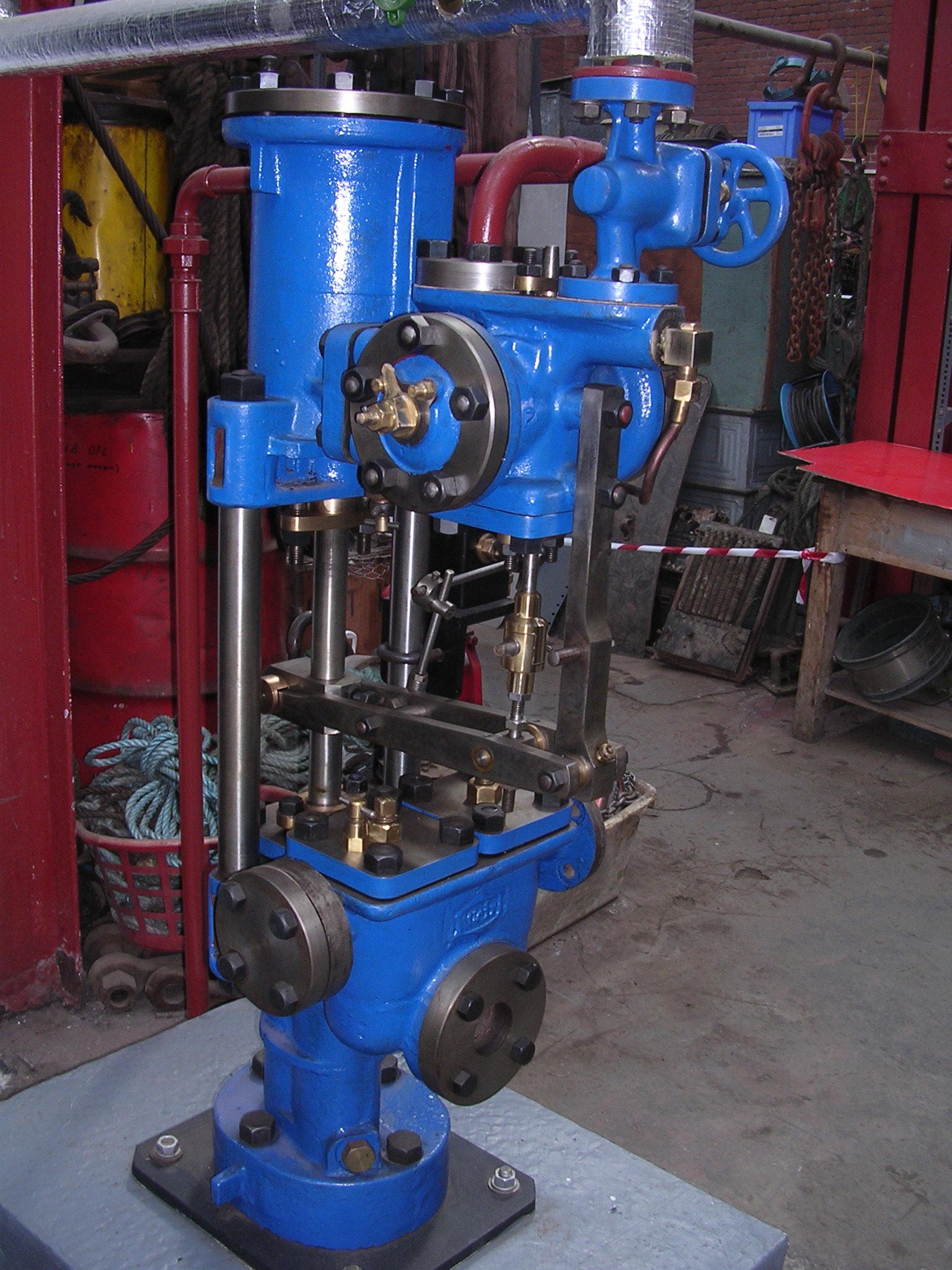
Weir feedwater pump

Steam locomotives and the steam engines used on ships and stationary applications such as power plants also require feedwater pumps. In this situation, though, the pump was often powered using a small steam engine that ran using the steam produced by the boiler. A means had to be provided, of course, to put the initial charge of water into the boiler (before steam power was available to operate the steam-powered feedwater pump). The pump was often a positive displacement pump that had steam valves and cylinders at one end and feedwater cylinders at the other end; no crankshaft was required.

=== Duplex steam pump ===
A duplex steam pump has two sets of steam and water cylinders. They are not physically connected but the steam valves on the first pump are operated by the movement of the second pump's piston rod, and vice versa. The result is that there are no "dead spots" and the pump is always self-starting.

=== Jet injector ===
An injector pump uses the Venturi effect and steam condensation to deliver water to a boiler.

== See also ==
- Boiler feedwater
