= Deaerator =

Device that removes dissolved gases from liquids

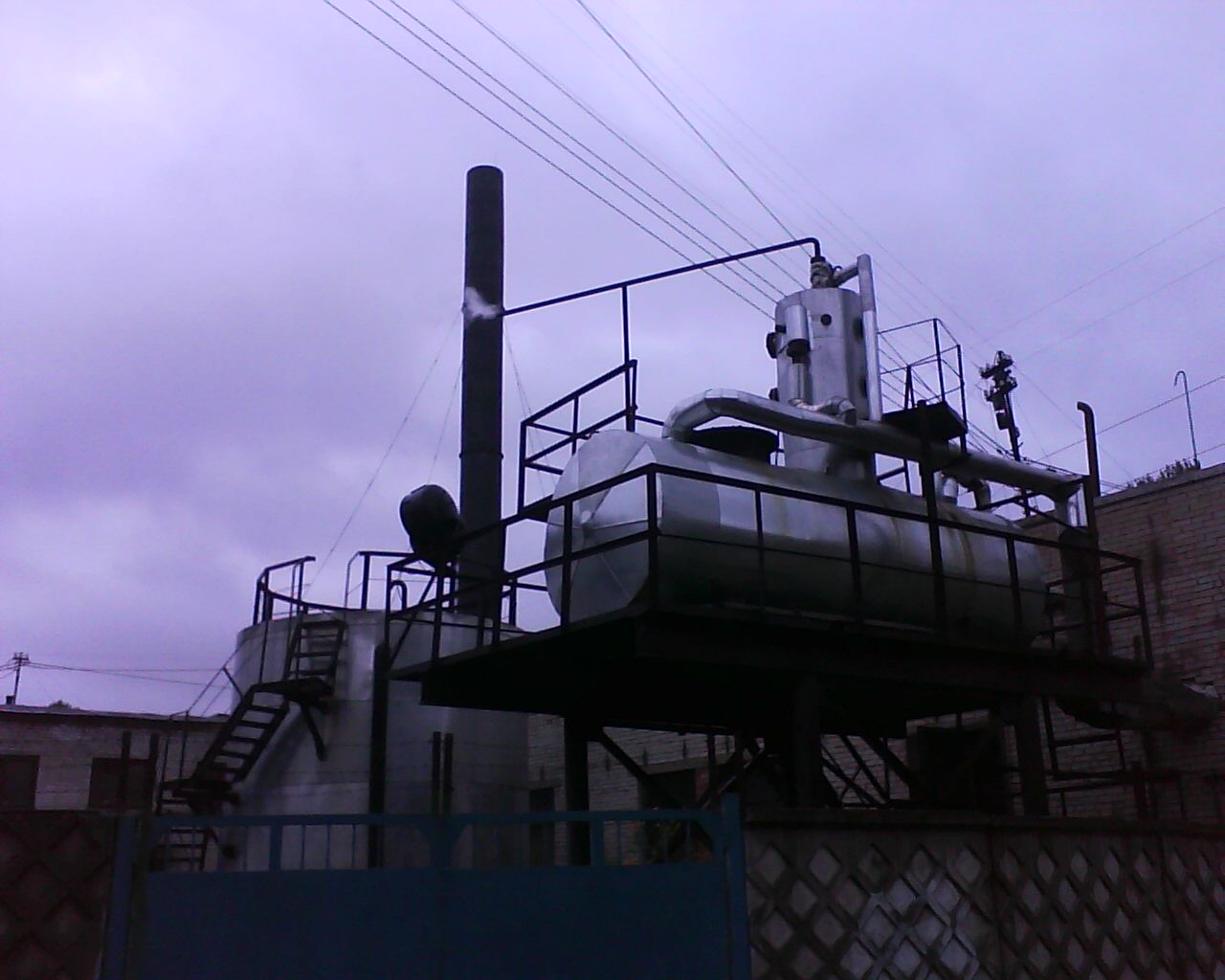
A deaerator plant

A deaerator is a device that is used for the removal of dissolved gases like oxygen from a liquid.

Thermal deaerators are commonly used to remove dissolved gases in feedwater for steam-generating boilers. The deaerator is part of the feedwater heating system. Dissolved oxygen in feedwater will cause serious corrosion damage in a boiler by attaching to the walls of metal piping and other equipment forming oxides (like rust). Dissolved carbon dioxide combines with water to form carbonic acid that may cause further corrosion. Most deaerators are designed to remove oxygen down to levels of 7 parts per billion by weight or less, as well as essentially eliminating carbon dioxide.

Vacuum deaerators are used to remove dissolved gases from products such as food, personal care products, cosmetic products, chemicals, and pharmaceuticals to increase the dosing accuracy in the filling process, to increase product shelf stability, to prevent oxidative effects (e.g. discolouration, changes of smell or taste, rancidity), to alter pH, and to reduce packaging volume.

Manufacturing of deaerators started in the 1800s and continues to the present day.

== History ==
Manufacturing of deaerators started in the 1800s.They were used to purify water used in the ice manufacturing process. Feed water heaters were used for marine applications. In 1899, George M Kleucker received a patent for an improved method of de-aerating water.

Two sister ships, Olympic and Titanic (1912), had contact feed heaters on board. In 1934 the US Navy purchased an atomizing deaerator.

During the 1920s the feedwater heaters and deaerators designs improved.

Between 1921 and 1933, George Gibson, Percy Lyon, and Victor Rohlin of Cochrane received deaerator / degasification patents for bubbling steam through liquid.

1926 Brown Stanley received a patent for reducing oxygen and nitrogen gases (deaeration).

In 1937 Samuel B Applebaum of Permutit received a water deaerator and purifier patent.

Deaerators continue to be used today for many applications.

== Principles ==
Oxygen and Nitrogen are two non-condensable gases that are removed by deaeration. Henry's law describes the relationship of dissolved gases and partial pressures. Thermal deaeration relies on the principle that the solubility of a gas in water decreases as the water temperature increases and approaches its boiling point. In the deaerator, water is heated up to close to its boiling point with a minimum pressure drop and minimum vent. Deaeration is done by spraying feedwater into a chamber to increase its surface area, and may involve flow over multiple layers of trays. This scrubbing (or stripping) steam is fed to the bottom of the deaeration section of the deaerator. When steam contacts the feedwater, it heats it up to its boiling point and dissolved gases are released from the feedwater and vented from the deaerator through the vent. The treated water falls into a storage tank below the deaerator.

Oxygen scavenging chemicals are very often added to the deaerated boiler feedwater to remove any last traces of oxygen that were not removed by the deaerator. The type of chemical added depends on whether the location uses a volatile or non-volatile water treatment program. Most lower pressure systems (lower than 650 psi (4,500 kPa)) use non-volatile treatment programs. The most commonly used oxygen scavenger for lower pressure systems is sodium sulfite (Na_{2}SO_{3}). It is very effective and rapidly reacts with traces of oxygen to form sodium sulfate (Na_{2}SO_{4}) which is non-scaling. Most higher pressure systems (higher than 650 psi (4,500 kPa)) and all systems where certain highly alloyed materials are present are now using volatile programs, as many phosphate-based treatment programs are being phased out. Volatile programs are further broken down into oxidizing or reducing programs [(AVT(O) or AVT(R)] depending whether the environment requires an oxidizing or reducing environment to reduce the incidence of flow-accelerated corrosion. Flow-accelerated corrosion related failures could cause accidents in which significant loss of property and person injury could occur, even though it has not happened historically. Hydrazine (N_{2}H_{4}) is an oxygen scavenger commonly used in volatile treatment programs. Other scavengers include carbohydrazide, diethylhydroxylamine, nitrilotriacetic acid, ethylenediaminetetraacetic acid, and hydroquinone.

== Thermal deaerators ==
Schematic diagram of a typical tray-type deaerator

Schematic diagram of a typical spray-type deaerator

Thermal deaerators are commonly used to remove dissolved gases in feedwater for steam-generating boilers. Dissolved oxygen in feedwater will cause serious corrosion damage in a boiler by attaching to the walls of metal piping and other equipment forming oxides (like rust). Dissolved carbon dioxide combines with water to form carbonic acid that may cause further corrosion. Most deaerators are designed to remove oxygen down to levels of 7 parts per billion by weight or less, as well as essentially eliminating carbon dioxide. The deaerators in the steam generating systems of most thermal power plants use low pressure steam obtained from an extraction point in their steam turbine system. However, the steam generators in many large industrial facilities such as petroleum refineries may use whatever low-pressure steam is available.

=== Tray-type ===
The tray-type deaerator has a vertical domed deaeration section mounted above a horizontal boiler feedwater storage vessel. Boiler feedwater enters the vertical deaeration section through spray valves above the perforated trays and then flows downward through the perforations. Low-pressure deaeration steam enters below the perforated trays and flows upward through the perforations. Combined action of spray valves and trays guarantees very high performance because of longer contact time between steam and water. Some designs use various types of packed beds, rather than perforated trays, to provide good contact and mixing between the steam and the boiler feed water.

The steam strips the dissolved gas from the boiler feedwater and exits via the vent valve at the top of the domed section. If this vent valve has not been opened sufficiently, the deaerator will not work properly, resulting in feed water with a high oxygen content going to the boilers. Should the boiler not have an oxygen-content analyzer, a high level in the boiler chlorides may indicate the vent valve not being far enough open. Some designs may include a vent condenser to trap and recover any water entrained in the vented gas. The vent line usually includes a valve and just enough steam is allowed to escape with the vented gases to provide a small visible telltale plume of steam.

The deaerated water flows down into the horizontal storage vessel from where it is pumped to the steam generating boiler system. Low-pressure heating steam, which enters the horizontal vessel through a Sparge Pipe in the bottom of the vessel, is provided to keep the stored boiler feedwater warm. Stainless steel material is recommended for the sparger pipe. External insulation of the vessel is typically provided to minimize heat loss.

=== Spray-type ===
The typical spray-type deaerator is a horizontal vessel which has a preheating section and a deaeration section. The two sections are separated by a baffle. Low-pressure steam enters the vessel through a sparger in the bottom of the vessel. The boiler feedwater is sprayed into section where it is preheated by the rising steam from the sparger. The purpose of the feedwater spray nozzle and the preheat section is to heat the boiler feedwater to its saturation temperature to facilitate stripping out the dissolved gases in the following deaeration section. The preheated feedwater then flows into the deaeration section (F), where it is deaerated by the steam rising from the sparger system. The gases stripped out of the water exit via the vent at the top of the vessel. Again, some designs may include a vent condenser to trap and recover any water entrained in the vented gas. Also again, the vent line usually includes a valve and just enough steam is allowed to escape with the vented gases to provide a small and visible telltale plume of steam. The deaerated boiler feedwater is pumped from the bottom of the vessel to the steam generating boiler system. Silencers (optional) have been used for reducing venting noise levels in the Deaerator equipment industry.

== Vacuum deaerators ==
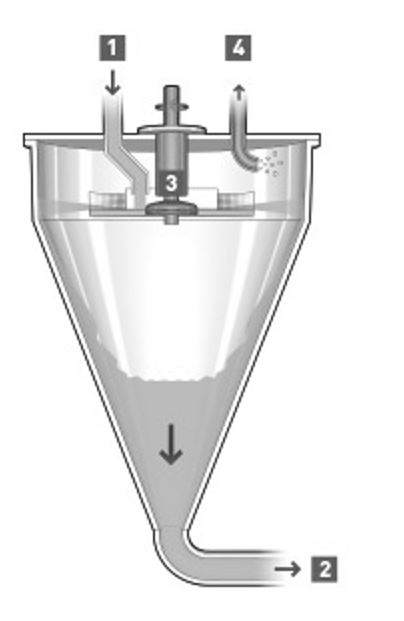
Schematic diagram of rotating disc deaerator

Deaerators are also used to remove dissolved gases from products such as food, personal care products, cosmetic products, chemicals, and pharmaceuticals to increase the dosing accuracy in the filling process, to increase product shelf stability, to prevent oxidative effects (e.g. discolouration, changes of smell or taste, rancidity), to alter pH, and to reduce packaging volume. Vacuum deaerators are also used in the petrochemical field.

In 1921 a tank with vacuum pump for removing gases was used in Pittsburgh. In 1934 and 1940 a tank with vacuum pump for removing gases were used in Indiana.

Vacuum deaerators can be rubber lined on the inside to protect the steel heads and shell from corrosion.

=== Rotating Disc ===
In a typical design, the product is distributed as a thin layer on a high speed spinning disc via special feed system. The centrifugal force slings it through a perforated screen onto the inner wall of the vessel, which is under vacuum. Air (gas) pockets are released in the process and are drawn off by the vacuum. A discharge pump carries the deaerated product to the next process in the production line. For high viscous products the rotating disc is replaced with static one.

== Other types ==
Sound waves using ultrasonic equipment can be used to assist deaerating water.

== Production ==
Welding of the steel pressure vessels during the manufacturing process sometimes requires Post weld heat treatment, XRAY, Dye Penetration, Ultrasonic, and other type non-destructive testing. ASME Boiler and Pressure Vessel Code, NACE International, and HEI (Heat Exchange Institute) have recommendations on the type of testing required. Older fabrication techniques also used cast iron for the shell and heads.

Thermal insulation is sometimes required after fabrication or after installation at the project site. Insulation is used to reduce heat loses.

== Inspection and maintenance ==
NACE International (now known as Association for Materials Protection and Performance (AMPP)) and CIBO (Council of Industrial Boiler Owners) have several recommendations to increase the life of the deaerator unit. First, regular inspections (and testing) of the pressure vessel for cracking of welds, and repairing of any weld defects. Second, maintaining a proper water chemistry to reduce deaerator deterioration. Third, minimize temperature and pressure fluctuation. Fourth, internals and accessories should be inspected for proper operation. NACE had created a Corrosion Task Group in 1984 that studied causes of corrosion and provided recommendations; NACE still provides recommendations to improve operations of the equipment.

== Manufacturers ==
Stork (now Bilfinger) started building deaerators in 1839 and are still producing their spray-type deaerators with unique and efficient sprayers. Stickle, Cochrane, and Permutit are three of the oldest Deaerator manufacturers in the USA. In 1929, a court case between Elliott Company (no longer in business) and H.S.B.W. Cochrane Corporation allowed both businesses to continue manufacturing deaerators.

In 1909 Weir was manufacturing contact feed heaters (for de-aerating) in Europe.

By 1937 Permutit was manufacturing deaerators.

In 1939, Cochrane, Darby, Elliott, Groeschel, Stearns-Rogers, Worthington, and others were competing against each other for business. In 1949 Chicago Heater was formed and became a leading deaerator manufacturer. In 1954, Allis-Chalmers, Chicago Heater, Cochrane, Elliott, Graver, Swartwout, Worthington, and others were in business.

== Applications ==
Deaerators are used in many industries such as co-generation plants, hospitals, larger laundry facilities, oil fields, oil refineries, off-shore platforms, paper mills, power plants, prisons, steel mills, and many other industries.

== See also ==
- Defoamer – Chemical additive that reduces and hinders the formation of foam in liquids
- Degasification – Removal of dissolved gases from liquids

== Sources ==
- Babcock & Wilcox Co. (2005). Steam: Its Generation and Use (41st ed.). ISBN 0-9634570-0-4.
- Elliott, Thomas C.; Chen, Kao; Swanekamp, Robert (1998). Standard Handbook of Powerplant Engineering (2nd ed.). McGraw-Hill. ISBN 978-0-07-019435-9.
- Kent, Robert Thurston, ed. (1936). Kents' Mechanical Engineers' Handbook in two volumes (11th ed.). John Wiley & Sons.
