= Listed buildings in Matlock Town =

Matlock Town is a civil parish in the Derbyshire Dales district of Derbyshire, England. The parish contains 44 listed buildings that are recorded in the National Heritage List for England. Of these, six are listed at Grade II*, the middle of the three grades, and the others are at Grade II, the lowest grade. The parish contains the town of Matlock and the surrounding area. Most of the listed buildings are houses, cottages and associated structures, farmhouses and farm buildings. During the middle of the 19th century, Matlock became a centre for hydrotherapy, and buildings known as hydros were built for this purpose. Two of the larger hydros have survived and are listed. The other listed buildings include churches, a chapel, items in a churchyard, public houses, bridges, a former malthouse, a bank, a milestone, a former smithy, and a war memorial.

== Key ==
Grade	Criteria
II*	Particularly important buildings of more than special interest
II	Buildings of national importance and special interest

== Buildings ==
Name and location	Photograph	Date	Notes	Grade
St Giles' Church; 53.13427°N 1.55180°W		Medieval	The church has been altered and extended through the centuries, the chancel was rebuilt in 1859, the nave in 1871, and the Lady chapel was added in 1898. The church is built in gritstone with freestone dressings and has a slate roof. It consists of a nave with a clerestory, north and south aisles, a south porch, a chancel with a south chapel and a north vestry, and a west tower. The tower has three stages, diagonal buttresses, and a west doorway with a moulded surround, over which is a three-light Perpendicular window. In the middle stage are clock faces, and the top stage has two-light bell openings, over which is an embattled parapet and crocketed corner pinnacles. The south aisle also has an embattled parapet.	II*
Matlock Bridge; 53.13791°N 1.55628°W		15th century	The bridge carries Snitterton Road over the River Derwent, and was widened in 1904. It is in stone, and consists of four pointed arches. The bridge has massive cutwaters, and on the north side are V-shaped recesses.	II*
Riber Hall; 53.12710°N 1.54011°W		Early 17th century	The southwest wing was added to the house in 1661, producing a U-shaped plan, and it has since been divided. The house is in stone with moulded cornices, a roof of tile with some later slates, and gables with ball finials. There are two storeys and attics, and the doorway is square-headed with a chamfered surround. The windows are mullioned and ransomed, and there are two gabled dormers with mullioned windows.	II*
Manor House; 53.12816°N 1.53872°W		1633	The house is in stone, and has a roof partly tiled and partly slated, with coped gables and ball finials. There are two storeys and attics, a hall range, and a gabled cross-wing on the right. The doorway has a square head and a chamfered surround. The windows in the hall range are mullioned, and in the cross-wing they are mullioned and transomed with hood moulds. On the cross-wing is a dated and initialled panel, and in the angle at the rear is a three-storey stair tower.	II*
Wolds Farmhouse; 53.14596°N 1.54710°W	—	1634	The farmhouse, which was extended in the 18th century, is in stone, and has a stone tile roof with coped gables. There are two storeys and three bays. The older part has quoins and mullioned windows with hood moulds. The later part has bands, and a doorway with a frieze, a central panel that continues as an architrave, and a moulded hood.	II
3 Knowleston Place; 53.13513°N 1.55141°W	—	17th century	A stone house with the gable end facing the road. There are two storeys, it contains a doorway and a sash window, both with plain surrounds, and a re-set plaque with initials and the date 1621.	II
Outbuildings, Dimple Farm; 53.14361°N 1.56304°W	—	Mid 17th century	The outbuildings form two ranges at right angles, and have since been used for other purposes. They are in gritstone with roofs of Welsh slate, stone slate and blue tile, the earlier gables coped. The earlier range has three bays, and contains a central full-height doorway and a taking-in door. The later range has five bays and has a double doorway and a lean-to.	II
Barn of Riber Hall; 53.12734°N 1.53994°W		17th century	The barn, later used for other purposes, is in stone, with a slate roof and coped gables. There is a single storey and a long range. The barn contains doorways with chamfered surrounds, and windows with plain surrounds.	II
Garden wall and gate piers, Riber Hall; 53.12701°N 1.54004°W		1661 (probable)	Along the front of the garden is a stone wall with a balustrade. Semicircular steps lead up to the entrance, which is flanked by engraved gate piers with ball finials.	II
Wellfield Cottage; 53.14350°N 1.54802°W	—	1667	A stone cottage with two storeys. The main range has a roof of slate, and the wing has a stone slate roof with a coped gable. The doorway has a square head and an inscribed and dated lintel. There are single-light windows and three-light mullioned windows, all with chamfered surrounds.	II
86–92 Church Street; 53.13395°N 1.55107°W		Late 17th century	A house that was extended and converted into four houses in 1927, it is in stone and has coped gables with ball finials. There are two storeys and an attic, and five bays, the middle bay taller and gabled. In the left return are original single-light windows and a three-light mullioned window.	II
Dimple Farmhouse; 53.14345°N 1.56238°W	—	Late 17th century	The farmhouse is in stone on a plinth, with sprocketed eaves, and a tile roof with coped gables. There are two storeys and an L-shaped plan, consisting of a range of three bays, and a projecting gabled wing on the right. The doorway has a chamfered surround, and the windows are mullioned.	II
Former King's Head Inn; 53.13369°N 1.55188°W		Late 17th century	The former inn is in stone with quoins and a tile roof. There are two storeys, and, facing the road, are two gables, the right gable larger. The building has two two-light mullioned windows containing sashes, one with a hood mould, and a doorway with pilasters.	II
Wheatsheaf Farmhouse; 53.13373°N 1.55272°W		1681	A stone house that has an M-shaped tile roof with coped gables. On the right is a recessed doorway with a dated panel, the windows on the front are cross windows, and on the sides and at the rear they are mullioned.	II*
11 Dimple Road; 53.14088°N 1.55966°W	—	Early 18th century (probable)	A stone house with quoins, and a slate roof with coped gables and kneelers. There are two storeys and an attic, two bays, and a single-storey rear wing. The doorway has a plain surround, the windows are sashes, and in the attic is a wheel window.	II
Duke William Inn; 53.13335°N 1.55230°W		1734	The public house is in stone with false quoins, sill bands, and a slate roof with coped gables and kneelers. There are three storeys and five bays. The central doorway has an architrave and a hood on consoles, and the windows have heavy surrounds.	II
The Dene; 53.12630°N 1.53811°W	—	Early to mid 18th century	A house to which a byre was added in the late 19th century, and subsequently converted for residential use. It is in gritstone and has roofs of stone slabs and Staffordshire blue tile. There are two storeys, the house has three bays, and the former byre has a single bay. Both parts contain mullioned windows and casements.	II
Matlock Mill; 53.13553°N 1.54009°W		Mid 18th century	The former water-powered corn mill is in stone and has slate roofs. There are four storeys, a central gabled block with three bays, and flanking three-bay wings. The central doorway has an arched head and a segmental fanlight, and in the wings are hoist enclosures.	II
Former Malt House, Matlock Mill; 53.13593°N 1.53965°W		Mid 18th century	The former malthouse is in stone with moulded eaves, and a slate roof with coped gables and kneelers. The openings include a sash window.	II
St Andrew's House; 53.13553°N 1.54072°W		Mid 18th century	The house is in stone with quoins, moulded eaves, and a slate roof with parapeted gables and kneelers. There are three storeys and attics, and five bays. The central doorway has a quoined and moulded surround, pilasters, an entablature, and a cornice. The windows are sashes in moulded architraves, the window above the doorway has a cornice hood, and there are four box dormers.	II
Sundial, St Giles' Church; 53.13416°N 1.55205°W		18th century	The sundial in the churchyard probably incorporates a medieval shaft and base. It stands on three circular steps.	II
Wall and gateway, St Giles' Church; 53.13385°N 1.55155°W		18th century	The walls enclosing the churchyard are in stone with rounded coping. At the entrance to the churchyard is a lychgate dating from 1908, flanked by stone piers with ball finials.	II
The Rectory; 53.13333°N 1.55324°W		18th century	The rectory is in stone with a tile roof, and has an L-shaped plan. The main block has three storeys, two bays and a hipped roof, and it contains a doorway with an architrave, and a hood on consoles. The wing has two storeys, a coped gable with kneelers, a sash window, and Venetian windows.	II
5 Knowleston Place; 53.13509°N 1.55131°W		1753	An additional bay was added to the left of the house in 1772. It is in stone with quoins, a sill band in the added bay, and a slate roof. There are three storeys and three bays, and a recessed doorway with a cornice hood. This is flanked by square bay windows with ball finials, and the other windows are sashes, those in the original part with two lights and mullions. There are dated plaques on the original part and on the added bay.	II
Bank House; 53.13776°N 1.55737°W		Late 18th century	The bank is in stone with pilasters, moulded eaves, and a tile roof. There are two storeys, a main block of five bays, an added single-storey single-bay wing on the left, and later additions at the rear. In the centre of the main block, quadrant-shaped steps with a wall on the right lead up to a doorway with a moulded architrave and a segmental pediment on consoles. The windows are sashes in plain architraves. The left wing is decorative, with paired half-round Doric pilasters, and a blocking course with voluted acroteria surmounted by two urns. At the rear is a wing with a Venetian window.	II
Huntbridge House; 53.13390°N 1.54517°W	—	Late 18th century	A stone house with slate roofs and a coped gable on the left, consisting of two wings at right angles. The west wing has three storeys and three bays, and has quoins, a floor band, and a moulded cornice. It contains a doorway with fluted pilasters, a moulded surround, a segmental fanlight, and an open pediment, and the windows are sashes in architraves. On its right is a single-storey three-bay extension. The east wing has two storeys, two two-light mullioned windows and one sash window, and a later extension with a rustic cornice porch, and a doorway with a moulded surround.	II
Sitch Farmhouse; 53.12198°N 1.55053°W	—	Late 18th century	A house, stable and former cottage in rendered gritstone with a Welsh slate roof. There are two storeys, with the two-bay house in the centre, the cottage on the left, and the stable on the right. In the house and cottage are mullioned windows, and the stable has a doorway and a square window. On the right is a lean-to kennel and external steps, and at the rear is a single-bay scullery and dairy.	II
Allenhill Spa Well; 53.14030°N 1.55873°W	—	1821 (restored)	A small stone structure with a pediment surrounding a disused mineral spring. It is inscribed with its name and the date of its restoration.	II
15 Knowleston Place; 53.13484°N 1.55082°W		Early 19th century	A stone house with a floor band, moulded eaves, and a hipped slate roof. There are two storeys and a symmetrical front of three bays. Steps lead up to the central doorway that has a plain surround and a rectangular fanlight, and the windows are sashes with plain surrounds.	II
Former Boathouse Inn; 53.13455°N 1.55719°W		Early 19th century	The public house, later used for other purposes, is stuccoed and has a tile roof. There are two storeys and three bays, and a recessed stone wing on the left with two storeys and two bays. The building contains a doorway with a moulded surround, and sash windows.	II
Milestone; 53.14046°N 1.56045°W		Early 19th century	The milestone is on the south side of Bakewell Road (A615 road). It has a triangular plan, and the angled faces are inscribed with the distances to London, Bakewell, and Matlock.	II
Smithy; 53.14080°N 1.53414°W		Early to mid 19th century	The former smithy is in gritstone and has a stone slate roof. There is a single storey and a square plan. The doorway has a quoined surround, a timber lintel, and a keystone lintel, and there is a single two-light mullioned window. Attached to the smithy is a wall, and there are two associated wells.	II
Swiss Cottages; 53.13412°N 1.54716°W	—	1839	A pair of stone houses designed by Joseph Paxton with false quoins, bold eaves, and a slate roof. There are two storeys and a central gabled bay containing three round-arched windows. This is flanked by open porches with rusticated surrounds, round-arched heads, and keystones. At the sides are recessed wings containing round-arched windows with wheel fanlights.	II
Bridge House; 53.13398°N 1.54741°W	—	c. 1850	A stone building with a slate roof and two storeys. On the east side are two doorways, one with a square head, and the other with a segmental head and a dated keystone, and the west side contains two casement windows. In the gable end facing the street is a round-headed window, and the rear gable end has external steps leading to an upper floor doorway.	II
Footbridge; 53.13405°N 1.54733°W	—	c. 1850 or earlier	The footbridge, which crosses a stream, is in stone. It consists of a single segmental arch with plain parapets.	II
Former Stationmasters House, Matlock railway station 53.13817°N 1.55779°W		c. 1850	The house was built by the Manchester, Buxton, Matlock and Midland Junction Railway, it is in gritstone, and has an oversailing Welsh slate roof. There are two storeys and an L-shaped plan, with a south front of three bays, extensions at the rear, and an enclosed courtyard. On the front is a hipped lean-to roof on a square column enclosing a doorway with a rectangular fanlight, and the windows are sashes, some with arched heads.	II
7–13 Knowleston Place; 53.13498°N 1.55106°W		1857	A terrace of four houses in Georgian style with Gothic features. It is in stone with quoins, floor bands, a moulded cornice at the eaves with drop finials, and a slate roof with three gables and ornamental bargeboards. There are three storeys and nine bays. The four doorways have arched fanlights, there are three canted bay windows with moulded cornices, and nine sash windows, five with moulded cornices and four with hood moulds.	II
Rockside Hall; 53.14459°N 1.54981°W		1862	Built as a hydro to provide treatment with hydrotherapy, a large extension by Parker and Unwin was added in Art Nouveau style in 1903–06, and it was later extended further and used for other purposes. It is in stone with red brick dressings, partly rendered, and has a tile roof. The original block has three storeys and seven bays, coped gables and kneelers, and mainly sash windows. The extension has five storeys and attics and seven bays, and has buttresses rising to chimneys and casement windows. On the south front are octagonal corner turrets with hipped roofs and octagonal cupolas.	II
Riber Castle; 53.12787°N 1.54308°W		1862–68	A country house in a prominent position, built and designed by John Smedley for his own use. It is in the form of a mock castle, it has since been used for various purposes, and from 2009 has been converted into flats. It is in millstone grit, and consists of four three-storey embattled corner towers, linked by two-storey curtain walls with intermediate turrets, all embattled.	II
Former Smedley's Hydro; 53.14259°N 1.55169°W		1867	The original building was provided by John Smedley as a hydro to provide treatment with hydrotherapy. Numerous additions were made subsequently, and from 1955 it was converted into the County Hall for Derbyshire. The original part is in stone with sill bands, embattled parapets, four storeys and eleven bays. In 1885–58 part of the building was replaced by an extension including a tower with a mansard roof, iron cresting, and a corona, and in 1900–01 the Winter Gardens were added, which included a glass dome and a colonnade.	II
All Saints' Church; 53.14383°N 1.55527°W		1883–84	Alterations were made to the west end of the church in 1958–59. It is built in gritstone with freestone dressings and a slate roof, and is in Early English style. The church consists of a nave with a clerestory, north and south aisles, a chancel with a clerestory, a south chapel, and a north organ chamber and vestry. At the west end is a polygonal apse, and on the south side of the chancel is a bracketed bellcote.	II
St John the Baptist's Chapel and walls 53.13113°N 1.56168°W		1897	A private chapel built into a cliff and designed by Guy Dawber, it is in carboniferous limestone with gritstone dressings and a roof of stone slate and tile. It consists of a single cell, and has a square bell turret with a pyramidal lead roof at the south. On the west front is a doorway with a pointed arch and a moulded surround, and a gabled porch that continues as a lean-to covered walk. Also on the west front are mullioned windows, a keyhole lancet window, and an oriel window. The chapel stands on a massive retaining wall, extending to form boundary walls, one containing a stone water trough.	II*
Tor Cottage; 53.14531°N 1.55319°W	—	1903–04	A pair of cottages designed by Parker and Unwin, in stone with tile roofs. There are two storeys and four bays. In the centre of the garden front are two three-light mullioned windows, flanked by two-storey canted bay windows with mullions and transoms. In the centre of the upper floor is a pair of cross windows.	II
Pic Tor War Memorial; 53.13432°N 1.55516°W		1921	The war memorial on Pic Tor, a limestone outcrop overlooking the town, consists of a stone Celtic cross with a tapering shaft on a stepped gritstone base. On the base of the plinth are brass plaques with inscriptions and the names of those lost in the two World Wars.	II
