= Christ Church, Holloway =

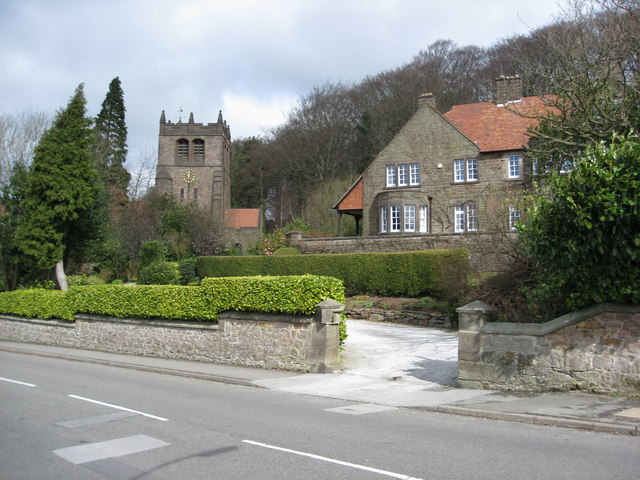

- Location within Derbyshire
- 53°06′32″N 1°31′8″W
- Location: Holloway, Derbyshire
- Country: England
- Denomination: Church of England

History
- Dedication: St John the Baptist

Architecture
- Heritage designation: Grade II* listed
- Architect: Percy Heylyn Currey
- Groundbreaking: 2 November 1901
- Completed: 21 February 1903
- Construction cost: £4,500 (equivalent to £473,100 in 2025).

Administration
- Province: Canterbury
- Diocese: Derby
- Archdeaconry: Chesterfield
- Deanery: Wirksworth
- Parish: Holloway

Christ Church, Holloway is a Grade II* listed parish church in the Church of England in Holloway, Derbyshire.

== History ==
The foundation stone was laid by Victor Cavendish, MP for West Derbyshire, on 2 November 1901 in the presence of the Bishop of Derby. The architect was Percy Heylyn Currey of Derby and the contractor was W. Wildgoose of Matlock.

The church was dedicated on 21 February 1903 by the Rt. Revd. George Ridding, Bishop of Southwell.

The tower was completed in 1911 in memory of William Walker of Holloway and dedicated on 11 November 1911.

== Parish status ==
The church is in a joint parish with

- St Giles' Church, Matlock
- St John the Baptist's Church, Dethick
- St John the Baptist's Chapel, Matlock Bath

== Organ ==
The pipe organ was installed in 1903 by Andrews of Bradford. The first recital on it was given by Gordon L. Salt, grandson of Sir Titus Salt, on 28 June 1903. It was enlarged in 1966 by Groves of Nottingham A specification of the organ can be found on the National Pipe Organ Register.
