= Riber =

Hamlet in Derbyshire, England

Coordinates: 53.122°N 1.535°W

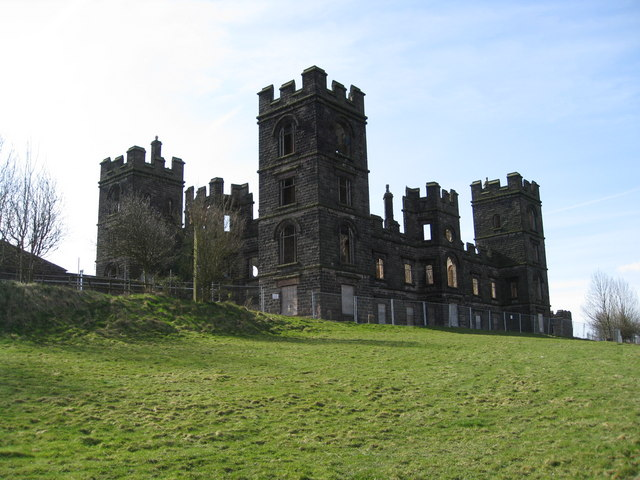
- Riber Castle

- Location within Derbyshire
- Population: 56
- OS grid reference: SK312584
- Civil parish: Matlock Town
- District: Derbyshire Dales
- Shire county: Derbyshire
- Region: East Midlands
- Country: England
- Sovereign state: United Kingdom
- Post town: MATLOCK
- Postcode district: DE4
- Dialling code: 01629
- Police: Derbyshire
- Fire: Derbyshire
- Ambulance: East Midlands

Riber is a hamlet in the civil parish of Matlock Town, in the Derbyshire Dales district, in the county of Derbyshire, England. It is situated high on a hill overlooking the town and also Matlock Bath, near to the residential Starkholmes area.

Riber is famous for its castle, the dilapidated shell of a Victorian folly built in a semi-classic, semi-Gothic style by the wealthy local industrialist John Smedley, which is currently in the process of being converted into flats with 20 new houses to be built in the grounds. From the 1960s to September 2000 the castle grounds hosted a wildlife park which closed due to financial loss and criticisms of the way many of the animals were kept.

Nearby is the old, possibly-Elizabethan Riber Hall and Manor House, a Grade II* listed building and farm with cottages. The hall was previously run as a hotel and restaurant; as of 2014 it is a private residence offering self-catering accommodation in converted outbuildings.

Riber can be accessed from the A615 at Tansley, a village just outside Matlock via the gentle slope of Alders Lane and Carr Lane. From the Matlock Green area of Matlock via Starkholmes Road or from Cromford on the A6 road via Willersley Lane then taking White Tor Road and Riber Road – the approaches all involve extremely steep roads and winding lanes.

Riber also gives its name to the Beast of Riber, also reported in local press as "The Beast of Lumsdale" – possibly a phantom cat which has been sighted on occasion.
