= Pic Tor War Memorial =

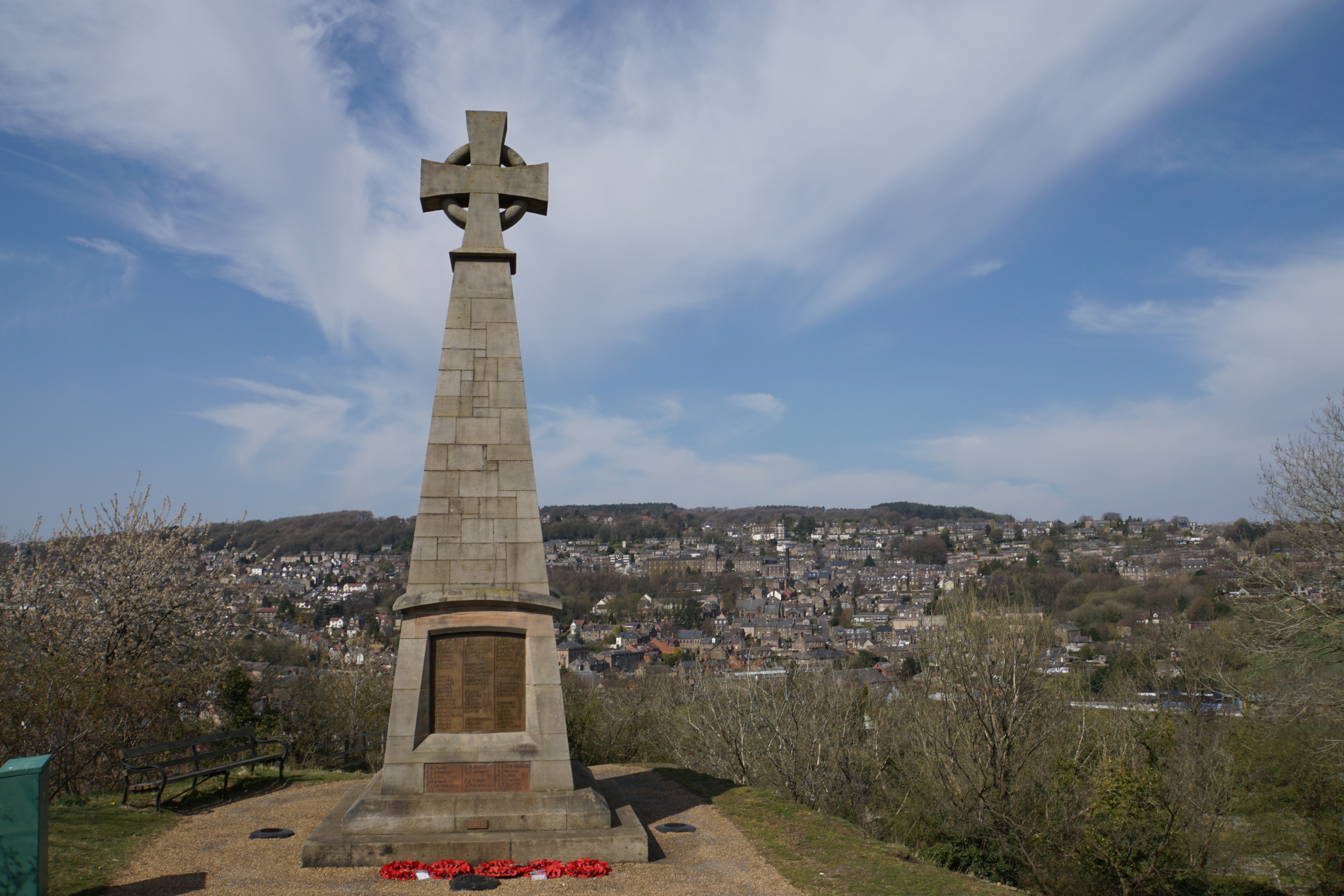
- Pic Tor War Memorial

- Location in Derbyshire
- 53°08′04″N 1°33′18″W
- Location: Matlock, Derbyshire, England

Listed Building – Grade II
- Official name: War Memorial
- Designated: 9 August 2006
- Reference no.: 1391740

Pic Tor War Memorial is a 20th-century grade II listed war memorial in Matlock, Derbyshire.

== History ==
The memorial stands on a limestone outcrop known as Pic Tor, near the churchyard of St Giles' Church. It is dedicated to the inhabitants of the town that died during both World Wars.

The memorial has been Grade II listed since 9 August 2006.

== See also ==
- Listed buildings in Matlock Town
