= Listed buildings in Plumtree, Nottinghamshire =

Plumtree is a civil parish in the Rushcliffe district of Nottinghamshire, England. The parish contains seven listed buildings that are recorded in the National Heritage List for England. Of these, one is listed at Grade I, the highest of the three grades, and the others are at Grade II, the lowest grade. The parish contains the village of Plumtree and the surrounding area. All the listed buildings are in the village, and consist of a church, two farmhouses, a former rectory and associated structures, and a war memorial in the churchyard.

== Key ==
Grade	Criteria
I	Buildings of exceptional interest, sometimes considered to be internationally important
II	Buildings of national importance and special interest

== Buildings ==
Name and location	Photograph	Date	Notes	Grade
Church of St Mary the Virgin; 52.89186°N 1.08722°W		11th century	The church has been altered and extended through the centuries, including a restoration in 1873–74 by Bodley and Garner, and rebuilding of the tower in 1905 by P. H. Currey. It is built in stone with roofs of lead and slate, and consists of a nave with a clerestory, north and south aisles, a south porch, a chancel, a north vestry and organ chamber, and a west tower. The tower has buttresses, a chamfered plinth, and a west doorway with a chamfered arch, above which is a two-light window, a clock face, and bell openings with two lights. The tower, the nave and the chancel have embattled parapets.	I
Hall Farmhouse; 52.89240°N 1.08747°W		Early 17th century	The farmhouse is in red brick and stone, with dentilled eaves, and a tile roof with brick coped gables and kneelers. There are two storeys and attics, and a lower two-storey two-bay brick wing on the right. The doorway has a fanlight, and the windows are a mix of sashes and casements, those in the ground floor with segmental heads. At the rear is a four-light mullioned window and a four-light cross-casement window, both with hood moulds.	II
The Old Rectory; 52.89152°N 1.08741°W		c. 1800	The rectory, later a private house, was extended later in the 19th century. It is in rendered brick with slate roofs. The original block has a plinth, and a parapet with a cornice. There are two storeys and five bays, the middle three bays projecting under a pediment. The central doorway has an eared architrave, a fanlight, and flanking paired Ionic pilasters rising to the pediment, and the windows are sashes. Recessed on the left is the later extension with two storeys, five bays, bracketed eaves and a hipped roof. On the front is a canted bay window and a stair window.	II
Manor Farmhouse; 52.89248°N 1.08995°W		Early 19th century	The farmhouse is in red brick with dentilled eaves and a tile roof. There are three storeys, three bays, and two-storey wings at the rear. The central doorway has a fanlight, it is flanked by cross-casement windows, and the windows in the upper floors are sashes, those in the middle floor with segmental heads. In the top floor is a stone lozenge-shaped plaque.	II
Gateway and wall, The Old Rectory; 52.89175°N 1.08781°W		Early 19th century	At the entrance to the grounds are wooden gates flanked by brick gate piers with chamfered corners and stone caps. Outside these are brick walls on stone plinths, curving and ending in similar piers. In the right wall is a smaller gateway.	II
Stable block and attached wall and gateway, The Old Rectory; 52.89166°N 1.08814°W		Early 19th century	The stable block is in rendered red brick on a stone plinth, with stone dressings and a hipped slate roof. There are two storeys and ten bays. The block contains three arched doorways, domestic doorways with stone surrounds, and round-arched casement windows with Gothick glazing bars. To the right is a stepped brick wall with stone coping containing a large carriage entrance.	II
War memorial 52.89188°N 1.08764°W		1921	The war memorial is in the churchyard of the Church of St Mary the Virgin, and is in granite. It consists of a Celtic cross on a rhomboid plinth on a base of three steps. On the front is a carving of the sword of sacrifice in relief. On the east and north faces of the plinth are inscriptions and the names of those lost in the two World Wars.	II
