= St John the Baptist's Church, Dethick =

St John the Baptist’s Church, Dethick
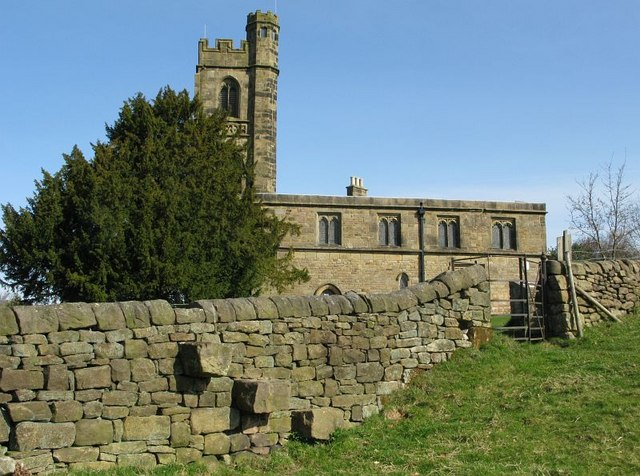
- St John the Baptist’s Church, Dethick

- Location within Derbyshire
- 53°07′2.22″N 1°30′46.38″W
- Location: Dethick, Derbyshire
- Country: England
- Denomination: Church of England

History
- Dedication: St John the Baptist

Architecture
- Heritage designation: Grade II* listed

Administration
- Province: Canterbury
- Diocese: Derby
- Archdeaconry: Chesterfield
- Deanery: Wirksworth
- Parish: Dethick

St John the Baptist's Church, Dethick is a Grade II* listed parish church in the Church of England in Dethick, Derbyshire.

== History ==
The church was founded in 1279 by Geoffrey Dethick, and Thomas de Wathenowe, the Prior of Felley Priory in Nottinghamshire as a private chapel to Dethick Manor.

It is all of this early date with the exception of the tower which was added by Sir Antony Babington, between 1530 as noted on a date stone over the west door, and 1532, as noted on the richly decorated band of the tower.

== Parish status ==
The church is in a joint parish with

- St Giles' Church, Matlock
- Christ Church, Holloway
- St John the Baptist's Chapel, Matlock Bath

== Organ ==
The pipe organ is a Positive Organ Company instrument. A specification of the organ can be found on the National Pipe Organ Register.

== See also ==
- Grade II* listed buildings in Amber Valley
- Listed buildings in Dethick, Lea and Holloway
