= St Osmund's Church, Derby =

St Osmund’s Church, Derby
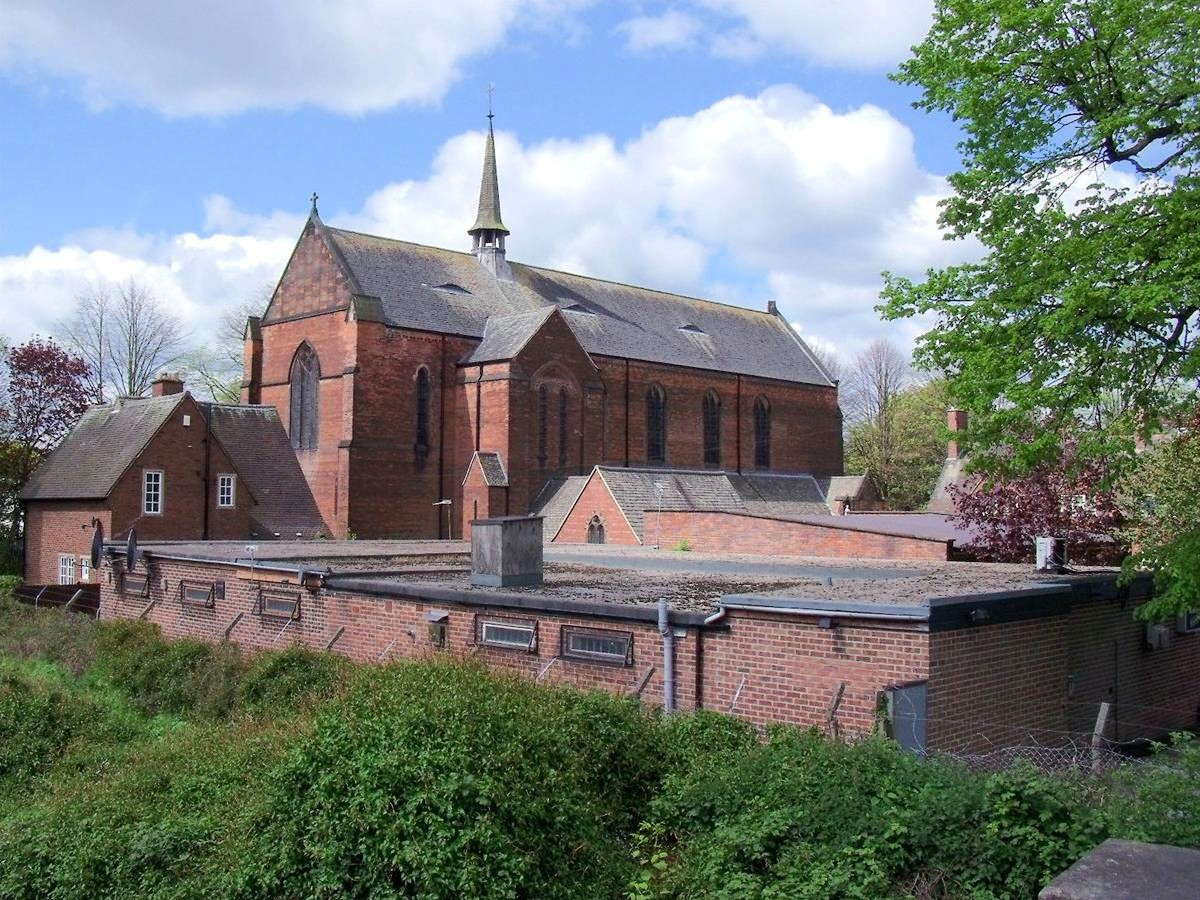
- St Osmund’s Church, Derby

- Location within Derbyshire
- 52°54′14.52″N 1°26′44.51″W
- OS grid reference: SK 37322 34193
- Location: Derby, Derbyshire
- Country: England
- Denomination: Church of England

History
- Dedication: St Osmund
- Consecrated: 2 December 1905

Architecture
- Heritage designation: Grade II listed
- Architect: Percy Heylyn Currey
- Groundbreaking: 6 August 1904

Specifications
- Length: 110 feet (34 m)
- Width: 25 feet (7.6 m)
- Height: 55 feet (17 m)

Administration
- Diocese: Diocese of Derby
- Archdeaconry: Derby
- Deanery: Melbourne
- Parish: St Andrew with St Osmund Derby

St Osmund's Church, Derby is a Grade II listed Church of England parish church in Derby, Derbyshire.

== History ==
The foundation stone was laid on 6 August 1904. The architects were Percy Heylyn Currey and Charles Clayton Thompson, and the contractor was Mr. R. Weston of Derby. It was built of Leicestershire brick, dressed with Matlock stone. It was consecrated by the Bishop of Southwell on 2 December 1905.

In 1971, St Andrew's Church, Derby was demolished and the two parishes were united.

== Organ ==
A pipe organ was installed by Bishop and Son. This was replaced in 2013 by the 1875 organ by Hunter originally in Christ Church, Brixton Road, then Queen's Hall Methodist Church, Derby. A specification of the organ can be found on the National Pipe Organ Register.

== See also ==
- Listed buildings in Alvaston
