= Listed buildings in Dethick, Lea and Holloway =

Dethick, Lea and Holloway is a civil parish in the Amber Valley district of Derbyshire, England. The parish contains 36 listed buildings that are recorded in the National Heritage List for England. Of these, five are listed at Grade II*, the middle of the three grades, and the others are at Grade II, the lowest grade. The parish contains the villages of Dethick, Lea, and Holloway, and the surrounding area. Most of the listed buildings are country houses, smaller houses, cottages, and associated structures. The other listed buildings include churches and chapels, a public house, farmhouses and farm buildings, and a bridge.

== Key ==
Grade	Criteria
II*	Particularly important buildings of more than special interest
II	Buildings of national importance and special interest

== Buildings ==
Name and location	Photograph	Date	Notes	Grade
St John the Baptist's Church, Dethick; 53.11794°N 1.51261°W		Mid 13th century	The church was altered and extended through the centuries, including the tower dated 1530. It is in gritstone with a lead roof, and consists of a nave and a chancel in a single cell with a clerestory, and a west tower. The tower has a plinth, three stages, diagonal stepped buttresses, a west doorway with a four-centred arch, a hood mould rising over a dated plaque, and a moulded string course. Above this is a three-light window, a frieze band with heraldic shields, two-light bell openings, a moulded string course, and an embattled parapet with moulded merlons. On the southeast corner is a polygonal stair turret with an embattled parapet.	II*
Barn north of Church Farmhouse; 53.11825°N 1.51272°W		Late 16th century	The barn is in gritstone with stepped angle buttresses and a slate roof. There are two storeys and seven bays. Some of the openings have four-centred arched heads, and there are later inserted openings.	II
Manor Farmhouse; 53.11803°N 1.51182°W		Late 16th century	The farmhouse, which incorporates remains of an older manor house, is in gritstone on a plinth, with stone slate roofs. There are two storeys, and an irregular U-shaped plan, with a hall range and cross-wings, and a front of six bays. On the front are two doorways with quoined surrounds and massive lintels, one blocked and converted into a window. The windows either have single lights or are mullioned. At the rear is a massive stepped chimney stack and a lean-to.	II*
Lea Hall, gate pier and wall 53.11351°N 1.50356°W		17th century	The north range was added to the house in 1754. The house is in gritstone with brick wings, on a plinth, with quoins, a modillion cornice, and a parapet at the front, and a stone slate roof with coped gables and moulded kneelers. There are two storeys, a double depth plan, and a front of five bays, with recessed wings at the sides. The middle bay is flanked by giant Roman Doric pilasters with a full entablature. Steps lead up to the central doorway that has a Gibbs surround and a pediment. The windows are sashes, with architraves and keystones, those in the outer wings with semicircular heads. At the rear are mullioned windows, and a dated and initialled lintel. The boundary wall at the front incorporates a drinking trough, and ends in a square gate pier with a pyramidal cap.	II*
Leahurst; 53.10038°N 1.51617°W	—	17th century	A small country house that was considerably enlarged and restored in 1825. It is in gritstone, and has roofs with coped gables, moulded kneelers, and ball finials. There are two storeys and attics, and an irregular hall and cross-wing plan. The porch has two storeys and an attic, and contains an entrance with a moulded surround and a four-centred arched head, with a dated plaque over the doorway. Most of the windows are mullioned, and on the garden front is a two-storey canted bay window with an embattled parapet.	II
Cowley Cottage; 53.11337°N 1.50596°W	—	1692	The cottage, which incorporates earlier material, is in gritstone with quoins and a tile roof. There are two ranges, the south range taller with three bays, and the north with two bays. In the south range is a doorway with a chamfered quoined surround and an initialled and dated lintel, and mullioned windows. The north range contains a blocked doorway and an inserted window. At the rear is a continuous hood mould.	II
Outbuilding north-northwest of Babington Farmhouse; 53.11855°N 1.51217°W	—	Early 18th century	The farm building is in sandstone, with quoins, and a stone slate roof with coped gables and plain kneelers. There is a single storey with overlofts. The openings include doorways and a former full-height quoined opening, and in the upper floor are dovecotes and perches.	II
Babington Farmhouse; 53.11827°N 1.51168°W	—	Mid 18th century	The farmhouse, which contains earlier fabric, is in sandstone with quoins and a tile roof. There are two storeys, four bays, and a rear outshut. On the front are three doorways, the main one in the centre with substantial jambs and a lintel, and a semicircular hood, and the doorway to the northwest has a quoined surround. Most of the windows are mullioned with two lights, and contain casements.	II
Outbuilding northwest of Babington Farmhouse; 53.11839°N 1.51220°W	—	Mid 18th century	The farm building is in gritstone, with quoins, and a roof of tile and stone slate. There are four bays, the north bay open and with a single storey, and the other bays with two storeys. The three doorways have quoined surrounds, and the windows are mullioned with casements. There is an external staircase leading to an upper floor doorway with a quoined surround.	II
Lavender Cottage; 53.10295°N 1.51249°W	—	Mid 18th century	A gritstone house with quoins, a moulded eaves cornice, and a stone slate roof with coped gables. There are three storeys, a T-shaped plan, with a two-bay range, a bay to the left with two storeys and an attic, and a single-storey rear range. The central doorway has massive jambs and a lintel, and a bracketed canopy with a ball finial. The windows are mullioned with two lights, and in the left bay is a gabled dormer.	II
The Farm; 53.11362°N 1.50489°W	—	Mid 18th century	The farmhouse is in gritstone with quoins, a roof of stone slate and some tile, and coped gables with moulded kneelers. It has an irregular T-shaped plan, with a range of three storeys and three bays, a lower bay at the south, and a two-storey rear range. In the centre is a lean-to porch and a doorway, above which is a single-light window. The other windows are mullioned and contain sashes. At the end is an external stairway.	II
House west of Yew Tree Inn; 53.10285°N 1.51496°W	—	Mid 18th century	The house, which contains elements of a 17th-century building, has quoins, bands, and a tile roof with coped gables and moulded kneelers. There are three storeys and three bays. On the front is a porch, and the windows are mullioned, with some mullions removed.	II
1–6 Lea Road, Lea Bridge; 53.10327°N 1.52577°W	—	Late 18th century	A terrace of six houses stepped down a hill, in gritstone with quoins with roofs of stone slate and tile. There are three storeys, each house has two bays, and at the rear is a wing with a coped gable and an extension with a parapet. The doorways have massive quoined surrounds and two-light mullioned windows, and some houses have single-light windows.	II
1 and 2 The Row; 53.11427°N 1.51350°W		Late 18th century	A pair of cottages in a terrace, later combined, in gritstone with a stone slate roof. There are three storeys and four bays. The doorways are in the inner bays, and have massive quoined surrounds and lintels, one blocked and converted into a window. The windows are mullioned with two lights, and contain horizontal sashes.	II
Brook Cottage; 53.10117°N 1.52897°W	—	Late 18th century	A gritstone house with quoins and a stone slate roof. There are three storeys and two bays. The windows are casements with wedge lintels and projecting keystones.	II
Bridge northwest of Brook Cottage; 53.10120°N 1.52923°W	—	Late 18th century	The bridge, which carries a road over a stream, is in gritstone. It consists of a single semicircular arch with plain voussoirs, a flat band, and a cambered parapet with rounded copings.	II
Former canal lengthman's cottage 53.09670°N 1.52879°W		Late 18th century	The former lengthsman's cottage is in gritstone and is roofless. There are two storeys and three bays, and it contains two doorways with plain surrounds, one converted into a window.	II
Catmint Cottage and wall 53.11375°N 1.50594°W	—	Late 18th century	The cottage is in gritstone, and has a stone slate roof with coped gables and plain kneelers. There are two storeys and three bays. The central doorway has a quoined surround and a massive lintel, and the windows are sashes. The garden is enclosed by a gritstone wall with half-round copings.	II
Cowhouse and piggery east of Cowley Cottage; 53.11338°N 1.50565°W	—	Late 18th century	The farm building is in gritstone, and has a tile roof with coped gables. There is an L-shaped plan, and the building contains five doorways with quoined surround and heavy lintels, four openings with stable doors, and loft doors. On the south gable end are troughs and piggery doors.	II
Greenbank Cottage; 53.11369°N 1.51357°W	—	Late 18th century	A house and cottage, later combined, in gritstone, with quoins, a moulded eaves cornice, and a tile roof. There are two storeys, three bays, and single-storey rear extensions. There are two storeys, the one to the northwest with substantial jambs and a bracketed hood, and the other has a massive surround and lintel. The windows are sashes.	II
High Croft; 53.11381°N 1.50653°W	—	Late 18th century	A house and outbuilding, later combined, in gritstone, with quoins, and a Welsh slate roof with coped gables and block kneelers. There are two storeys and a basement, and four bays. In the right two bays is a central doorway with a quoined surround and a heavy lintel, and a bracketed hood. The windows are mullioned with two lights. In the left two bays are two basement doorways with massive surrounds, and above are a three-light mullioned window and single light windows.	II
Rose Cottage; 53.11347°N 1.51330°W	—	Late 18th century	The cottage is in gritstone with quoins, and a Welsh slate roof with stone slate eaves. There are two storeys and two bays. The doorway has a quoined and chamfered surround and a four-centred arch, and the windows are casements.	II
Rosedene; 53.10312°N 1.51222°W	—	Late 18th century	A gritstone house with quoins, a tile roof with stone slate eaves, and coped gables with plain kneelers. There are two storeys, two bays, and single-storey extensions and both sides. On the front is a gabled porch with a segmental-arched entrance, and a doorway with substantial lintel and jambs. The windows are mullioned with two lights and contain casements.	II
The Jug and Glass Public House; 53.11429°N 1.51366°W		1782	The public house is in gritstone, with quoins, and a stone slate roof with a coped west gable. There is an L-shaped plan, consisting of a main block with three storeys and two bays, a lower rear two-storey wing, and a single-storey extension on the left. The central doorway has a quoined surround, a bracketed hood, and a dated and inscribed lintel. The windows are 20th-century casements, and above the doorway is an elaborate metal scrollwork bracket carrying the inn sign.	II
Former threshing barn south of The Farm; 53.11325°N 1.50489°W	—	1817	The barn is in gritstone with quoins, and a hipped roof with tiles and stone slate eaves. There are two storeys and five bays. In the centre is a doorway with a massive quoined surround approached by double flights of steps. There is a similar doorway to the east, over which is the date and initials. At the rear are double doors and taking-in doors.	II
Church Farmhouse; 53.11804°N 1.51267°W	—	Early 19th century	The farmhouse, which incorporates earlier material, is in gritstone, with quoins and a tile roof. There are two storeys, and an L-shaped plan, with a three-bay range, and a lower range to the northeast. The central doorway has a rectangular fanlight.	II
Outbuildings northeast of Lea Hurst; 53.10072°N 1.51594°W	—	Early 19th century	The outbuildings, which have been converted into dwellings, are in gritstone, and have a tile roof with coped gables. There are two storeys, and an L-shaped plan, with two ranges at right angles. The main range has five bays, and it contains three segmental pointed arches, mullioned windows, a doorway with a moulded surround, and in the upper floor is a wheel window. The other range has two bays, and it contains a cross window, a mullioned window, and a wheel window.	II
Lea Methodist Church; 53.11403°N 1.50837°W	—	Early 19th century	The chapel is in gritstone on a plinth, with quoins, and a slate roof with ridge tiles. There is a single storey and three bays. In each bay is a tall pointed window incorporating cast iron window frames with Gothic glazing bars. A porch was added in 1956.	II
Outbuilding north of Manor Farmhouse; 53.11818°N 1.51214°W	—	19th century	The outbuilding, which incorporates fragments of decorative stonework from earlier structures, is in sandstone with quoins, coped gables and moulding kneelers. It contains a doorway with a moulded surround and an ogee head in an arched opening, over a stairway to a cellar.	II
Cottage west of The Farm; 53.11364°N 1.50507°W	—	Mid 19th century	The cottage is in gritstone with a tile roof, two storeys and three bays. The central doorway has a plain surround and the windows are sashes.	II
Trinity Methodist Church; 53.10533°N 1.51731°W		1852	A north aisle was added in 1879. The church is in gritstone, and has a slate roof with coped gables, moulded kneelers, and a crucifix finial. It consists of a nave, a north aisle, chancel, and a tower on the east front. The tower has three stages with chamfered bands. In the bottom stage is a porch with a pointed-arched entrance, over which are initials and a date. In the middle stage is a blind circular opening, and the top stage contains arched bell openings, a coved eaves band, and a pyramidal cap. The windows are lancets.	II
Lea Wood Hall, gate piers and wall 53.10222°N 1.51917°W	—	1874–77	A small country house designed by W. Eden Nesfield, built in stone, tile hanging and applied timber framing, with hipped and half-hipped tile roofs and decorative chimney stacks. The house forms an irregular U-shaped plan around a courtyard, and has an entrance front of two storeys and an attic, and two bays, with a timber framed jettied gable. The doorway has a chamfered segmental arch and a hood mould, above which is an oriel window. The garden front has seven bays, and includes a canted two-storey bay window, and the other windows are mullioned and transomed. The boundary wall has ridged copings, and contains entrance gate piers with moulded bases to pyramidal caps.	II*
The Gables; 53.10249°N 1.51901°W	—	1874–77	Originally the stables to Lea Wood Hall, they were designed by W. Eden Nesfield. The building is in gritstone with quoins, and a tile roof, hipped on the west. There is a single storey and three bays. In the centre is a doorway with a quoined surround converted into a window, and the windows have quoined surrounds.	II
The Lodge, gate piers and walls 53.10310°N 1.51922°W	—	1874–77	The lodge at the entrance to Lea Wood Hall was designed by W. Eden Nesfield. There are two storeys, the ground floor is in gritstone, the upper floor is tile hung, and the roof is tiled. The north front is gabled and the upper floor jettied on timber brackets, and the left part of the front facing the drive is also jettied. Flanking the entrance to the drive are gate piers 1.5 metres (4 ft 11 in) high with moulded bases to pyramidal caps. Attached to the piers are curving walls with chamfered copings, ending on the west side in a tall, square pier with a pyramidal cap.	II
Christ Church, Holloway; 53.10893°N 1.51895°W		1901–03	The tower of the church was completed in 1911. The church is in gritstone with tile roofs, and consists of a nave, a south porch, a north transept, a south vestry, a chancel, and a tower at the crossing. The tower has two stages, a polygonal stair turret on the southwest, stepped buttresses, a moulded eaves band, paired bell openings with segmental heads, and embattled parapets with crocketed pinnacles at the corners and centres.	II*
Repton House; 53.10851°N 1.51845°W		c. 1905	The house is in gritstone with a tile roof. There are two storeys and attics, and five bays, with a gable over the outer two bays at each end, and a single-storey extension at both ends. The windows are mullioned, and in the left bay is a canted bay window. The right gable contains an embattled motif, and in the left extension is a verandah and a porch.	II
