= Riber Castle =

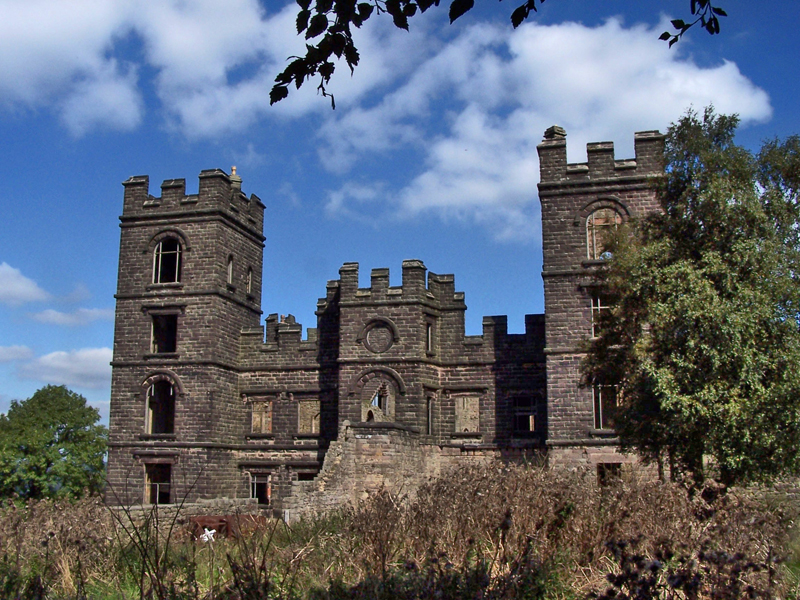
- Riber Castle in 2003

- Location within Derbyshire

General information
- Architectural style: Gothic Revival
- Location: Matlock, Derbyshire, England
- Coordinates: 53°07′40″N 1°32′35″W
- Completed: 1862
- Client: John Smedley

Listed Building – Grade II
- Official name: Riber Castle
- Designated: 22 June 1950
- Reference no.: 1248137

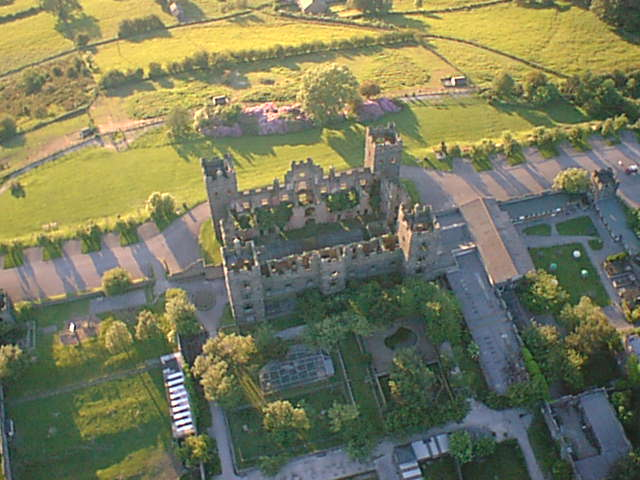
Riber Castle from the air in 2000

Riber Castle is a 19th-century Grade II listed country house in the hamlet of Riber on a hill overlooking Matlock, Derbyshire. It is built of gritstone from a local quarry which was pulled up the 200-metre (660 ft) hill by a series of pulleys.

== History ==
Known locally as "Smedley's Folly" because of the difficulty of getting water to the hill summit, it was built by the industrialist John Smedley in 1862 as his private home. After Smedley’s death in 1874, his widow lived at the castle until her death in 1892. The castle then became a boys' prep school until this became financially unviable in the 1930s. The architectural historian John Summerson attended the school in the early 20th century. While he enjoyed his time at the school, the building's architecture had lesser appeal; he described the castle as "an object of indecipherable bastardy – a true monster". With the coming of World War II the Ministry of Defence used the site for food storage. The MoD left following the war and the castle remained unused until the 1960s.

From the 1960s to September 2000 it was home to a wildlife park, containing British and European fauna. The late 20th century saw increasing criticism of the treatment of animals at the zoo and it closed in 2000.

Plans to turn the shell of the castle into apartments repeatedly failed in the 21st century. However, in 2023, conversion work on the castle began, with plans for enabling development in the grounds. Completion of the castle renovation is planned for the autumn of 2024 and apartments have been listed for sale.

== In popular culture ==
The castle and the town of Matlock are key locations in the Shane Meadows film Dead Man's Shoes.

== See also ==
- Listed buildings in Matlock Town

== Sources ==
- Hartwell, Clare; Pevsner, Nikolaus; Williamson, Elizabeth (2016). Derbyshire. The Buildings Of England. New Haven, US and London: Yale University Press. ISBN 978-0-300-21559-5. OCLC 995068002.
