= Moreton-in-Marsh and Batsford War Memorial =

War memorial in Moreton-in-Marsh, Gloucestershire, England

Coordinates: 51°59′27.9″N 1°42′11″W

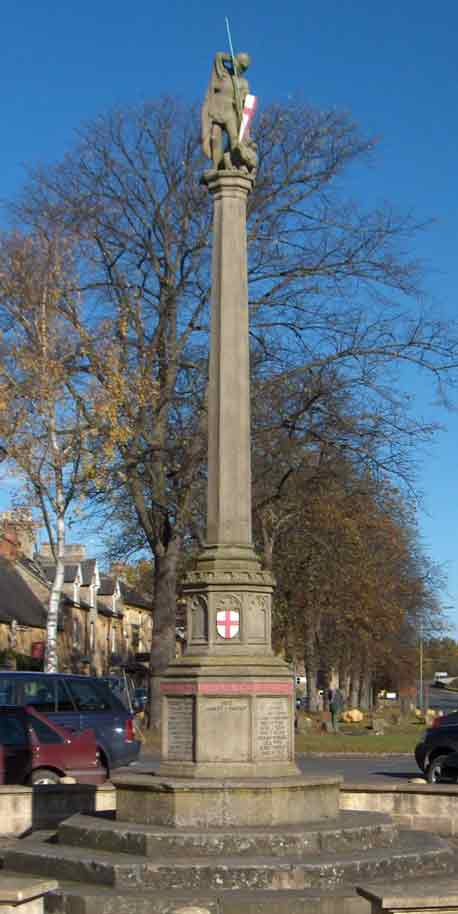
War Memorial, Moreton-in-Marsh

Moreton-in-Marsh and Batsford War Memorial stands in Moreton-in-Marsh, Gloucestershire, England, and is a memorial to those of Moreton and Batsford killed in the First and Second World Wars. The erection of the memorial on the High Street began in November 1920. It is built of Hollington stone from Staffordshire and stands 24 feet (7.3 m) high. The work was carried out by R. I. Boulton and Sons of Cheltenham to Guy Dawber's design. Carved at the top of the memorial are the figures of St. George and the Dragon from the model prepared by the sculptor, Allan Wyon of London. The total cost was around £700, raised primarily from public subscriptions.

The memorial consists of an octagonal flight of five steps, upon which stands a sur-base containing panels surmounted around the top by the inscription "In grateful memory of the men of Moreton and Batsford who gave their lives in the Great War". On four panels are inscribed the names of the forty-four men who died. On a fifth panel was later inscribed "These men also gave their lives 1939-1945" with the names of seven men who fell in the Second World War.

On the sur-base is superimposed another base block with cusped and traceried panels containing the arms of the County of Gloucestershire and St. George emblazoned in colour and gilt. Above this rises an octagonal shaft crowned by the carved figure of St. George and the Dragon.

The unveiling took place on the afternoon of Saturday 26 March 1921, when there was a large crowd from Moreton and the surrounding villages. Over seventy of the local branch of the Comrades of the Great War paraded under Captain Henderson, as did the Girl Guides under Miss D. Southorn, the Boy Scouts under Scoutmaster Haines, and nurses from the VAD Hospital at Kitebrook under their Commandant, Mrs. Pritchard OBE.

Sir Gilbert Wills of Batsford Park gave a brief address before the monument was formally unveiled by Lord Redesdale.

In 2001, a further "peacetime" casualty was added to the memorial. In 2018 the name of a female SOE agent killed in a concentration camp in 1944 was added.

The book Moreton in Marsh & Batsford War Memorial ISBN 0-907616-36-4 by war memorial researcher Kenneth Fowler was written about this War Memorial and all those commemorated upon it and includes the military burials in Moreton-in-Marsh cemetery.
