= St Giles' Church, Matlock =

St Giles’ Church, Matlock
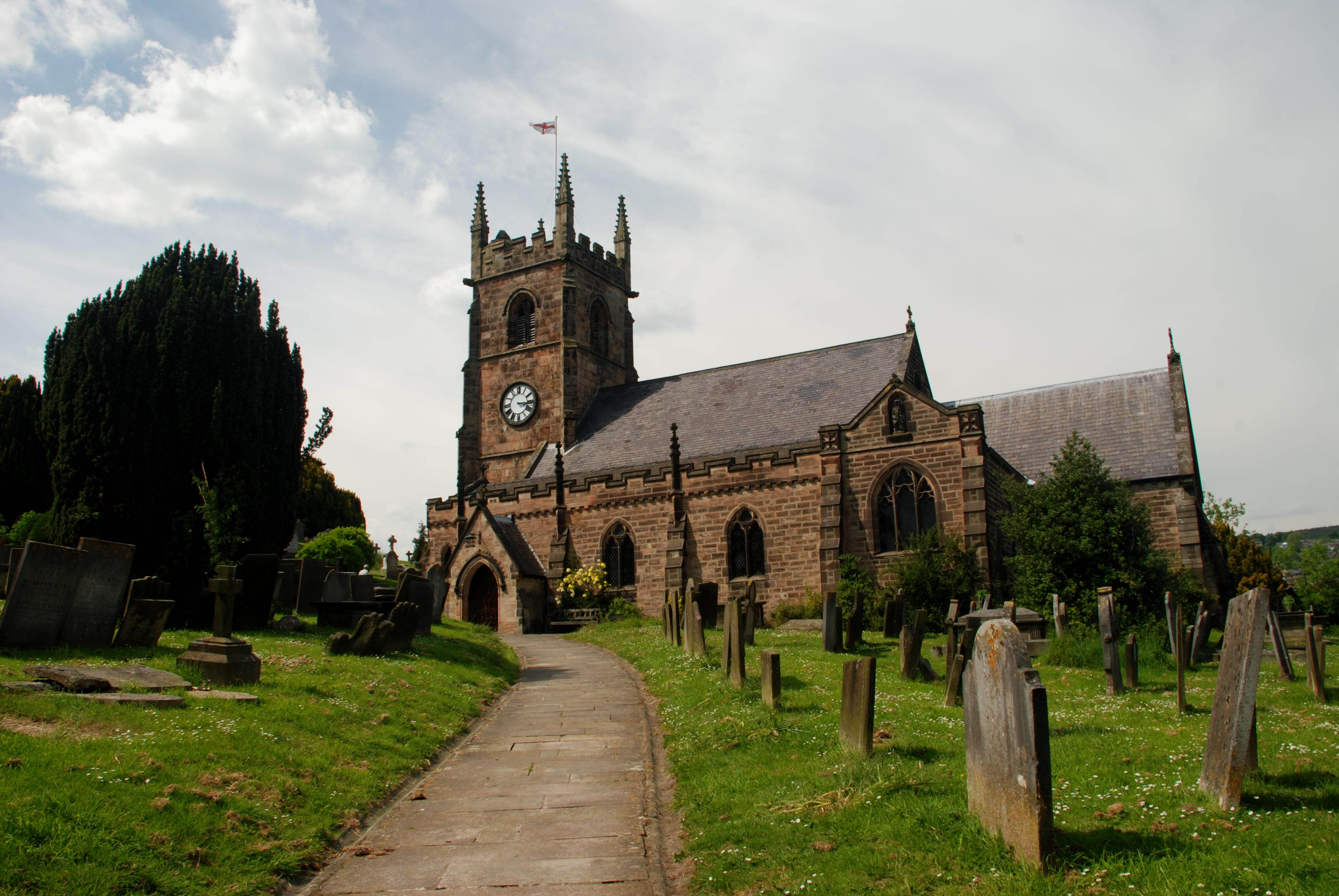
- St Giles’ Church, Matlock

- Location within Derbyshire
- 53°08′3.1″N 1°33′6.1″W
- Location: Matlock, Derbyshire
- Country: England
- Denomination: Church of England
- Website: stgilesmatlock.co.uk

History
- Dedication: St Giles

Architecture
- Heritage designation: Grade II* listed

Administration
- Province: Canterbury
- Diocese: Derby
- Archdeaconry: Chesterfield
- Deanery: Wirksworth
- Parish: Matlock

St Giles' Church, Matlock is a Grade II* listed parish church in the Church of England in Matlock, Derbyshire.

== History ==
The church is medieval. The south porch was added in 1636. The south aisle was rebuilt in 1760, and the north aisle rebuilt in 1763 by Sir Richard Arkwright. Arkwright was initially buried at this church before his remains were removed to the family chapel (now St Mary's Church, Cromford) near the home he began for himself at Willersley Castle after the latter building's completion in 1797.

The chancel dates from 1859 and was rebuilt to the designs of G.H. Stokes. It was re-opened by the Archdeacon of Derby on 23 December 1859.

In 1871, substantial restoration works were undertaken. The last service was held on New Year's Day, 1871. The whole church, with the exception of the tower and chancel were pulled down and rebuilt by Benjamin Wilson of Derby. The church was reopened by the Rt. Revd. Bishop Hobhouse on 26 October 1871

The present south aisle and chapel were built in 1897-98 by Percy Heylyn Currey of Derby at a cost of £1,500. The church was re-opened on 19 May 1898.

The chancel paneling was removed in 1969.

== Parish status ==
The church is in a joint parish with

- St John the Baptist's Church, Dethick
- Christ Church, Holloway
- St John the Baptist's Chapel, Matlock Bath

== Organ ==
The pipe organ was built by Brindley & Foster in 1873. It was rebuilt in 1898 by A. Kirkland, and in 1908 by J.H Adkins of Derby, and in 1996 by M.C. Thompson. A specification of the organ can be found on the National Pipe Organ Register.

== Bells ==
The church tower contains a ring of 8 bells dating from 1904. They were cast by Mears and Stainbank.

== See also ==
- Grade II* listed buildings in Derbyshire Dales
- Listed buildings in Matlock Town
