= Church of St Mary the Virgin, Plumtree =

Church in Nottinghamshire, England

Coordinates: 52°53′30″N 01°05′14″W

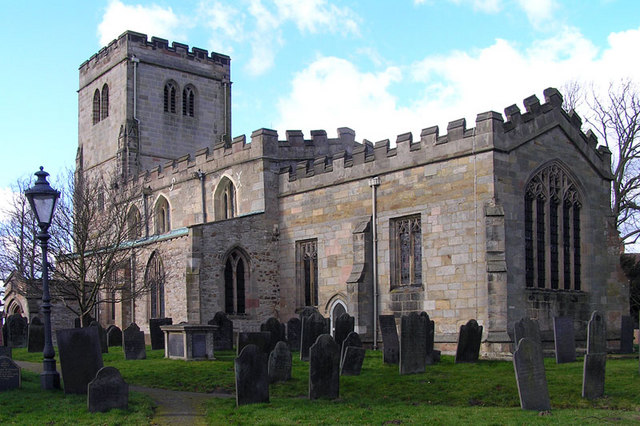
- Church of St Mary the Virgin, Plumtree
- Denomination: Church of England
- Churchmanship: Broad Church
- Website: Church of St Mary the Virgin, Plumtree Parish

History
- Dedication: St Mary

Administration
- Province: York
- Diocese: Southwell and Nottingham
- Parish: Plumtree, Nottinghamshire

Clergy
- Vicar: In vacancy

The Church of St Mary the Virgin, Plumtree is a parish church in the Church of England in Plumtree, Nottinghamshire.

The church is Grade I listed by the Department for Digital, Culture, Media and Sport as it is a building of special architectural or historic interest.

== History ==
The church is medieval but was heavily restored between 1873 and 1874, by George Frederick Bodley and Thomas Garner. The tower was rebuilt in 1906 by Percy Heylyn Currey. Stained glass in the east of the chancel is said to be by Burlison and Grylls.

== Clock ==
The church had an early clock by Richard Roe in 1686. This was replaced in 1889 with a new clock by William Cope, the gift of William Eilliott Burnside. This was removed in 2009.

== See also ==
- Grade I listed buildings in Nottinghamshire
- Listed buildings in Plumtree, Nottinghamshire
