= Plumtree, Nottinghamshire =

Village and civil parish in England

Coordinates: 52.901°N 1.094°W

Plumtree
- Village and civil parish
- Location within Nottinghamshire
- Interactive map of Plumtree
- Area: 1.58 sq mi (4.1 km^{2})
- Population: 259 (2021)
  - Density: 164/sq mi (63/km^{2})
- OS grid reference: SK 613329
  - London: 105 mi (169 km) SSE
- District: Rushcliffe
- Shire county: Nottinghamshire
- Region: East Midlands
- Country: England
- Sovereign state: United Kingdom
- Post town: NOTTINGHAM
- Postcode district: NG12
- Dialling code: 0115 (937)
- Police: Nottinghamshire
- Fire: Nottinghamshire
- Ambulance: East Midlands
- UK Parliament: Rushcliffe
- Website: www.plumtreeparishcouncil.org.uk

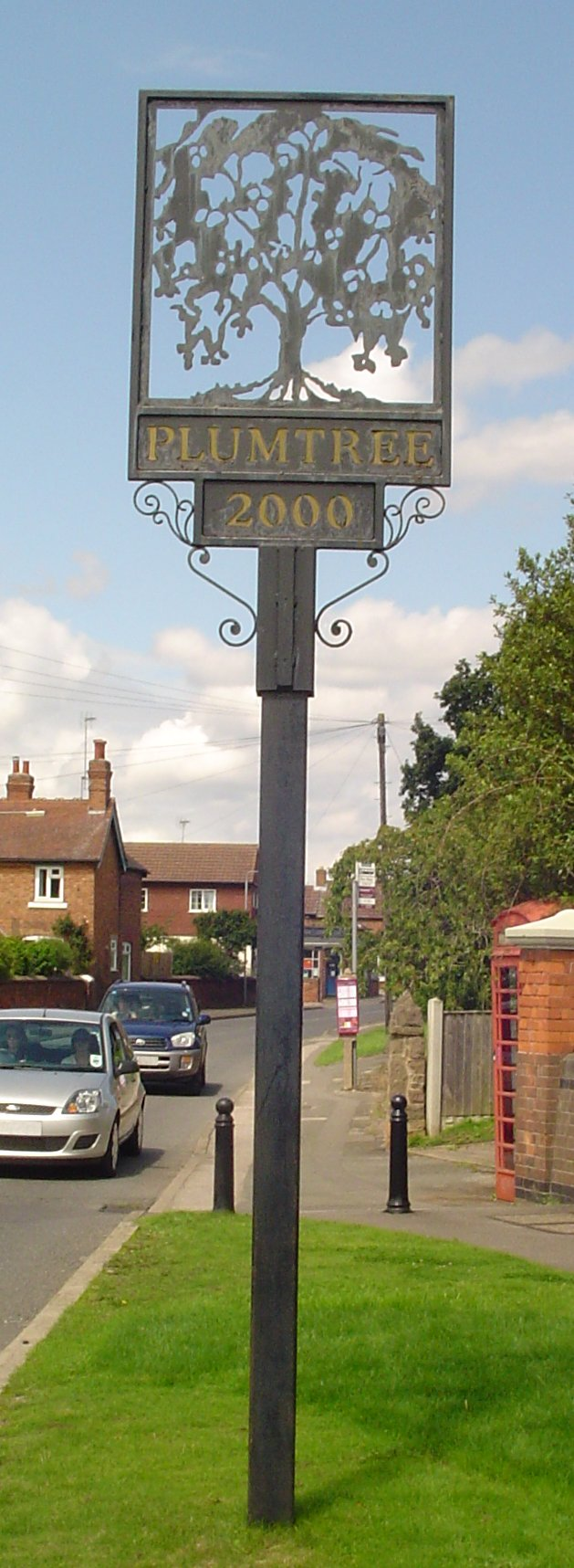
Signpost in Plumtree

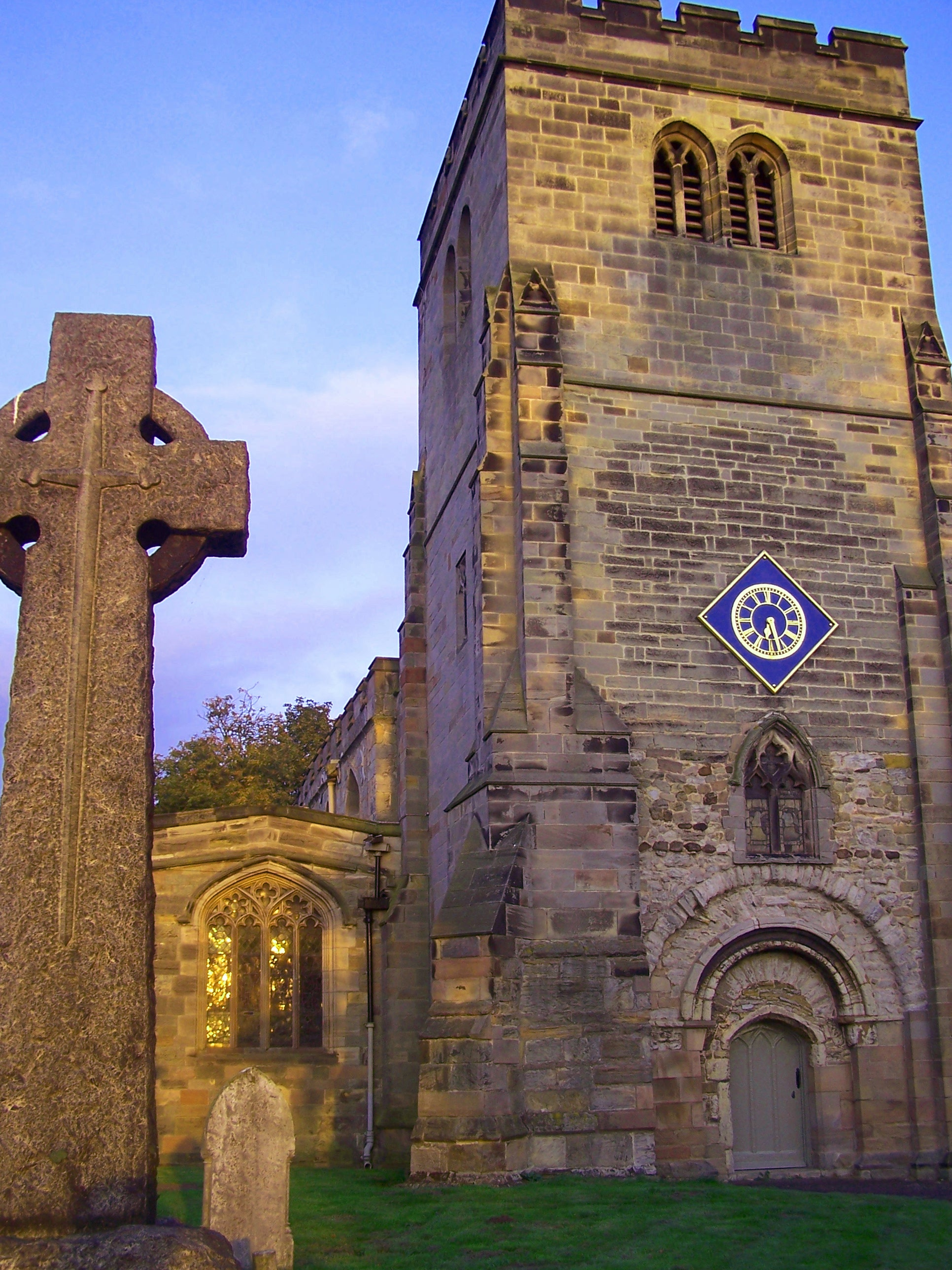
St Mary's Church

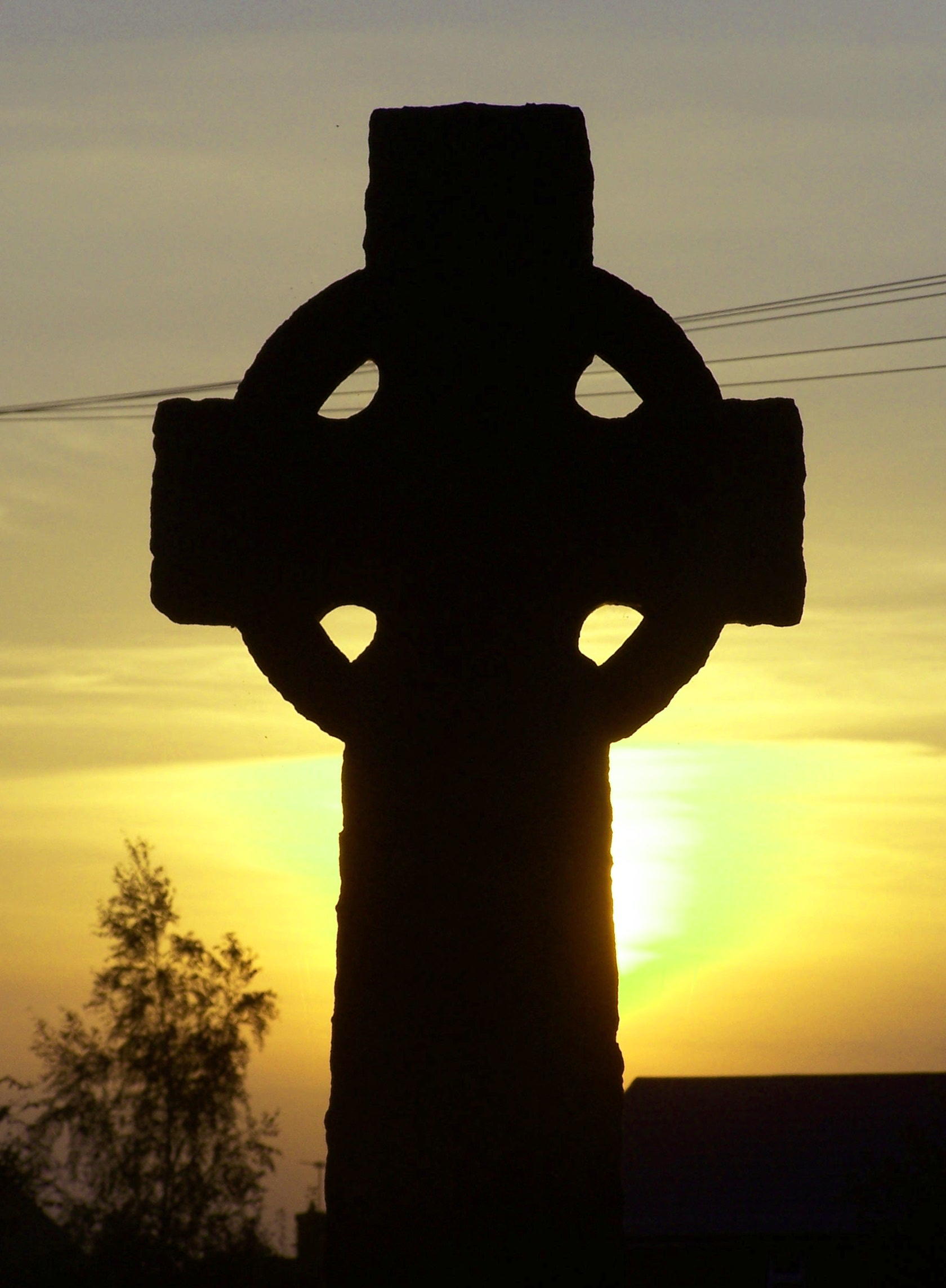
The War Memorial

Plumtree is a village and civil parish in the borough of Rushcliffe, Nottinghamshire. At the time of the 2001 census it had a population of 221, increasing to 246 at the 2011 census, and 259 at the 2021 census. It is situated 5 miles south east of Nottingham, between the villages of Tollerton and Keyworth. Some of the farming land around the village is owned by the Duchy of Cornwall (King Charles III). The parish church of St Mary has a Norman tower on Saxon foundations, which were found when the tower was rebuilt in 1906. The nave is of 13th-century date. The north aisle was rebuilt and extended with stone from Nottingham's medieval Trent Bridge in 1873. Edward Hagarty Parry (1855–1931), an association footballer who captained Old Carthusians F.C. when they won the 1881 FA Cup Final against Old Etonians, is buried in the churchyard.

Plumtree Mill was a two-storey wooden post mill mounted on an open trestle raised on piers atop a mound. Derelict by 1907, it was burnt down c. 1930. The mound is still extant.

Plumtree also has one of the leading cricket clubs in Nottinghamshire, being members of both the Nottinghamshire Premier League and 2012 Champions of the Newark Alliance. The club has invested over £180,000 in its facilities over the winter of 2012–13 with substantial grants from the England & Wales Cricket Board and local authorities.

== History ==
The manor of Plumtree was held in medieval times by the Hastings family, who secured Plumtree as part of their offices as Chief Steward to the Crown. The family continued to hold Plumtree for several centuries. In 1637, Edmund Hastings Esq., a descendant, had extensive property dealings with John Levett, a York barrister, who had married Hastings's wife's Copley family niece.

== See also ==
- Listed buildings in Plumtree, Nottinghamshire
