= Listed buildings in Alvaston =

Alvaston is an electoral ward in the city of Derby, England. The ward contains 14 listed buildings that are recorded in the National Heritage List for England. Of these, three are listed at Grade II*, the middle of the three grades, and the others are at Grade II, the lowest grade. The ward was initially a village, and it has grown to become a suburb of the city. Towards the north of the ward are the former Tri Junct Station and the Derby Railway Works, and associated with them are four listed buildings. Some of the oldest listed buildings, consisting of cottages and a farmhouse, are located near the original centre of the village. The other listed buildings include churches and associated structures, a former toll house, and a conference centre.

== Key ==
Grade	Criteria
II*	Particularly important buildings of more than special interest
II	Buildings of national importance and special interest

== Buildings ==
Name and location	Photograph	Date	Notes	Grade
Church Farmhouse; 52.89531°N 1.41909°W		16th century	The farmhouse has a cruck frame with external close studded timber framing on a stone plinth, partly replaced by brick, and a thatched roof. The main range has two storeys and two bays, to the north is a partial outshut with one storey and an attic, and to the west is a single-bay wing. Most of the windows are casements, there are two roof dormers, and in the wing is a three-light mullioned window. Inside the farmhouse are two cruck frames.	II
3 Church Street; 52.89516°N 1.41902°W	—	Late 16th or early 17th century	The house is timber framed with plaster and brick infill, and has a thatched roof covered in asbestos sheeting. There is a single storey and an attic, and an incorporated outbuilding wing on the left. The windows, which are horizontally-sliding sashes, and the doorway, have cambered heads, and in the attic is a flat-headed casement window.	II
Elm Cottage; 52.89470°N 1.41899°W	—	Late 16th or early 17th century	A cottage that has been much altered, it is in painted brick with a tile roof. There are two storeys and a single-storey rear lean-to. The cottage contains a casement window and a horizontally-sliding sash window.	II
1 Church Street; 52.89494°N 1.41903°W	—	Early 19th century	A house in painted brick with a tile roof and two storeys, the gable end facing the street. In the gable end are casement windows with cambered heads. The front has a doorway and sash windows, those in the ground floor with cambered heads. To the left is an earlier lower cottage, now incorporated in the house.	II
The Poplars; 52.89528°N 1.42455°W	—	Early 19th century	A stuccoed house on a stone base, with overhanging eaves and a hipped slate roof. There are two storeys and three bays. In the centre is a porch with reeded columns and a canopy with a cornice, and a doorway with a rectangular fanlight. The windows are sashes with keystones, and on the side wall is an iron shield of arms.	II
Former engine shed 52.91662°N 1.46055°W	—	1839	The engine shed was designed by Robert Stephenson for the Tri Junct Station. Now surrounded by later buildings, it is in red brick with a slate roof. Its plan has 16 sides, and a diameter of about 130 feet (40 m).	II*
Former Railway Workshop, Derby Railway Works; 52.91755°N 1.46111°W	—	1839	The workshops were built for the Midland Counties Railway, and have since been converted for other uses. The building is in red brick with stone dressings and slate roofs. It consists of a triple-pile single-storey shed, and a double-pile two-storey workshop incorporating an engine house, and later ancillary buildings.	II*
Former Carriage Shop, Derby Railway Works; 52.91696°N 1.46055°W	—	c. 1840	The carriage shop was designed by Francis Thompson for the North Midland Railway. It is in red brick with stone dressings, a cast iron frame, and roofs of tile and Welsh slate. The north front has 13 bays containing a two-bay single-storey smithy, an eight-bay two-storey carriage shop, and a three-storey office block. The windows are sashes with segmental heads.	II*
997 London Road; 52.90269°N 1.43947°W		Mid 19th century	A toll house, later a private house, it is in red brick with stone dressings, long and short quoins, and a slate roof with coped gables and kneelers. There are two storeys, the gable end faces the road, and there are flanking recessed single-storey wings. On the front is a projecting porch with pilasters, containing a doorway and side lights, and a hipped roof. Above the porch is a three-light mullioned window, over which is a curved tympanum containing a carving.	II
St Michael's Church; 52.89624°N 1.41823°W		1855–56	The church, which was designed by H. I. Stevens, is in sandstone with freestone dressings and a slate roof. It consists of a nave, north and south aisles, a south porch, a chancel, a northeast vestry, and a west tower. The tower has three stages, clasping buttresses, a south doorway with a chamfered surround, and a three-light west window. On the west front is a clock face with a hood mould, the bell openings have two lights, and at the top is an embattled parapet with corner pinnacles.	II
Clock Tower; 52.91658°N 1.46110°W		1893	The clock tower was originally part of the Tri Junct Station designed by Francis Thompson. It was formerly detached, but later incorporated in a brick building. It is in stone and has four stages, the bottom stage rusticated and containing a round-arched doorway, above which is a pediment. Over this is a moulded cornice, a moulded eaves cornice, and a circular window. At the top is a timber lantern with a clock face on each side, and a pyramidal roof with a weathervane in the form of Stephenson's Rocket.	II
St Osmund's Church; 52.90394°N 1.44654°W		1904	The church, which was designed by P. H. Currey, is in red brick with freestone dressings and a slate roof. It consists of a nave with a tall clerestory, north and south aisles, northwest and southwest porches, and a chancel with a north organ chamber and vestry and a south chapel. On the roof are eyebrow ventilators, and a shingled flèche. The northwest porch has a buttress containing a niche with a statue of Saint Osmund. The entrance is flanked by granite shafts, and the doors are recessed under a tympanum with an inscription. The windows are tall lancets.	II
St Osmond's Vicarage and St Osmond's House; 52.90420°N 1.44664°W	—	c. 18419050	A pair of houses designed by P. H. Currey in red brick with a tile roof. There is a single storey and attics, and five gabled bays. On the front are two doorways in semicircular recesses, a canted bay window in the left bay, and the other windows are casements.	II
Derby Conference Centre; 52.90443°N 1.44834°W		1937–38	The centre originated as the Railway School of Transport, designed by W. H. Hamlyn for the London, Midland and Scottish Railway. It is in brick with Portland stone dressings and cladding to the ground floor, and a pantile roof on the main range. There are three storeys, a main front with eleven bays, flanked by single-storey wings with corner obelisks, and with one- and two-storey wings at the rear. On the front, the middle bay projects, and contains a porch with pilasters, over which is an inscribed frieze and a parapet with urns, and above which is a tall stair window. The other windows are casements, and between the ground floor windows are bas-relief carvings with railway themes. The windows in the middle floor have keystones. On the roof is a two-stage lantern surmounted by a cupola with weathervane and a gilded star.	II
