= Guy Dawber =

English architect (1861–1938)

Sir Guy Dawber
- Born: 3 August 1861; King's Lynn, Norfolk
- Died: 24 April 1938 (aged 76); Hamilton Terrace, London

Sir Edward Guy Dawber RA (3 August 1861 – 24 April 1938) was an English architect working in the late Arts and Crafts style, whose work is particularly associated with the Cotswolds.

== Biography ==
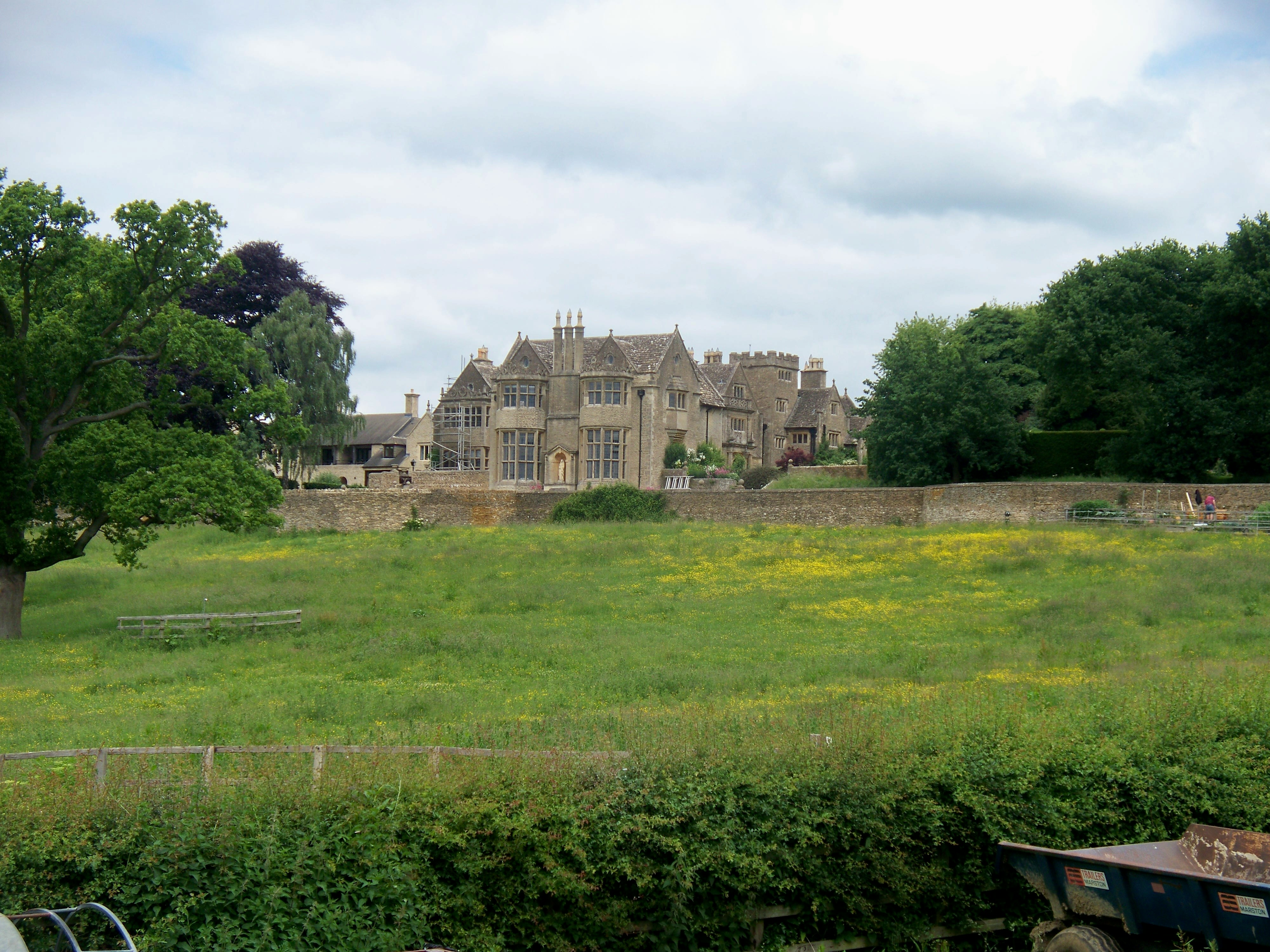
Nether Swell Manor

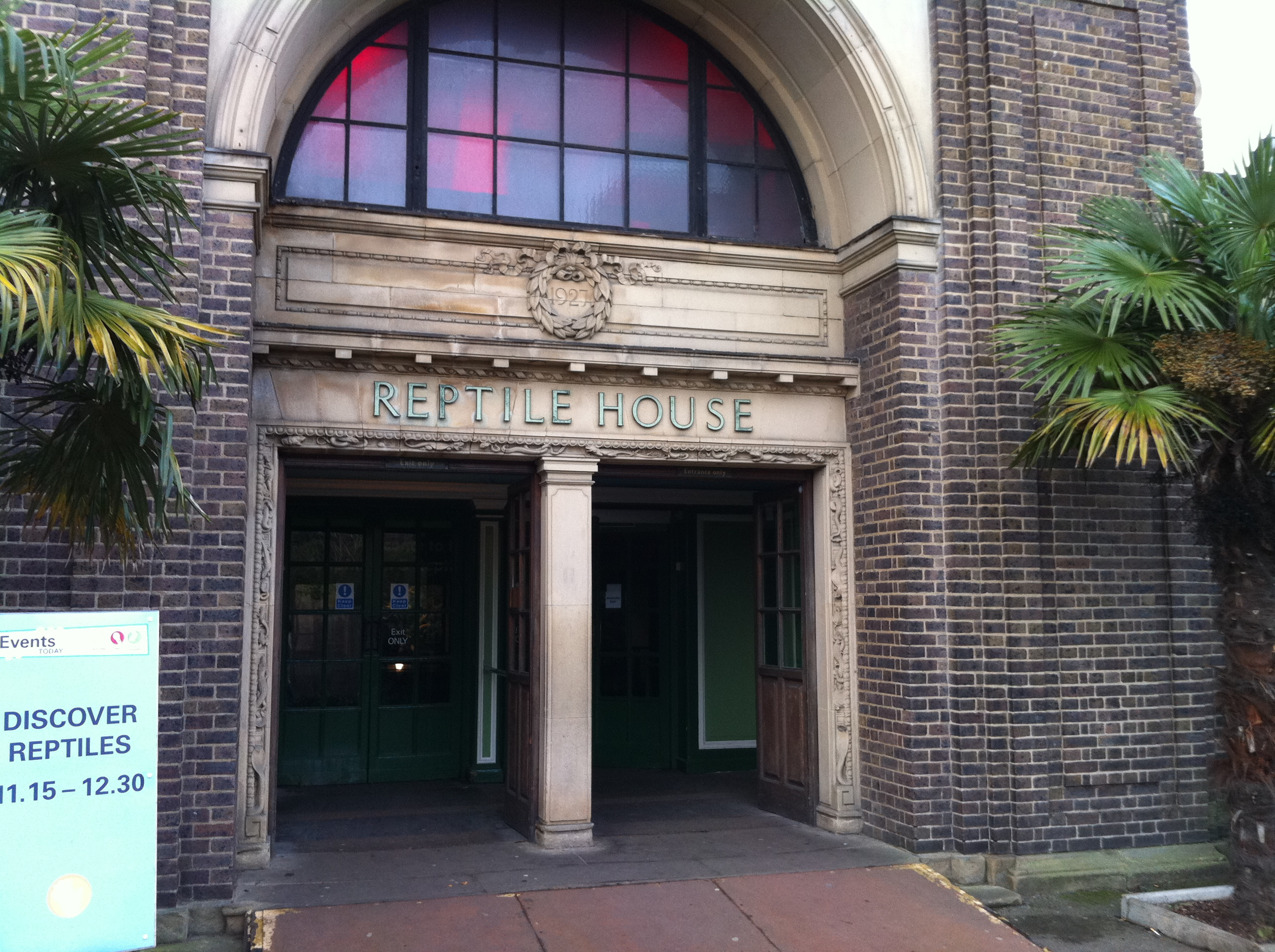
Reptile House entrance, London Zoo

Edward Guy Dawber was born in Britain in 1861, at King's Lynn, Norfolk, the son of a merchant. He trained in the practice of Sir Ernest George and Harold Peto, supervising their work on Batsford Park (1887–93), near Moreton-in-Marsh, in the Cotswolds.In 1896 he married Mary Eccles in Lancashire.

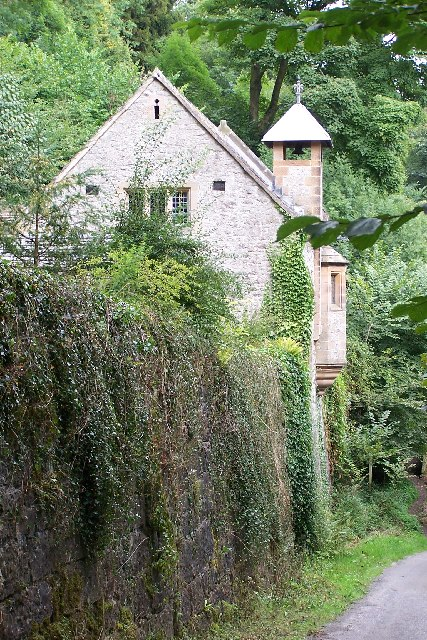
Chapel of St John the Baptist

In 1897 Dawber designed St John the Baptist's Chapel, Matlock Bath in Matlock Dale, Derbyshire, when he lived locally. It was the only church designed by him. Dawber designed the Old Post Office at 25 High Street, Broadway, Worcestershire, which was built in Cotswold stone by Espley & Co of Evesham in 1899 and opened on Friday 1 December 1899. He also designed Bibsworth House, Broadway. Dawber sometimes also worked on the landscaping of the estates on which his houses were built, for example at Eyford Park in Gloucestershire.

Working in the Cotswold vernacular tradition, Dawber became a respected and scholarly architect, designing and converting houses such as Nether Swell Manor (1903 and 1909) and Eyford Park (1911–12), both near Stow-on-the-Wold. In 1905 Batsford published Dawber's Old Cottages, Farm-houses and other Stone Buildings in the Cotswold District. From 1925 to 1927 Dawber was President of the Royal Institute of British Architects. In 1928 he was awarded the RIBA Royal Gold Medal. In 1926 he played a prominent part in establishing the Council for the Preservation of Rural England, and became its first President. In that year he worked on the design of the Reptile House at London Zoo, Regent's Park, opened in 1927. About 1928 he designed many buildings of Lord Wandsworth College, Hampshire.

He was knighted in 1936 and died in London on 24 April 1938. He is buried at St Giles's church with his parents and brother.

== Works ==
- St John the Baptist's Chapel, Matlock Bath, Derbyshire (1897, Grade II*)
- Nether Swell Manor Farm Cottages, Gloucestershire (1902-04, Grade II)
- Nether Swell Manor, Gloucestershire (1903, Grade II) and its gatepiers (1906-09, Grade II) and lodge (1903, Grade II)
- 6 Linnell Drive, Hampstead Garden Suburb, Barnet, London NW11 (1908, Grade II)
- Conkwell Grange, Wiltshire (1907, Grade II)
- Burdocks (previously known as Claremont House), Milton End, Fairford, Gloucestershire, (1911, Grade II listed)

War memorials

- Moreton-in-Marsh and Batsford War Memorial, Cotswold, Gloucestershire (1908, Grade II)
- Northiam War Memorial, East Sussex. (1920-21, Grade II)
- Long Wittenham War Memorial, Oxfordshire. (1920, Grade II)
- Wallingford War Memorial, Oxfordshire. (1921, Grade II)
