= Dethick, Lea and Holloway =

Civil parish in Derbyshire, England

Coordinates: 53°06′36″N 1°30′50″W

Dethick, Lea, Holloway
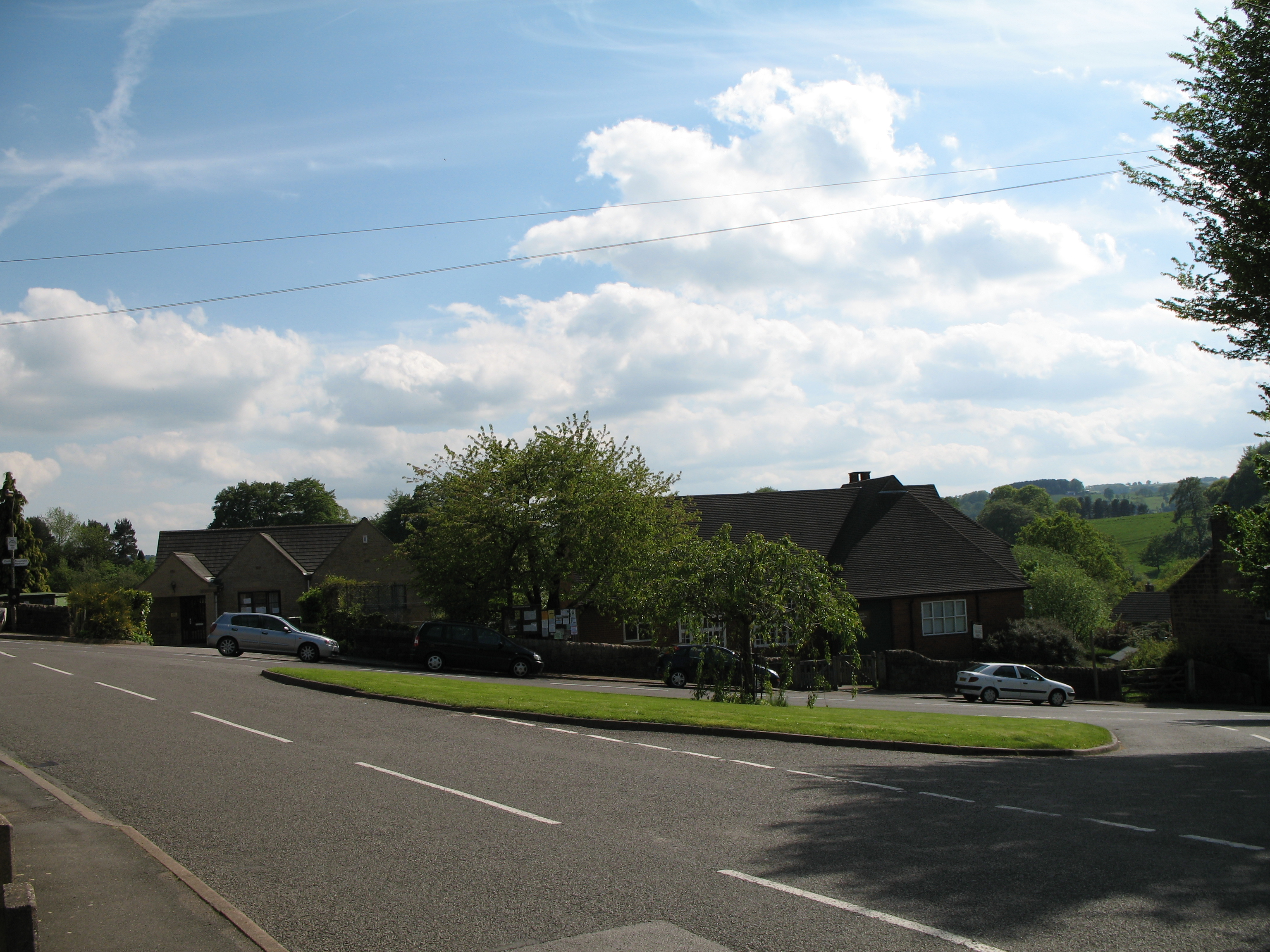
- The Doctors Surgery and Florence Nightingale Memorial Hall in Holloway

- Location within Derbyshire
- Population: 1,027 (2011)
- Civil parish: Dethick, Lea and Holloway
- District: Amber Valley
- Shire county: Derbyshire
- Region: East Midlands
- Country: England
- Sovereign state: United Kingdom
- Post town: MATLOCK
- Postcode district: DE4
- Dialling code: 01629
- Police: Derbyshire
- Fire: Derbyshire
- Ambulance: East Midlands
- UK Parliament: Amber Valley

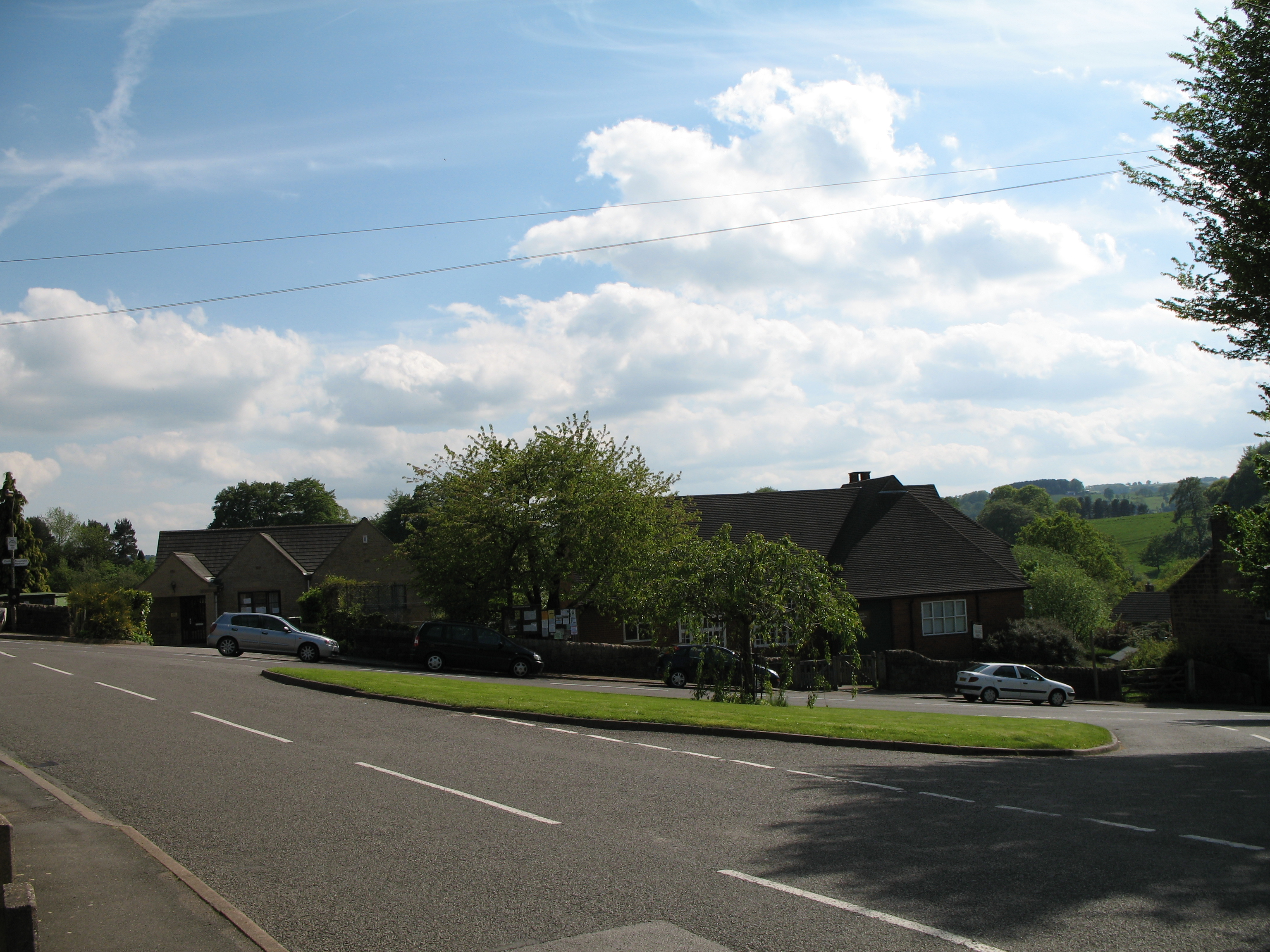
The Doctors Surgery and Florence Nightingale Memorial Hall in Holloway

Dethick, Lea and Holloway is a civil parish (and, since 1899, an ecclesiastical parish), in the Amber Valley borough of the English county of Derbyshire. The population of the civil parish taken at the 2011 census was 1,027.

It is located in central Derbyshire, south east of Matlock, and, as its name suggests, contains the three main settlements – Dethick, Lea and Holloway, as well as the younger village of Lea Bridge.

The area's most notable family is the Nightingales, who were substantial landowners in the area and spent the summers there. Florence Nightingale stayed at Lea Hurst, and, during the 1880s, nursed her mother and rendered charitable work in the communities of Lea, Holloway and nearby Whatstandwell.

== Holloway ==
The largest of the settlements that compose this civil parish is Holloway, at grid reference SK326562. Holloway has a village shop serving the parish, called 'Mayfield Stores'. Additionally, it is home to a doctor's surgery, a Methodist chapel, the Yew Tree public house (closed in 2008), a village butcher and a small art gallery. The southeastern area of the village is known as 'Leashaw', and the collection of houses scattered among the hills to the east is known as 'Upper Holloway'.

Leashaw is the location of Lea Hurst, famous for being built by the Nightingale family as their summer home.

A cotton mill was built in 1784 at Holloway by Peter Nightingale (a great uncle of Florence). He was sued by Richard Arkwright for infringement of patents. Although Arkwright won the case, it attracted the attention of the Lancashire pirate spinners, who in the end succeeded in getting the patents revoked. The mills were later sold to Thomas Smedley, whose son founded Smedley's Hydro in Matlock. The mill was converted to spinning worsted.

Leawood Hall off Mill Lane is a Grade II* listed Arts and Crafts house.

== Lea ==
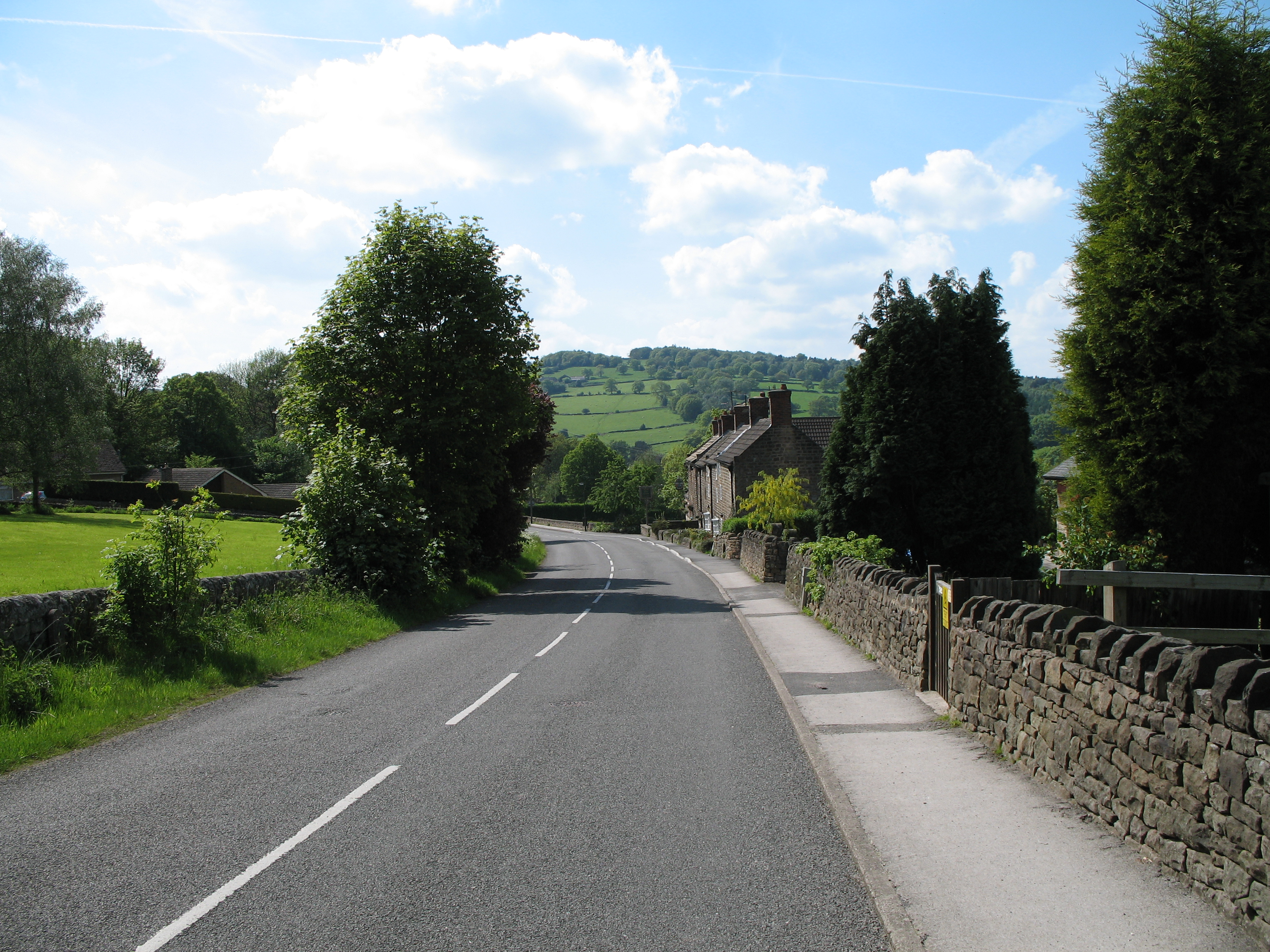
Lea Main Road; the Jug & Glass pub is on the right

Lea lies north of Holloway at grid reference SK330575 and is, by population, the second biggest settlement in the parish. Unlike Dethick and Holloway, Lea is mentioned briefly in the Domesday Book when it was spelt Lede and was owned by Ralph fitzHurbert. Lea is the location of a council owned youth activity centre called Lea Green, the house was built as a home by Joseph Wass Esq. a wealthy local lead smelter and miner, lately inhabited by the Marsden Smedley family. Lea also has a public house called the Jug & Glass. There is also a small park, with play equipment for the youth of the parish.

== Lea Bridge ==
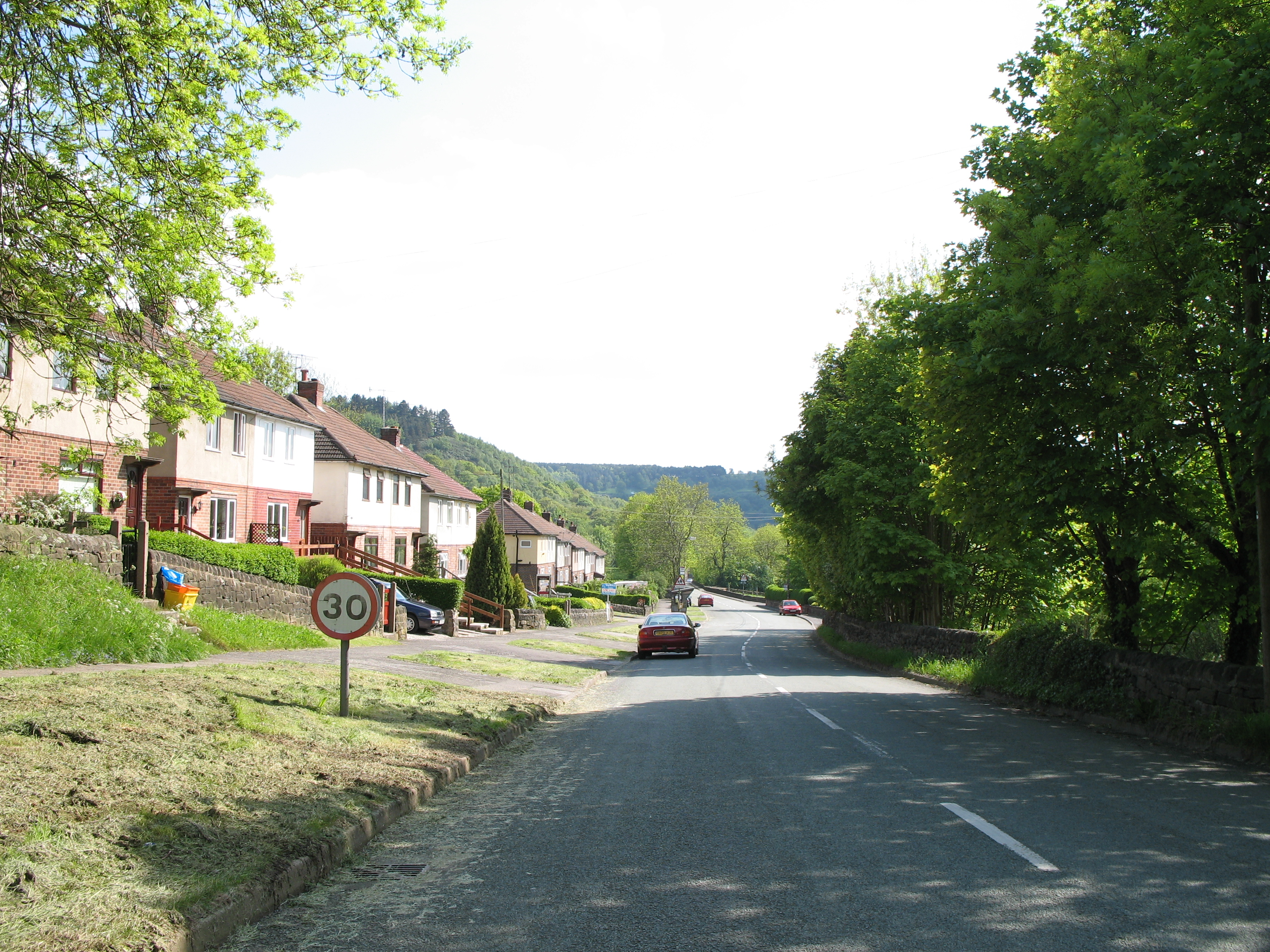
A view of Lea Bridge

Geographically lowest of the settlements, Lea Bridge lies in the valley to the west of Holloway and to the southwest of Lea at grid reference SK318563. This settlement grew around the need for workers houses for the nearby mills. Lea Bridge was considered an ideal location for the mills due to the power source in the form of Lea Brook which runs through the valley and into the river Derwent. The only one still operating is Smedleys, which celebrated its 230th anniversary in 2014. Lea Bridge has a small football pitch and a large pond, known by the locals as the "mill pitch" and the "mill pond" respectively.

== Dethick ==
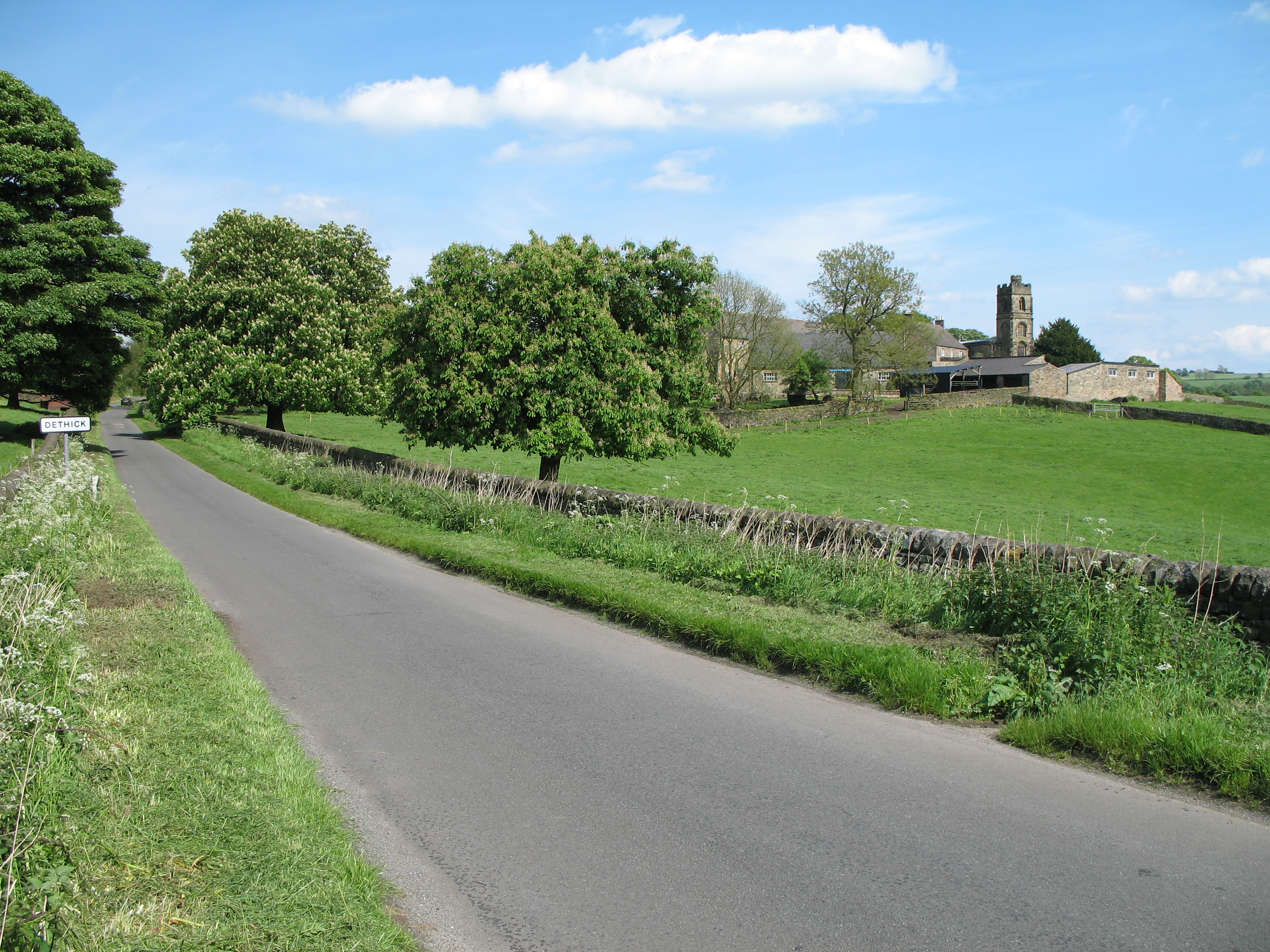
Dethick and surrounding fields

Smallest of the settlements, but perhaps with the most interesting history, is Dethick. Dethick shares its name with the Dethick family, whose roots there can be traced with certainty to 1228, but who may well have been established there earlier. Historically the most notable family to be associated with Dethick are the Babingtons of Dethick Manor; Anthony Babington was executed for his leading role in a plot to rescue Mary, Queen of Scots, from imprisonment by her cousin Queen Elizabeth I of England. It will be found at grid reference SK327580.

An 1891 source describes the parish of Dethick as follows: "The church of St. John the Baptist is a small edifice of stone, dating from 1220, and consists of chancel, nave and a lofty western tower, dated 1535, containing one small bell: there are three memorial windows, and 60 sittings. ... The soil is sandy; subsoil, gritstone. The chief crops are wheat, barley, oats and about one-half the land is in pasture. The acreage is 1,826; rateable value, £4,748; the population in 1881 was 1,036." In 1530-32, Anthony Babington (an ancestor of the plotter) raised the original 13th-century roof by means of clerestory windows and added the unusual tower, distinctive of Dethick.

== Accessibility ==
Although extremely rural, the parish has remained a popular place to live thanks to its relatively strong accessibility for such a small place. The towns of Alfreton, Belper, Matlock and Ripley are all just 15 minutes away. Derby, Chesterfield and Junction 28 of the M1 are also nearby, with journey times of around 25 minutes.

== Facilities ==
The parish has one pub, a grocery, a butcher, a village hall, a church, a chapel, a Primary school and public toilets. The parish is able to receive ADSL Broadband, and since the digital switchover of the Bolehill transmitter in 2011, Freeview television. There is a once-hourly bus route (the 140/141/142) that stops in Lea Bridge, Holloway and Leashaw, connecting the Parish with Matlock, Belper, Ripley and Alfreton.

== Tourist attractions ==
The parish includes two main tourist attractions.

Lea Gardens (also known as Lea Rhododendron Gardens for its extensive collection of this plant) is an open-air landscaped garden, open to the public during the summer months. At its entrance is a small café with indoor and outdoor seating, and a plant shop selling a wide variety of species (only open in summer).

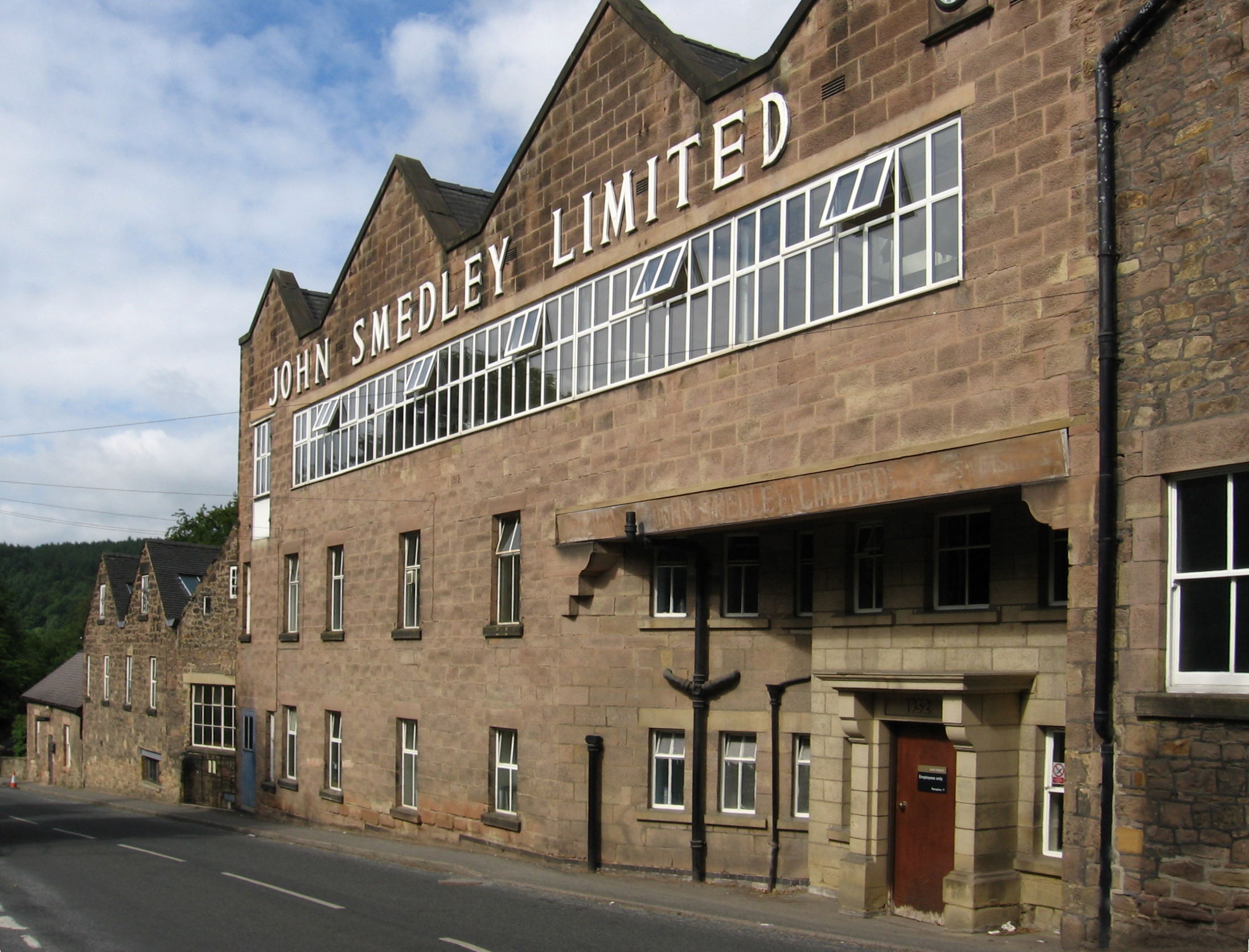
John Smedley's Mill

John Smedley's historic clothing mill retains a factory-outlet shop, selling the clothing that it makes at discount prices.

The Coach House at Lea was formerly a collection of farm buildings, converted to house an ice cream parlour, gift shop, restaurant, tea rooms and a limited amount of guest accommodation. The Coach House was famous for its home-made Jersey ice cream, the Shaw family having made the ice cream in a large range of flavours, but with changes of ownership, it is now a private home.

The parish is also very close to, but not linked with:

- Crich Tramway Village
- Cromford (Including the Mills, Canal and High Peak Trail
- Matlock Bath
- Matlock Garden Centre
- The Groom farm was utilised in the 1978 BBC series production of A Traveller in Time by Alison Uttley. This led Simon Groom, the farmer's son, to a career as a BBC broadcaster and Blue Peter presenter.

== Notable people ==
- Anthony Babington (1561–1586), an English gentleman from Dethick Manor convicted of plotting the assassination of Elizabeth I.
- William Nightingale (1794–1874), a noted Unitarian and father of Florence Nightingale, the founder of modern nursing, born locally
- John Smedley (1803–1874), namesake of John Smedley Ltd, a local clothing brand specialising in knitwear like polo shirts and sweaters
- Florence Nightingale (1820–1910), a social reformer, statistician and the founder of modern nursing; brought up in her family's homes locally and at Embley, Hampshire.

== See also ==
- List of places in Derbyshire
- Listed buildings in Dethick, Lea and Holloway

== Picture gallery ==
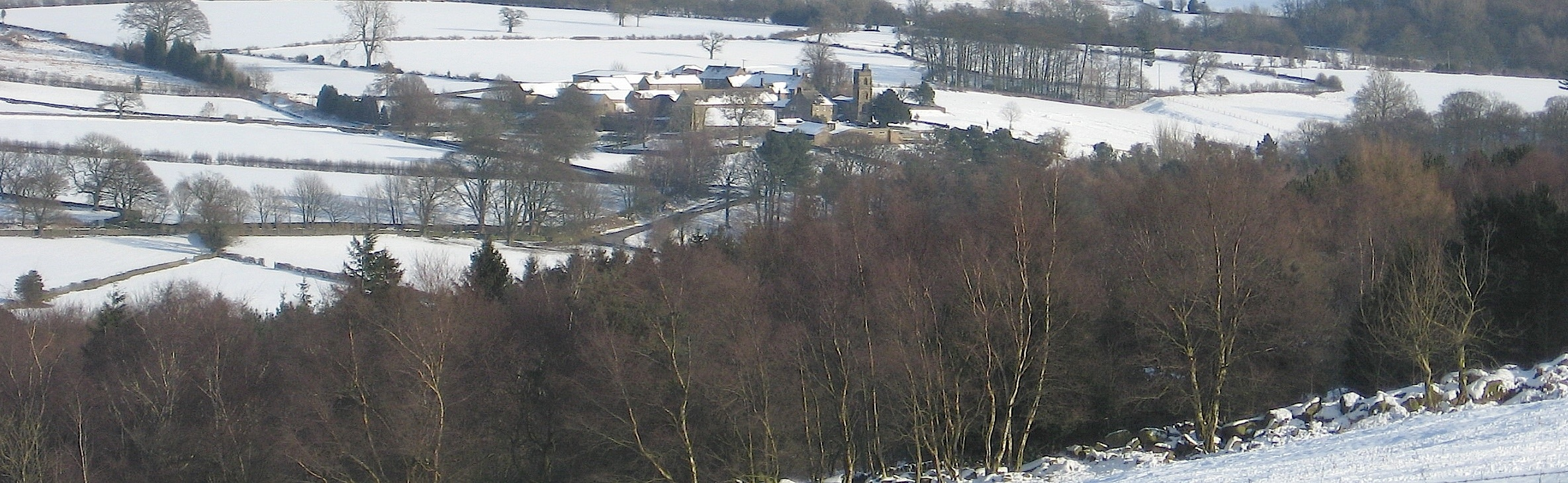
Dethick, from 2.5 miles

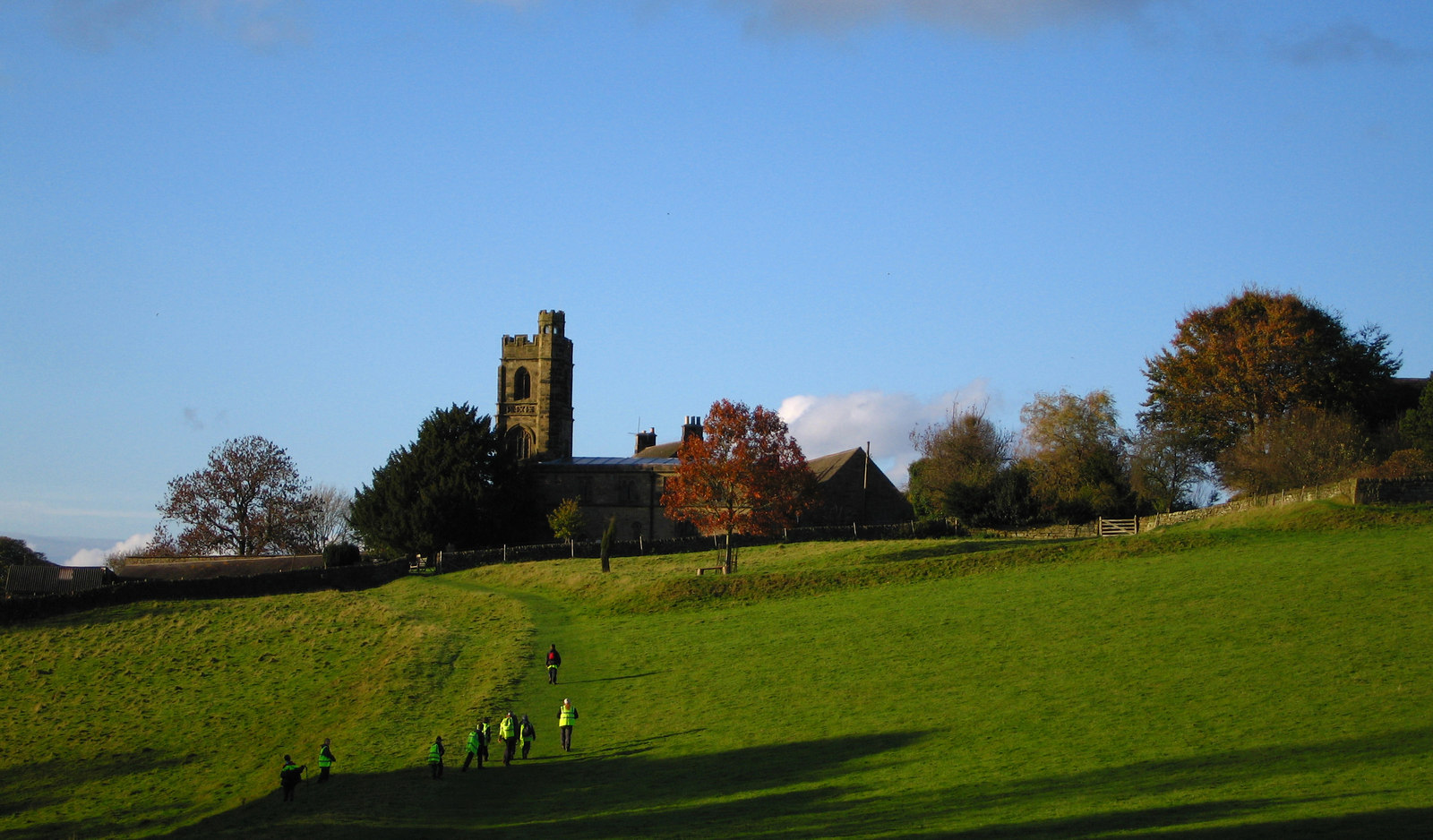
Closer view of Dethick's Church of St. John
