= Percy Heylyn Currey =

English architect

Percy Heylyn Currey FRIBA (November 1864 – 5 March 1942) was an English architect based in Derby.

== Life ==
He was born in November 1864, the son of Benjamin Scott Currey and Helen Heygate. He was educated at Derby School from 1875 to 1883, and he was awarded the Rowland Scholarship in 1878.

He married Augusta Mary Anne Emily Frederieka Leacroft on 26 September 1897 in Little Eaton, Derbyshire.

From 1895, he was diocesan surveyor for the Diocese of Southwell. In 1907, he was made a Fellow of the Royal Institute of British Architects.

From 1903, he was in partnership with Charles Clayton Thompson FRIBA, youngest son of the Rev. Grammer Thompson M.A. of Horsley, Derbyshire, as Currey and Thompson, the firm being chiefly concerned with ecclesiastical work. The firm was dissolved upon Thompson's death in 1932.

== Works ==
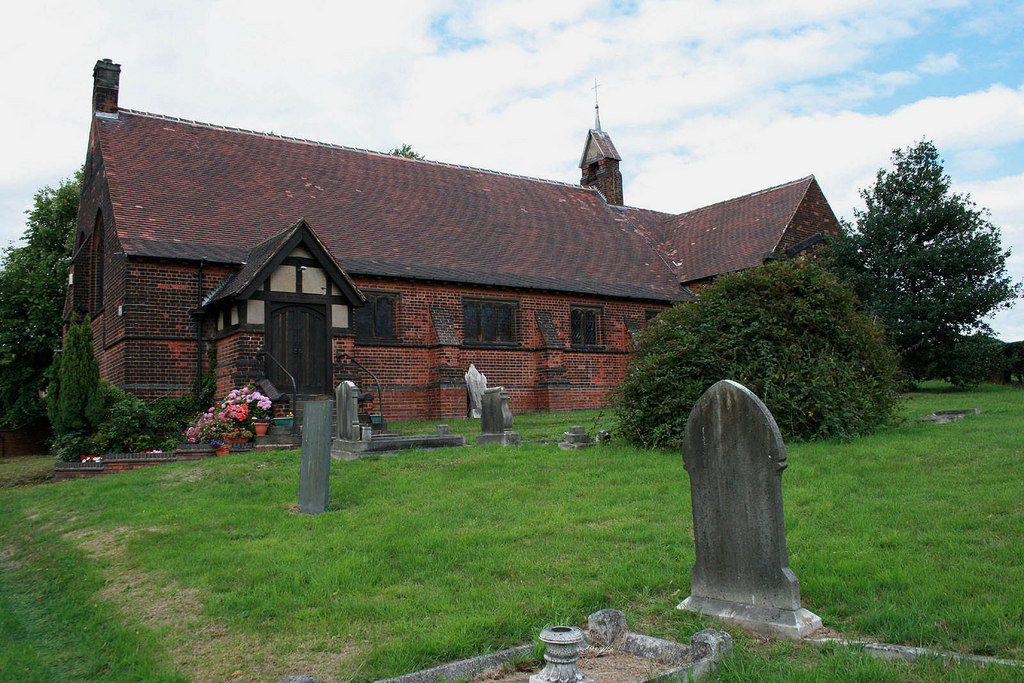
St Mary's Church, Westwood of 1899

Ecclesiastical Works

- St Mary's Church, Ilkeston, 1889 and 1910 alteration/restorations;
- St Stephen's Church, Borrowash, 1890;
- Derby School Chapel, site adjoining St. Helen's House, King Street, Derby, 1891 (Demolished Sept 2017);
- St Luke's Vicarage, 48 Bedford Street, Derby, 1896;
- St Paul's Church, Mansfield Road, Derby, 1897 addition of aisle;
- St Giles' Church, Matlock, 1898 addition of south chapel;
- St. Mary's Church, Westwood, 1899;
- Christ Church, Holloway, Derbyshire, 1903 (tower 1911);
- All Saints' Church, Ashover, 1903 restoration;
- St Osmund's Church, Osmaston-by-Derby, Vicarage and Almshouses, 1904;
- St Mary's Church, Plumtree, 1906 (tower restoration);
- St Peter and St Paul's Church, Eckington 1907 remodelling;
- St Michael and All Angels' Church, Kniveton, 1907 restoration;
- St Helen's Church, Darley Dale, 1908 restoration;
- St John The Baptist Church, Smalley - New Bell Tower 1911;
- St Mary's Church, Crich, 1913 restoration;
- Rose Hill Infants and St James’ Church of England Junior School, 1913;
- St Mary's Church, Buxton, 1915;
- Holy Trinity Church, Milford, War Memorial 1919;
- St Bartholomew's Church, Nightingale Road, Derby, 1927;
- Kelham Hall Chapel, Newark, 1928;
- St Mary's Bridge Chapel, Derby; 1930 restoration;
- St Stephen's Church, Sinfin, 1935.

Other Works

- 28 Loudon Street, Derby 1903 (for Edward Litchford, Midland Railway Chief Accountant)
- Repton House, Church Street, Lea, 1905;
- Fressingfield, 116 Blagreaves Lane, Derby, 1914, extended 1924.
