= John Smedley (brand) =

English luxury clothing brand

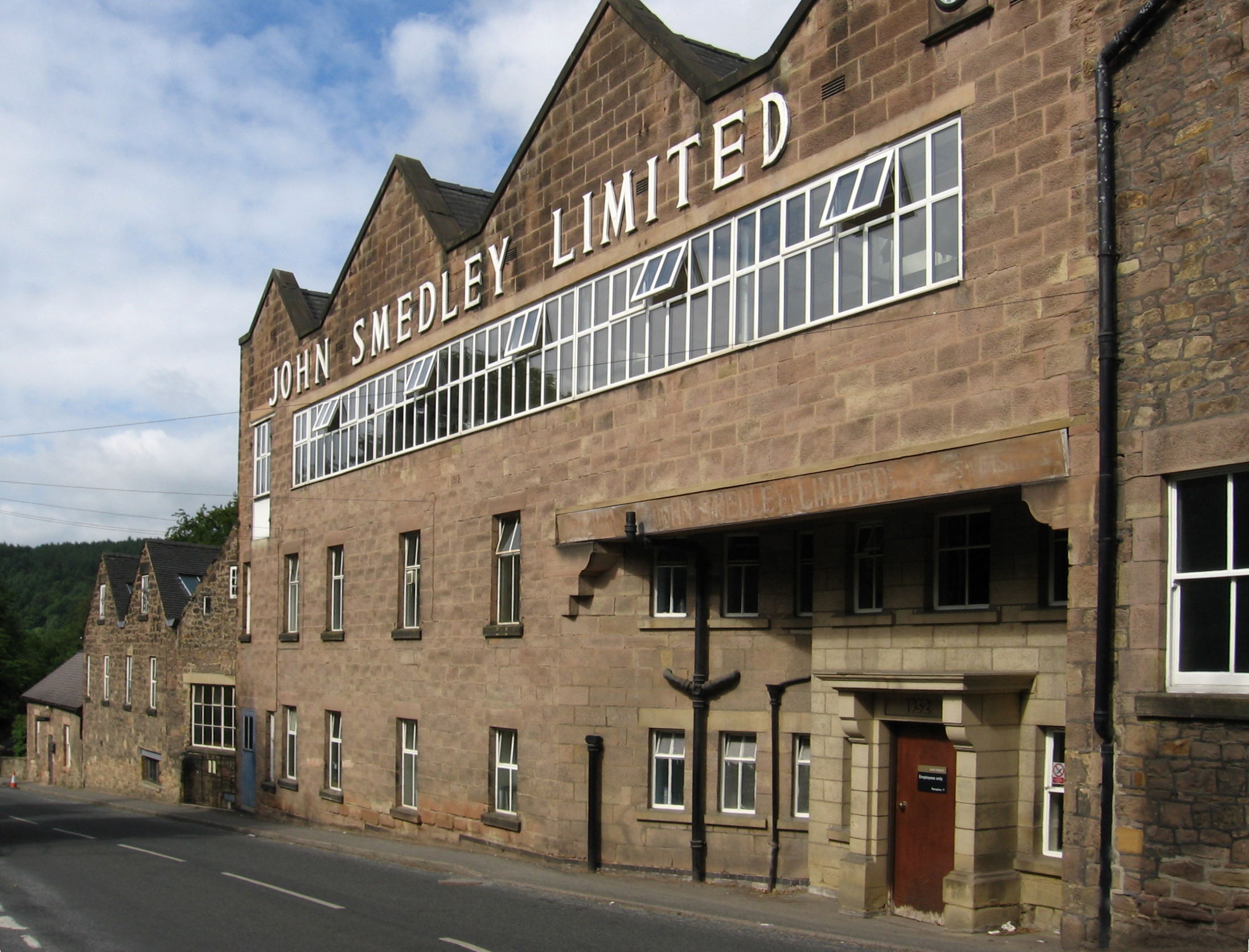
- Type: Private
- Industry: Fashion
- Founded: 1784
- Founder: John Smedley
- Headquarters: Derbyshire
- Number of locations: 3 (2019)
- Key people: Jess McGuire-Dudley (CEO)
- Products: Clothing
- Website: www.johnsmedley.com

John Smedley Ltd is an English luxury clothing brand specialising in knitwear like polo shirts and sweaters for men and women. The company applies a “Made in England” or “Made in the Great Britain” tag to every garment made. John Smedley has remained a family business since 1784, and is now managed by the 8th generation of the Smedley family. Historically, four generations of men named John Smedley owned Lea Mills, near Matlock, Derbyshire. The most famous of these was John Smedley (1803–1874), who is considered the namesake of the brand. The John Smedley company sells clothing in over 30 countries; its largest export market is Japan. In the UK, John Smedley has concessions in branches of Flannels and Fenwick.

== History ==
Lea Mills was founded in 1784 by Peter Nightingale (a relation of Florence Nightingale and former accountant to Richard Arkwright) and John Smedley (father of the better-known son of the same name). It was set up on a hilly site straddling a brook at Lea Bridge, just outside Matlock. The brook was used to both clean yarn and power machinery.

The mill specialised in the production of muslin and spinning cotton to send out to local cottages with hand frame looms. Towards the end of the 18th century, the company had extended its activities to include knitting and hosiery manufacture – said to be the origin of Long Johns. By this time, John Smedley was running the business alone, although the Nightingale family retained an interest in the property.

As Lea Mills remains open and an operational building to this day, manufacturing the company's range of designer knitwear, John Smedley claims to be the world's longest running factory manufacturer.

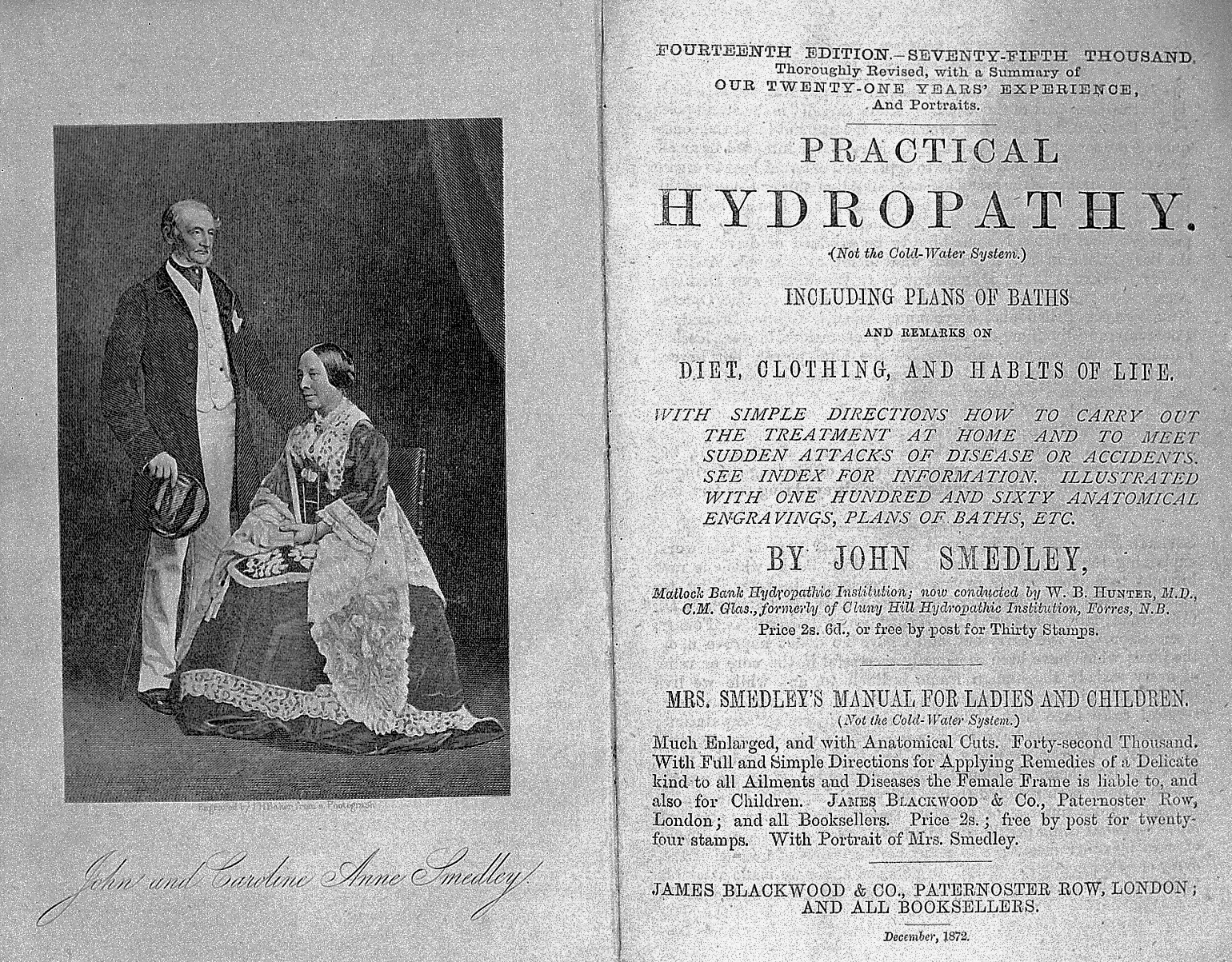
John and Caroline Smedley in their book on hydropathy. Credit: Wellcome Library

John Smedley's son, also named John Smedley, was born on 12 June 1803.

In 1819 the younger John Smedley began work as an apprentice. In 1825 he took over the running of the mill, and started an energetic expansion of its operations. The mill at this time had already diversified from cotton to wool, and from simply weaving to knitting. Smedley the younger's plan was to produce a wide range of finished garments, rather than simply manufacture cloth.

In 1847 he married Caroline Harward, the second daughter of John Harward the Vicar of Wirksworth.

Smedley's success and growing wealth enabled other grand projects. He developed an interest in hydrotherapy, and built Smedley's Hydro in Matlock, a spa resort that attracted patrons from around the world. As a family home he also built the massive and ostentatious Riber Castle on a hilltop overlooking Matlock. This is now one of Derbyshire's most famous landmarks.

Smedley died on 27 July 1874, and upon his death the business passed to his cousin, John T Marsden Smedley, and thence to John B Marsden Smedley. In 1893 the operation became a limited company.

In 2024, the brand received its first Royal Warrant from King Charles III in the year it celebrated its 240th anniversary, and a second from Queen Camilla in 2026.

== See also ==
- List of mills in Derbyshire
