= St John the Baptist's Chapel, Matlock Bath =

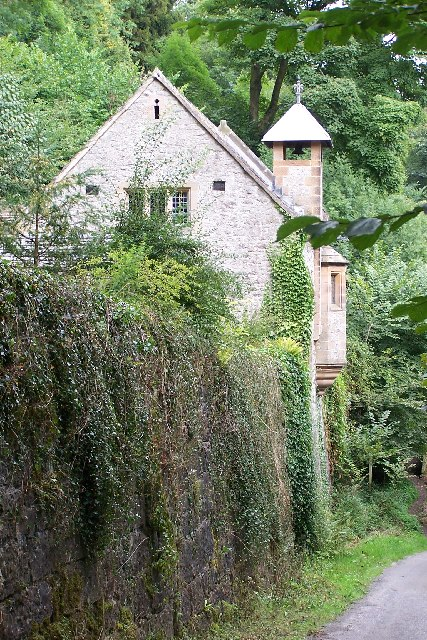
- St John the Baptist's Chapel, Matlock Bath, from the east

- Location in Derbyshire
- 53.1311°N 1.5616°W
- Location: Between Matlock Bath and Matlock, Derbyshire, England
- OS grid reference: SK 294 594

History
- Built: 1897
- Built for: Mrs Louisa Sophia Harris

Site notes
- Architect: Guy Dawber
- Architectural style: Arts and Crafts
- Governing body: Friends of Friendless Churches

Listed Building – Grade II*
- Designated: 26 October 1972
- Reference no.: 1248139

St John the Baptist's Chapel, Matlock Bath, is a former private chapel in St Johns Road, off the A6 road between Matlock Bath and Matlock, Derbyshire, England. The chapel, together with its retaining and attached walls, is recorded in the National Heritage List for England as a designated Grade II* listed building, and is under the care of the Friends of Friendless Churches.

== History ==
The chapel was built in 1897 for Mrs Louisa Sophia Harris, and was designed by Guy Dawber; it was the only church designed by Dawber. Since being declared redundant it has been taken into the care of the charity, the Friends of Friendless Churches, to whom the freehold was conveyed on 15 March 2002. Since taking it over, the charity has arranged repairs, including rebuilding the gates and cleaning and repairing the chandeliers.

== Architecture ==
The chapel is constructed in rubble carboniferous limestone with ashlar gritstone dressings. Its plan consists of a single cell. On its south side is a bell turret with a lead-covered pyramidal roof. Also on the south side is an oriel window with mullioned lights. The chapel is entered through a west doorway in a porch that is continued round the north side to form a covered walkway. The internal fittings are in Arts and Crafts style. The decorated barrel-vaulted plastered ceiling was designed by George Bankart, the stained glass at the east end by Louis Davis, and the painted altarpiece by John Cooke. Dawber designed the perpendicular style rood screen, and probably the pulpit, pews, choir stalls and light fittings.

== See also ==
- Grade II* listed buildings in Derbyshire Dales
- Listed buildings in Matlock Town
