= Brian Barrett =

New Zealand cricketer

Personal information
- Full name: Brian Joseph Barrett
- Born: 16 November 1966 (age 59); Auckland, New Zealand
- Batting: Right-handed
- Bowling: Right-arm fast-medium

Domestic team information
- Years: Team
- 1985: Worcestershire
- 1985/86: Auckland
- 1986/87–1989/90: Northern Districts

Career statistics
Competition	First-class	List A
Matches	31	9
Runs scored	124	16
Batting average	8.85	16.00
100s/50s	0/0	0/0
Top score	25*	6*
Balls bowled	4,250	342
Wickets	73	11
Bowling average	32.26	23.45
5 wickets in innings	0	1
10 wickets in match	0	0
Best bowling	4/32	6/12
Catches/stumpings	4/–	1/–
- Source: CricketArchive, 15 November 2008

Brian Joseph Barrett (born 16 November 1966) is a former New Zealand first-class cricketer who played for Auckland, Northern Districts and Worcestershire, also playing List A games for Northern Districts and Worcestershire and appearing at Youth Test and Youth One-day International level for his country. He was part of the New Zealand team that toured England in 1986, but never played a Test or ODI.

Barrett's first-class debut came for Worcestershire against Cambridge University in June 1985; in a drawn match in which little play was possible, he took the single wicket of Shaun Gorman and did not bat. He only ever made one further first-team appearance for the county, when he took 0–43 in eight overs and scored 5 not out against Gloucestershire in a John Player League match at Moreton-in-Marsh near the end of the season.

Returning to New Zealand, he appeared three times for Auckland in the 1985-86 Shell Trophy, collecting five wickets in his first game against Canterbury; he then played several times for New Zealand Young Cricketers against their touring Australian counterparts, making five Youth Test and two Youth ODI appearances, although without any startling success. Back in England for 1986, he was unable to break into the Worcestershire first team, but in July and August he turned out a number of times for the touring New Zealanders, though without gaining any international honours or indeed more than three wickets in any innings. He also accompanied his country to the Netherlands for two minor games.

Barrett moved from Auckland to Northern Districts for the 1986–87 season, and in a Shell Cup game against Otago in late December 1986 recorded by far his best innings figures in any top-class match, claiming 6-12 from ten overs. This was the first (and, as of 2008, remains the only) time that a Northern Districts player had taken six wickets in a List A innings. However, it was not quite enough: Otago won the match by one wicket. More home Youth internationals against the Australians followed later that season, although again without any eye-catching figures.

He played on for Northern Districts for a couple more seasons, several times taking four wickets in a first-class innings but never managing to go one better. His career-best innings return in the longer game was 4-32, achieved against his old club of Auckland in February 1989, although his accomplishment was somewhat overshadowed by the 18-year-old Chris Cairns' maiden first-class century, rather eclipsing his previous personal best of 32!

Barrett played only one match in the 1989–90 season, and his career ended unsuccessfully with no wickets against Wellington.
