= Church of St Leonard, Lower Lemington =

Church in Gloucestershire, England

Coordinates: 52.0088°N 1.6824°W

Church of St Leonard
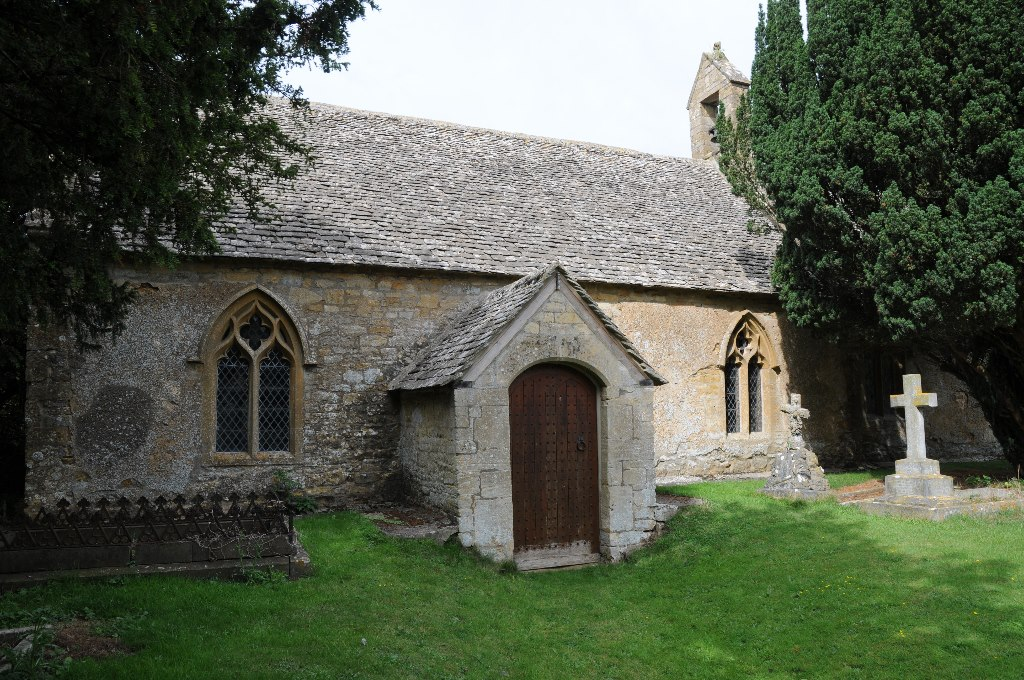

- Denomination: Church of England

Architecture
- Heritage designation: Grade I listed building
- Designated: 25 August 1960

Administration
- Province: Canterbury
- Diocese: Gloucester
- Parish: Batsford

The Anglican Church of St Leonard at Lower Lemington in the parish of Batsford in the Cotswold District of Gloucestershire, England, was built in the 12th century. It is a grade I listed building.

== History ==
Parts of the nave of the church, including the nave were built in the 12th century, although there may have been a church on the site in the 11th. The chancel is Early English and the porch and vestry are from the 19th century.

Until the dissolution of the monasteries the church belonged to Tewkesbury Abbey. The fabric of the chancel was damaged during the English Civil War.

The parish is part of the Moreton-in-Marsh benefice within the Diocese of Gloucester.

== Architecture ==
The limestone building has stone slate roofs. The floors are flagstone. It consists of the nave, which is supported by buttresses, chancel, porch and vestry. Above the roof of the chancel is a bellcote. The 12th century doorway which used to open to the outside is now the entrance to the vestry. Some of the stained glass is by Joseph Edward Nuttgens.

The furnishings include a 12th-century font. Above the chancel arch are the arms of George III erected to commemorate the Battle of Waterloo.
