= Lower Lemington =

Village in Gloucestershire, England

Coordinates: 52.004°N 1.702°W

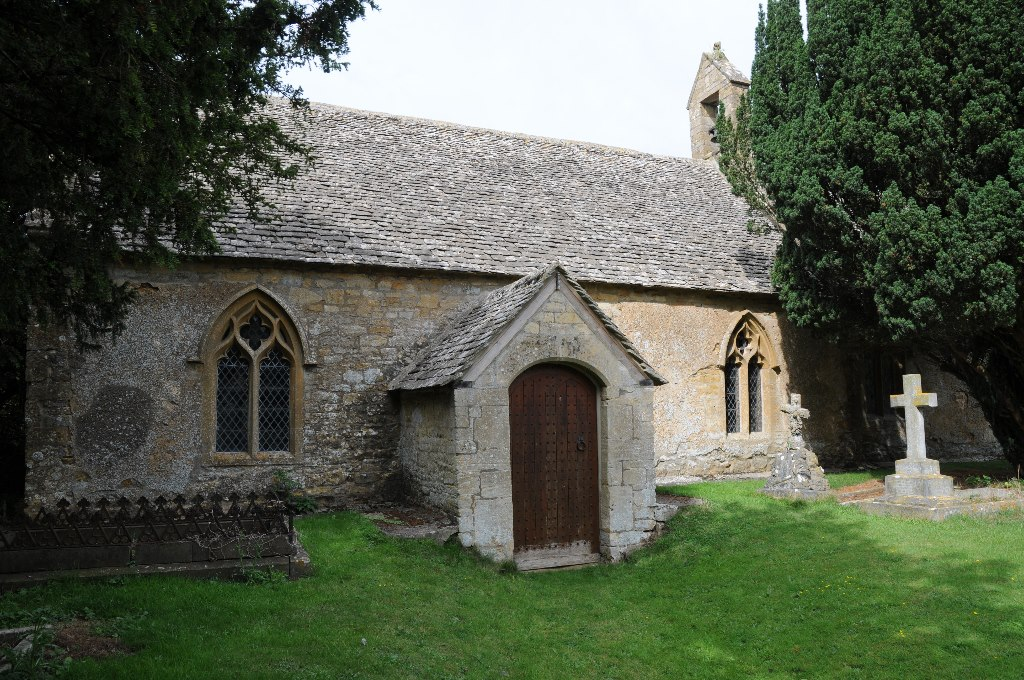
- Church of St Leonard

- Location within Gloucestershire
- OS grid reference: SP218344
- Civil parish: Batsford
- District: Cotswold
- Shire county: Gloucestershire
- Region: South West
- Country: England
- Sovereign state: United Kingdom
- Post town: Moreton-in-Marsh
- Postcode district: GL56
- Dialling code: 01386
- Police: Gloucestershire
- Fire: Gloucestershire
- Ambulance: South Western
- UK Parliament: North Cotswolds

Lower Lemington is a small village and former civil parish, now in the parish of Batsford, in the Cotswold district of Gloucestershire, England. The village is about 2 miles (3 km) north-east of Moreton-in-Marsh.

Lower Lemington lies east of the Fosse Way, and west of a small stream which may have been called the Leam and may have given its name to the place.

There was a settlement here in Saxon times, and the place was recorded in the Domesday Book of 1086 as Lemingtune, when it was in the possession of Tewkesbury Abbey. The village continued to be known as Lemington until the 16th century. A distinction was then made between Lower Lemington and Upper Lemington: the two places were effectively a single village but with different manorial holdings and land ownership. Lower Lemington, held by Tewkesbury Abbey, was a separate manor and parish. Upper Lemington, about 300 metres to the east, was a manor held by Westminster Abbey and was included in the parish of Todenham. By the 20th century the name Upper Lemington had fallen out of use.

The church of St Leonard was built in the 12th century. It is now a Grade I listed building.

Lower Lemington became a civil parish in 1866. By 1931 the population of the parish was only 50. On 1 April 1935 the civil parish was abolished and merged into the civil parish of Batsford.
