= Arthur Conway (sportsman) =

English cricketer

Personal information
- Full name: Arthur Joseph Conway
- Born: 1 April 1885; Stirchley, Worcestershire, England
- Died: 29 October 1954 (aged 69); South Shore, Blackpool, England
- Batting: Right-handed
- Bowling: Right-arm fast

Domestic team information
- Years: Team
- 1910–1919: Worcestershire

Career statistics
Competition	FC
Matches	31
Runs scored	165
Batting average	4.34
100s/50s	0/0
Top score	20*
Balls bowled	3,084
Wickets	57
Bowling average	35.75
5 wickets in innings	2
10 wickets in match	1
Best bowling	9/38
Catches/stumpings	6/0
- Source: CricketArchive, 9 March 2009

Arthur Joseph Conway (1 April 1885 – 29 October 1954) was an English cricketer: a right-handed batsman and right-arm fast bowler (although his Wisden obituary says merely "rather more than medium pace") who played 29 times for Worcestershire (and twice for HK Foster's XI) between 1910 and 1919.

Conway took 54 wickets in his first-class career, of which 15 came in a single match in June 1914: playing for Worcestershire against Gloucestershire at Moreton-in-Marsh, he took 9/38 in the first innings and 6/49 in the second for match figures of 15/87; as of March 2009 this remains the best match analysis for the county.

A poor batsman, Conway scored just 165 runs in 52 innings (batting average 4.34), with a highest score of only 20 not out. He acted as Scorer at least once, for Worcestershire's game against Warwickshire at Dudley in 1913. On this occasion the other scorer was Chicko Austin, who scored in almost 500 first-class games.

Conway also played football for Aston Villa and Wolves.

He was born in Stirchley, which at that time lay in Worcestershire; he died at the age of 69 in South Shore, Blackpool, Lancashire.
