= Redesdale Hall =

Municipal building in Moreton-in-Marsh, Gloucestershire, England

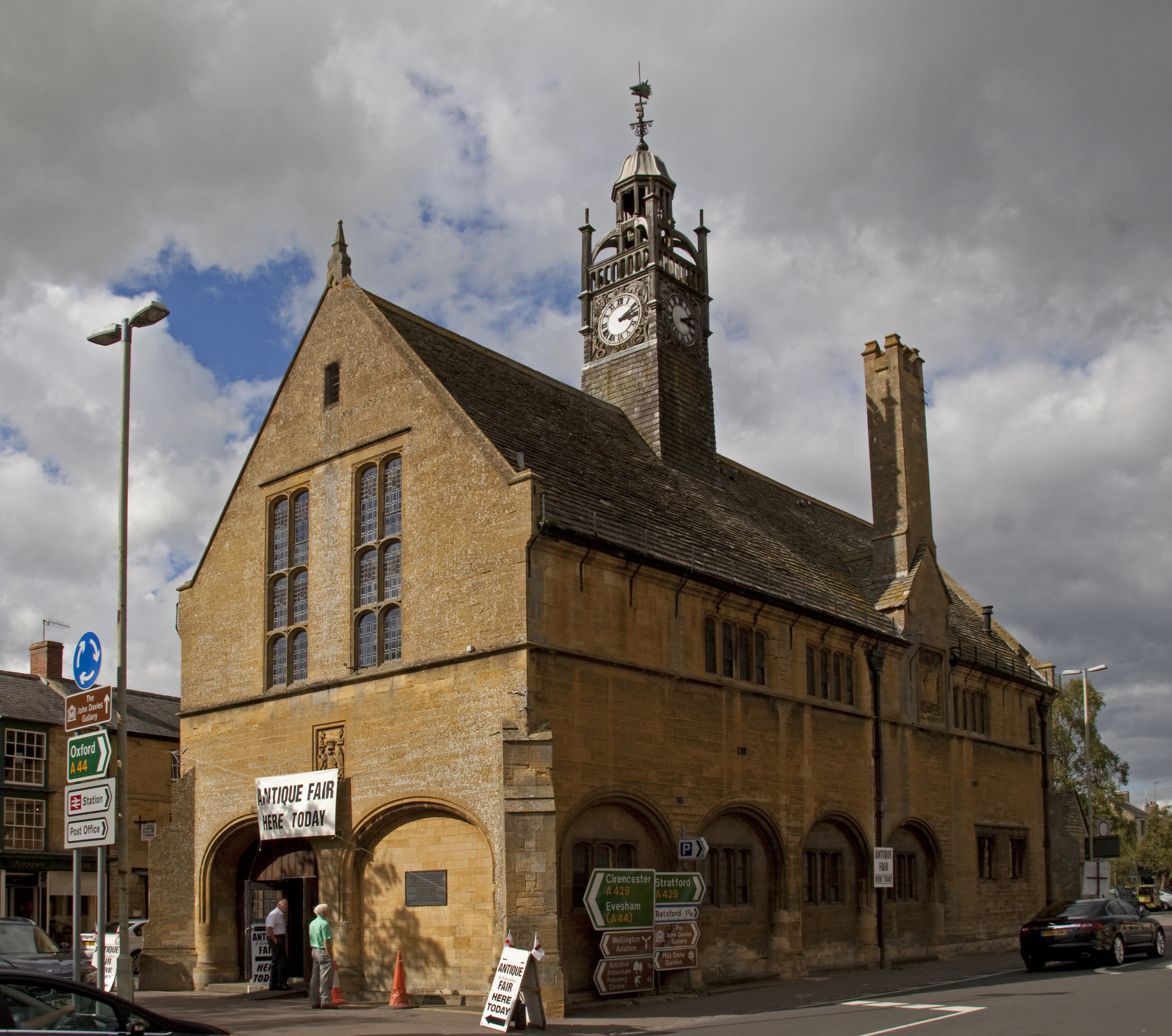
- Redesdale Hall

- Shown in Gloucestershire
- 51.9900°N 1.7033°W
- Location: High Street, Moreton-in-Marsh

History
- Built: 1887

Site notes
- Architect(s): Sir Ernest George and Harold Peto
- Architectural style: Free Tudor style

Listed Building – Grade II
- Official name: Redesdale Hall (Town Hall), High Street
- Designated: 25 August 1960
- Reference no.: 1088683

Redesdale Hall, also referred to as Moreton-in-Marsh Town Hall, is a municipal building in the High Street, Moreton-in-Marsh, Gloucestershire, England. The building, which is used as an events venue, is a Grade II listed building.

== History ==
The opportunity to replace an old 18th century market hall, which had become dilapidated, arose following the death of the writer of religious polemics, John Freeman-Mitford, 1st Earl of Redesdale, in 1886. The earl, who had died unmarried, left all his estates to his distant cousin, Bertram Freeman-Mitford, who duly became lord of the manor and decided to erect a new building, in memory of his generous cousin, for benefit of the inhabitants of the town. It was designed by Sir Ernest George and Harold Peto in the Free Tudor style, built by Peto Brothers of Pimlico in ashlar stone and was officially opened by the Minister without Portfolio, Sir Michael Hicks Beach, on 2 December 1887.

The design involved a near-symmetrical main frontage with six bays facing east down Oxford Street; the ground floor was arcaded, although never used as a market hall as such. On the first floor, the first bay was blind; the second, third and fifth bays were fenestrated by four-light mullioned windows; the fourth bay featured a sundial which was surmounted by a chimney stack, while the sixth bay was fenestrated by a single mullioned window. The south elevation featured a panel containing the Redesdale coat of arms. The north and south elevations were fenestrated by pairs of two-light mullioned windows, reaching up into the gables, while the west elevation was fenestrated by a series of four-light mullioned windows. There were buttresses at the corners of the building and, at roof level, there was a square clock tower surmounted by a crown steeple. Internally, the principal room was the assembly hall on the first floor with featured stained glass windows depicting the coats of arms of Bertram Freeman-Mitford and his wife, Clementina.

Freeman-Mitford was raised to the peerage as Baron Redesdale in 1902 and, shortly after his death in 1916, his estates, which included Redesdale Hall, were acquired by Gilbert Wills, 1st Baron Dulverton. Following the implementation of the Local Government Act 1929, four local districts were amalgamated to form North Cotswold Rural District Council in 1935 and the new council established its offices in a building on the east side of the High Street. Dulverton presented Redesdale Hall, which was located just 70 yards (64 m) to the south of the council offices, to North Cotswold Rural District Council for use as a town hall in 1951. The council initiated the infilling of the arches, to maximise use of the building, in 1952.

In April 1972, the singer, pianist and composer, Elton John, used the building as the venue for the launch of his new label, The Rocket Record Company. He took the opportunity of the visit to the town to buy a depiction of Redesdale Hall, which had been painted by the artist, L. S. Lowry, in the 1940s. Following local government reorganisation in April 1974, the enlarged Cotswold District Council gave the building to Moreton-in-Marsh Parish Council in September 1974. The parish council, which became known as Moreton-in-Marsh Town Council, continued to use the building for large civic meetings. During the flooding in Gloucestershire in 2007, the building was used as a management centre for the administration of emergency shelter for local people.
