= Dorn, Gloucestershire =

Hamlet in Gloucestershire, England

Coordinates: 52.004°N 1.702°W

Dorn
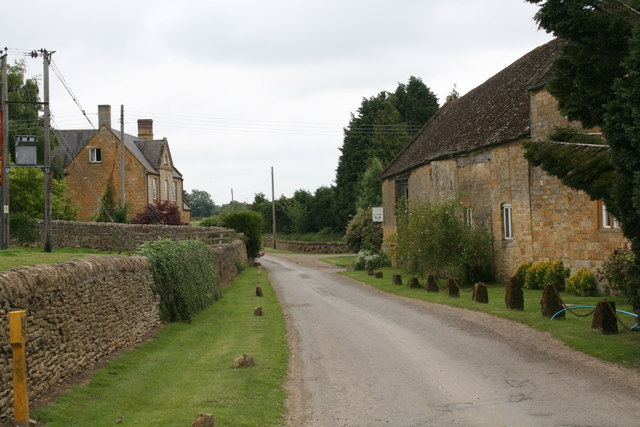

- Location within Gloucestershire
- OS grid reference: SP206340
- Civil parish: Batsford
- District: Cotswold
- Shire county: Gloucestershire
- Region: South West
- Country: England
- Sovereign state: United Kingdom
- Post town: Moreton-in-Marsh
- Postcode district: GL56
- Dialling code: 01386
- Police: Gloucestershire
- Fire: Gloucestershire
- Ambulance: South Western
- UK Parliament: North Cotswolds

Dorn is a hamlet in the Cotswold district of Gloucestershire, England. It is about 1 mile north of Moreton-in-Marsh.

Dorn lies on the west side of the Fosse Way, and there was a small Roman town here. The Roman site was the largest of five defended small towns on the line of the Fosse Way between Cirencester and Lincoln. It is the site of the annual Moreton-in-Marsh Agricultural Show, held on the first Saturday in September on part of the site of the Roman town. The railway line to Worcester runs alongside the show ground, and at Dorn reaches the highest point between Oxford and Worcester. This is also the Thames/Severn watershed.

Dorn was one of the lands mentioned in King Edgar's Charter to the church at Worcester in 972. It was apparently included in the manor of Blockley in 1086, and became part of the parish of Blockley and therefore part of Worcestershire until 1931, when Blockley was transferred to Gloucestershire. In 1935 Dorn was transferred from the civil parish of Blockley to the civil parish of Batsford.
