= Advenza Freight =

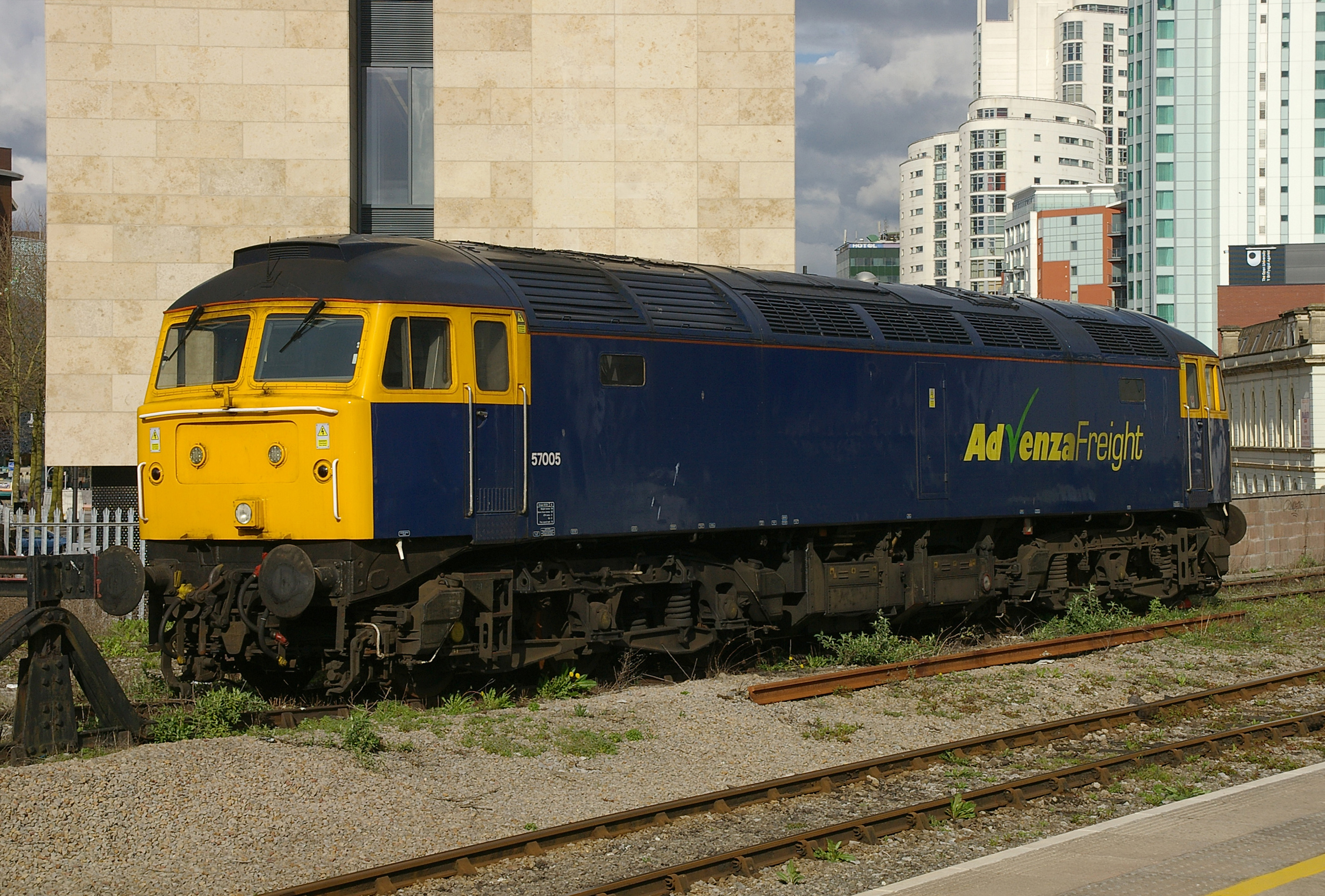
- 57005 at Cardiff Central railway station
- Industry: Rail freight
- Founded: 8 February 2001
- Founder: Tony Hagon
- Defunct: 7 October 2009
- Fate: Wound up
- Parent: Cotswold Rail
- Website: www.advenzafreight.com

Advenza Freight was an English rail freight company based in Gloucester. It was part of the Cotswold Rail group. The company was wound up in October 2009.

== History ==
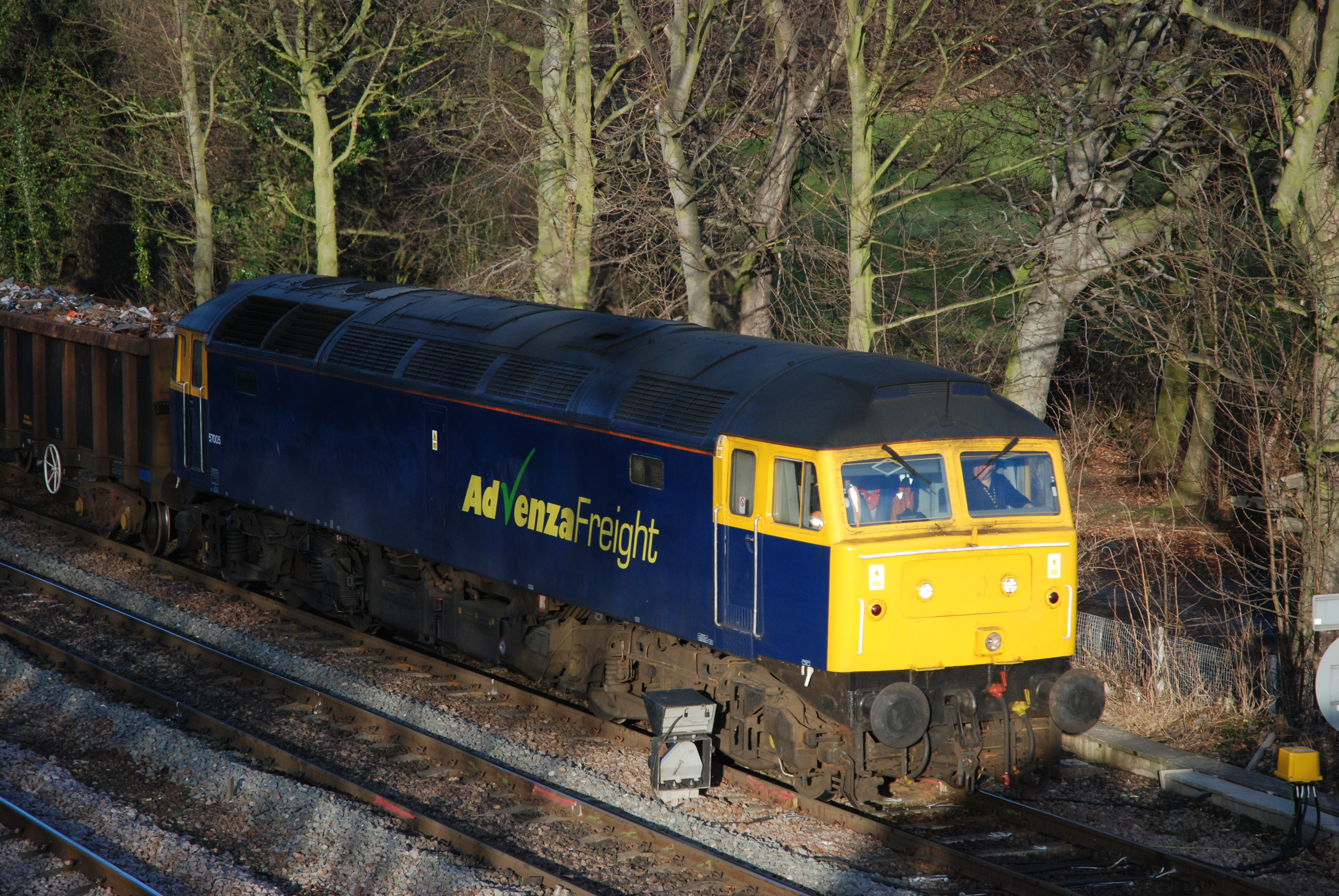
57005 in Chesterfield in January 2009

Advenza Freight was founded in 2001. It obtained a safety case in 2002 and a licence to operate from the Rail Regulator on 16 November 2003. (Note: Licences to operate trains were extended by supplemental agreements for both passenger and freight work until the company became defunct.)

The company initially sought guarantees from Network Rail on timing and regularity of train paths, but was only able to obtain permission to "spot bid" for free train paths, and so was unable reliably to secure paths for its trains to be able to commence commercially viable operations. Both types of right have restrictive flex provisions for Network Rail and stipulate a maximum turn round time. It then sought guarantees from Network Rail through the Office of Rail Regulation regarding the provision of paths for its trains, in January 2004, it reached agreement with Network Rail, and was to start running containerised palletised freight from London (Barking) to Glasgow.

Advenza was scheduled to commence operating between Barking, Essex (Roadways Limited's sidings) and Deanside Glasgow (John G Russell) in April 2004, using trains of containers which would be trans-shipped from rail to the respective operator depots to tranship pallet load freight. This was using three cycles a week, north bound Monday-Wednesday-Friday, and southbound Tuesday-Thursday-Saturday. However, due to uncertainties with the provision of locomotives and the fact that the supporting systems were not yet in place even though all the drivers had been route-trained, the launch was postponed.

Following negotiations with other train operators to provide rolling stock and traction, refinancing of the company introducing new investors, completion of the IT systems, further training of the drivers, and being able to obtain fixed paths from Network Rail, the "FreightBus" service commenced operations now between Willesden, London and Mossend, Glasgow on 25 October 2004. This was a nightly service in both directions, operating as the UK's only Class 1 freight service at the time, hauled by EWS Class 90 electric locomotives operating up to 110 mph. The north and south bound services were timed to meet at Preston where the train crews would change over. For the three weeks that the service was in operation, only one train was late on arrival.

However the turn up and go pallet service fully backed by an on-line booking system failed to attract sufficient customers and so was closed, and the company put up for sale.

In 2005 Cotswold Rail acquired Advenza primarily for its safety case. In 2006 Advenza gained permission to operate passenger trains on the UK network.

As well as operating locomotives for Cotswold Rail's passenger charters, the company undertook transport of rolling stock, as well as operating several scrap metal trains including workings from Stockton on Tees to Cardiff, and Shipley, and from Hitchin to Sheerness; the company having begun leasing 102t GLW box wagons from VTG in 2008. A fly ash train from West Burton Power Station to Tilbury was operated briefly, starting on 2 June 2009.

The company was wound up on 7 October 2009 after an application by HM Revenue & Customs over unpaid taxes.

== Fleet ==
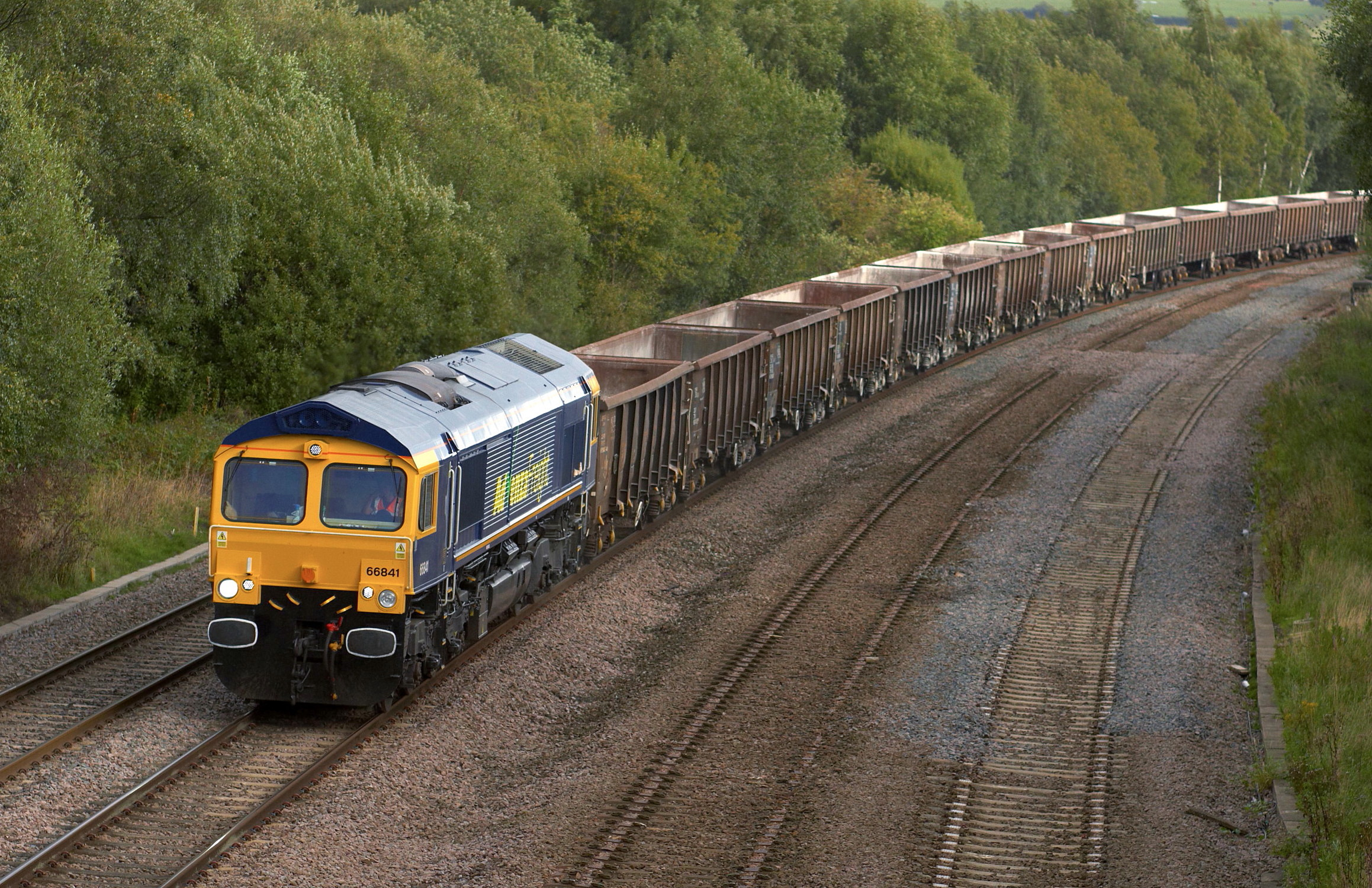
Advenza Freight class 66

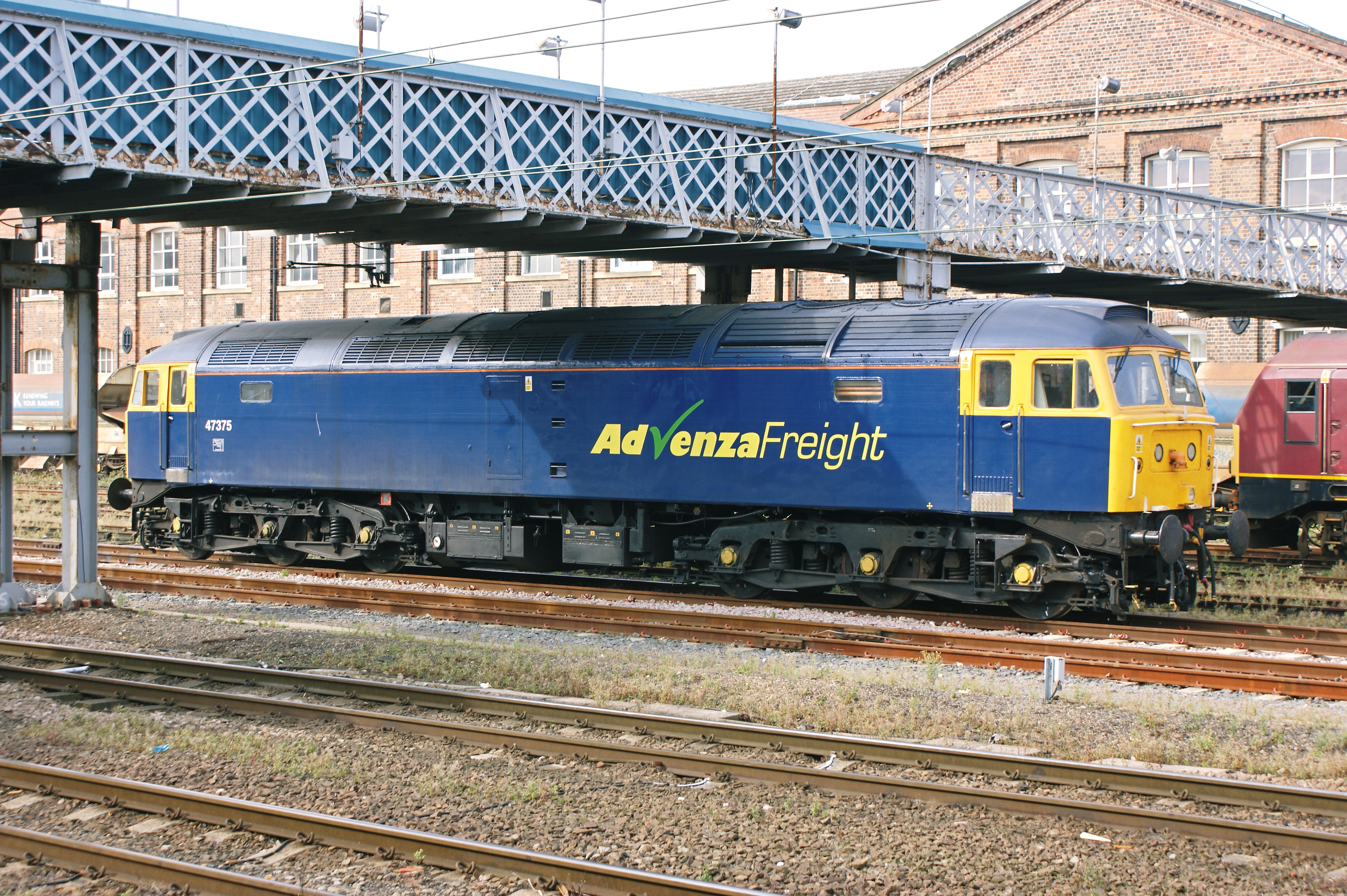
Advenza freight class 47

Advenza operated two Class 47s (47237 and 47375), two Class 57s (57005 and 57006), and four Class 66s (66841 - 66844). The Class 66 locomotives were acquired in the summer of 2009, shortly before the company ceased business, and 66843 is thought to have not have been used in revenue service.

The company also leased other locomotive types including Class 20s, and operated trains for Cotswold Rail using its passenger train operating licence.
