= British Rail Class 57 =

Class of diesel-electric locomotives

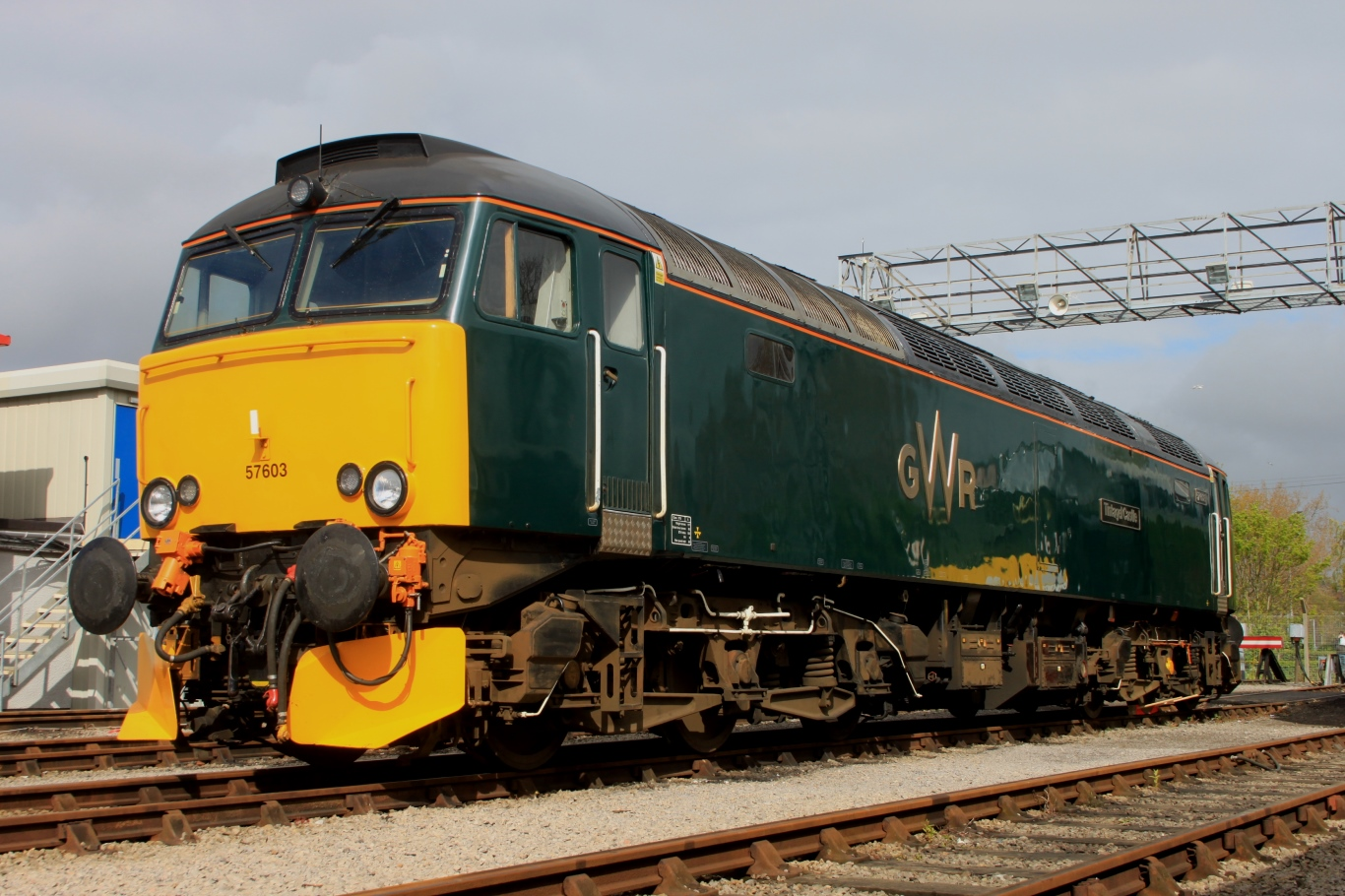
- A Great Western Railway class 57 in 2016
Type and origin
- Power type: Diesel-electric
- Builder: Brush Traction; British Rail Crewe Works
- Build date: 1964–1967
- Rebuilder: Brush Traction
- Rebuild date: 1998–2004
- Number rebuilt: 33
Specifications
- Configuration
  - UIC: Co′Co′
  - Commonwealth: Co-Co
- Gauge: 1,435 mm (4 ft 8 1/2 in)
- Length: 19.38 metres (63 ft 7 in)
- Width: 2.79 metres (9 ft 2 in)
- Loco weight: 57/0 & 57601: 120.6 tonnes (119 long tons; 133 short tons); 57/3 & 57602–57605: 117 tonnes (115 long tons; 129 short tons)
- Fuel type: Diesel
- Fuel capacity: 57/0: 5,550 L (1,220 imp gal; 1,470 US gal); 57/3 & 57/6: 5,887 L (1,295 imp gal; 1,555 US gal)
- Prime mover: EMD 12-645; 57/0 & 57601: 12-645E3; 57/3 & 57602–57605: 12-645F3B
- Engine type: two-stroke V12 diesel
- Displacement: 10.57 L (645 in^{3}) per cylinder
- Cylinders: 12
- MU working: Yes
- Train heating: Electric Train Supply; 57/0: Not equipped 57601: index 95; 57/3 & 57602–57605: index 100
- Loco brake: Air
Performance figures
- Maximum speed: 57/0: 75 mph (121 km/h); 57/3 & 57/6: 95 mph (153 km/h)
- Power output: Engine: 2,300 hp (1,700 kW) 57/0 & 57601; Engine: 2,800 hp (2,100 kW) 57/3 & 57602-57605
- Brakeforce: 57/0: 80 long tons-force (797 kN); 57/3 & 57/6: 60 long tons-force (598 kN)
Career
- Operators: Direct Rail Services; GB Railfreight; Great Western Railway; Locomotive Services Limited; West Coast Railways
- Number in class: 33
- Numbers: 57001–57012; 57301–57316; 57601–57605
- Nicknames: Thunderbirds; Bodysnatchers; Zombies
- First run: 1999
- Disposition: 32 in service, 1 scrapped

The British Rail Class 57 is a type of diesel locomotive that was remanufactured from Class 47s by Brush Traction of Loughborough between 1998 and 2004.

The Class 57 was produced in response to an order placed in November 1997 by the recently privatised freight operator Freightliner. The company sought to have its ageing Class 47s rebuilt, some of which had become increasingly unreliable and uncompetitive in comparison to new-build counterparts. Accordingly, redundant locomotives were handed over to Brush, where they were fitted with re-conditioned Electro-Motive Diesel (EMD) engines and the same model of traction alternator as that fitted to the Class 56 heavy freight locomotive. As a result of this scheme, improved reliability and performance was recorded; Freightliner placed multiple follow-on orders for more to be rebuilt, as would other operators. However, Freightliner abandoned its long-term plans to acquire 25 further Class 57 locomotives in favour of new-built Class 66 locomotives instead.

There are three variants of the Class 57, one designed for freight traffic (57/0) and two to perform passenger operations. During April 2002, Virgin Trains West Coast signed a deal with the rolling stock lessor Porterbrook for the rebuilding of 12 Class 47s into Class 57/3s to conduct rescue duties as well as to haul electric trains along routes that lacked overhead wires to power them directly; further examples would be later ordered to expand Virgin's fleet. The company named its Class 57 locomotives after characters and vehicles from Thunderbirds. Other passenger train operators that used the type included Arriva Trains Wales and Great Western Railway. Various freight haulage firms, and mixed traffic operators, opted to procure Class 57 locomotives as well; these include Direct Rail Services, Rail Operations Group, Advenza Freight, and Colas Rail; many of these obtained units as a result of Freightliner having made its own fleet redundant after procuring new-build locomotives.

== Background ==
The Class 57 is a re-engineered diesel locomotive that was rebuilt from redundant Class 47 locomotives by Brush Traction at their Loughborough facility. The locomotives are fitted with a refurbished Electro-Motive Diesel (EMD) engine and a re-conditioned alternator, improving reliability and performance. There are three variants of the Class 57, one designed for freight traffic (57/0) and two to perform passenger operations. Each locomotive reportedly cost £300,000, about one-third that of a new-build locomotive.

The origins of the Class 57 can be traced back to an order placed in November 1997 by the recently privatised freight operator Freightliner for an initial batch of six locomotives. In 1999, the rebuilding of a further six locomotives were ordered for a total of 12 Class 57/0 freight locomotives. Additionally, five locomotives of the Class 57/6 variant were produced between 2000 and 2003, while 12 Class 57/3 locomotives were ordered during 2002, and extended to cover four more units in 2003, making a total of 21 passenger units. During 2001, a single prototype Class 57/0 was converted with electric train heating for the purpose of garnering orders from passenger train operating companies.

== Current operators ==
=== GB Railfreight ===
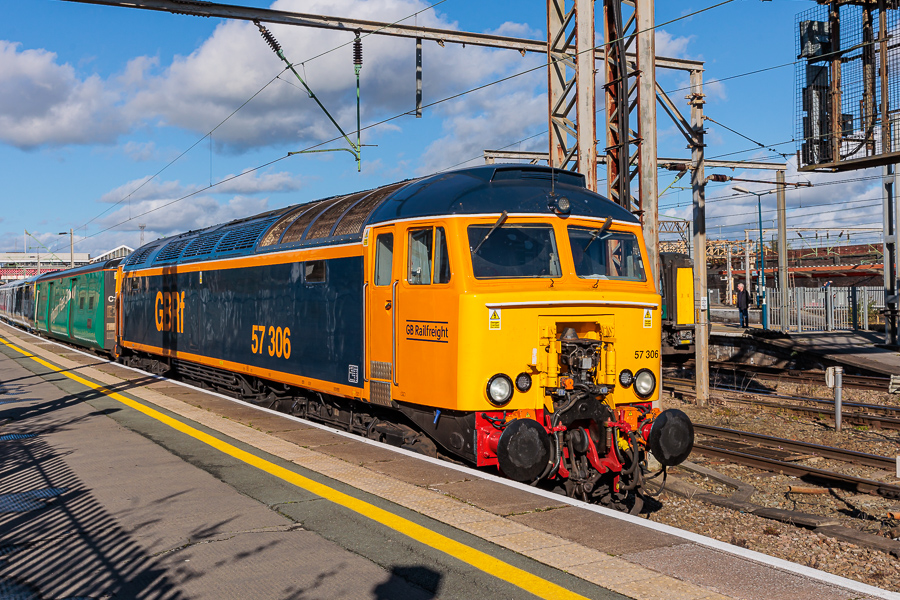
GBRf Class 57 57306 at Crewe, 2024

In June 2023, GB Railfreight began leases on 57301, 57303, 57305, 57306 and 57310. They are used for Multiple Unit transfers, and have also operated as the power for passenger charter trains.

=== Great Western Railway ===
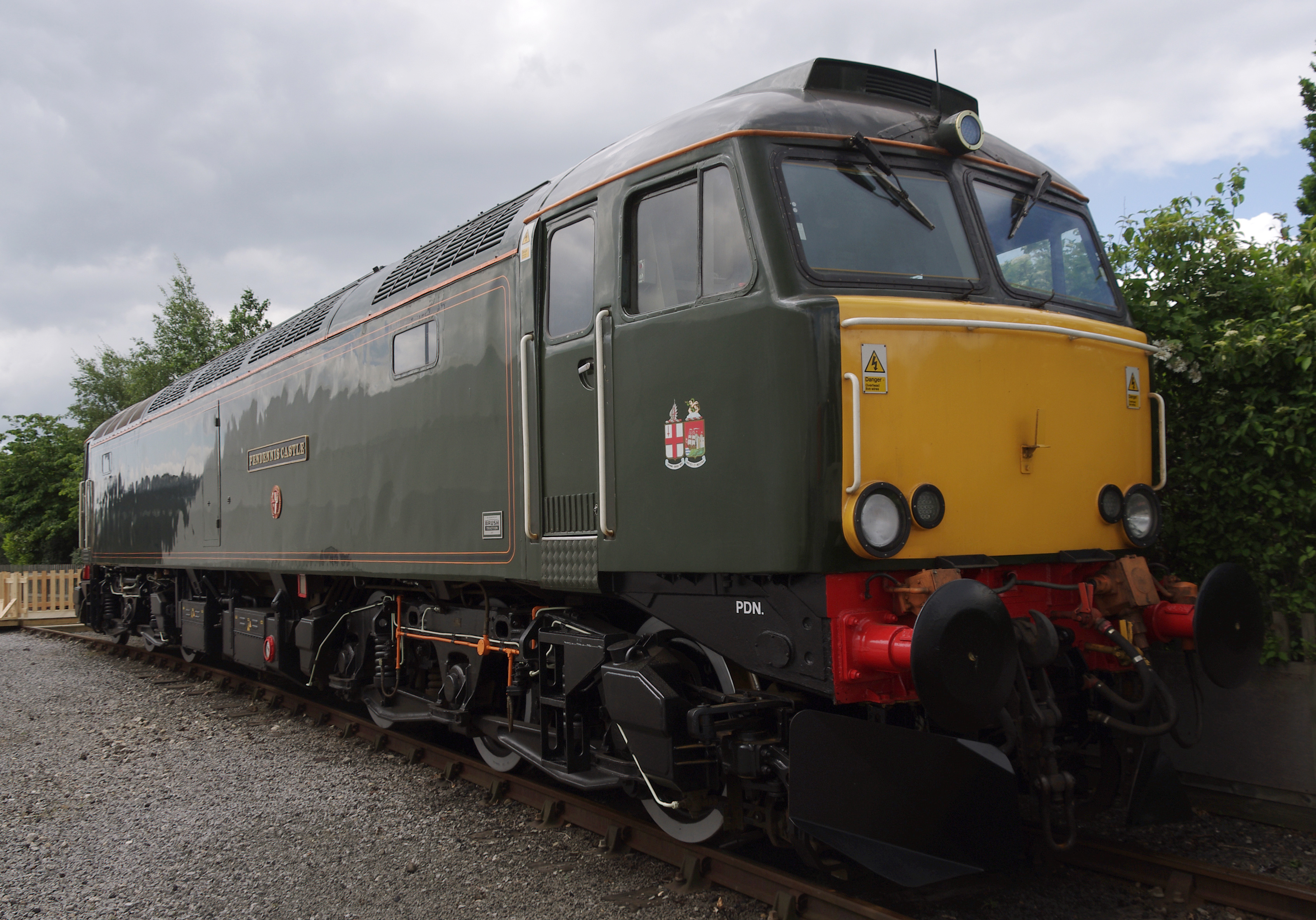
Great Western Railway 57604 at the National Railway Museum

During 2000, the rail leasing company Porterbrook placed an order for a prototype passenger locomotive fitted with electric train heating. During June 2001, this locomotive, 57601, was leased to the passenger train operator First Great Western, At the time, First Great Western were reportedly searching for a suitable replacement for its elderly Class 47 locomotives. 57601 hauled Mark 2 stock on day services from London Paddington to Plymouth and Penzance—until these services ceased in September 2002—and on the Night Riviera sleeper service. After an evaluation period, First Great Western agreed to lease three production Class 57/6s from Porterbrook in May 2002, the first of which being delivered during November 2003. As the prototype locomotive was non-standard, it was decided to order a fourth Class 57/6 in 2003 and return 57601 to Porterbrook; this occurred in December 2003 after the first production Class 57/6 was delivered, after which 57601 was sold by Porterbrook to the spot-hire company West Coast Railways. In mid-2015, First Great Western stated it had plans to obtain one more Class 57, but that the sub-class and number of which had not yet been confirmed.

The First Great Western fleet were originally painted green with a gold bodyside band to match the Night Riviera stock, with cast name and numberplates. All four locomotives were named after castles in Devon and Cornwall, and operate mainly on the Night Riviera sleeper service, with the occasional stock move. From March 2008, the fleet started to receive First Great Western blue livery, with 57605 the first repainted. During June 2010, 57604 received a repaint into lined Brunswick green livery, to commemorate the 175th anniversary of the Great Western Railway. Between December 2009 and July 2010, the rail freight operator First GBRf hired several Class 57/3s from Virgin Trains to operate in top-and-tail formation with Mark 2 stock on a First Great Western Taunton - Cardiff diagram; primarily due to unreliability, the Class 57/3s were replaced by Class 67 locomotives.

=== Locomotive Services Limited ===
In December 2021, the train operating company Locomotive Services Limited purchased 57302 and 57311 from Direct Rail Services. Also acquired in 2022 was 57004; this was subsequently sold to Great Western Railway as a source of spares for their Class 57 fleet. 57004 was stripped of recoverable components by GWR engineers at LSL's Crewe depot in October 2022. Locomotive Services Limited also obtained 57003 directly from DRS, and 57007 from Harry Needle Railroad Company in 2022.

=== Romic Group ===
In July 2026, Romic Group purchased 57306 and 57308 from DRS, with the intention of making them for spot hire in the UK.

=== West Coast Railways ===
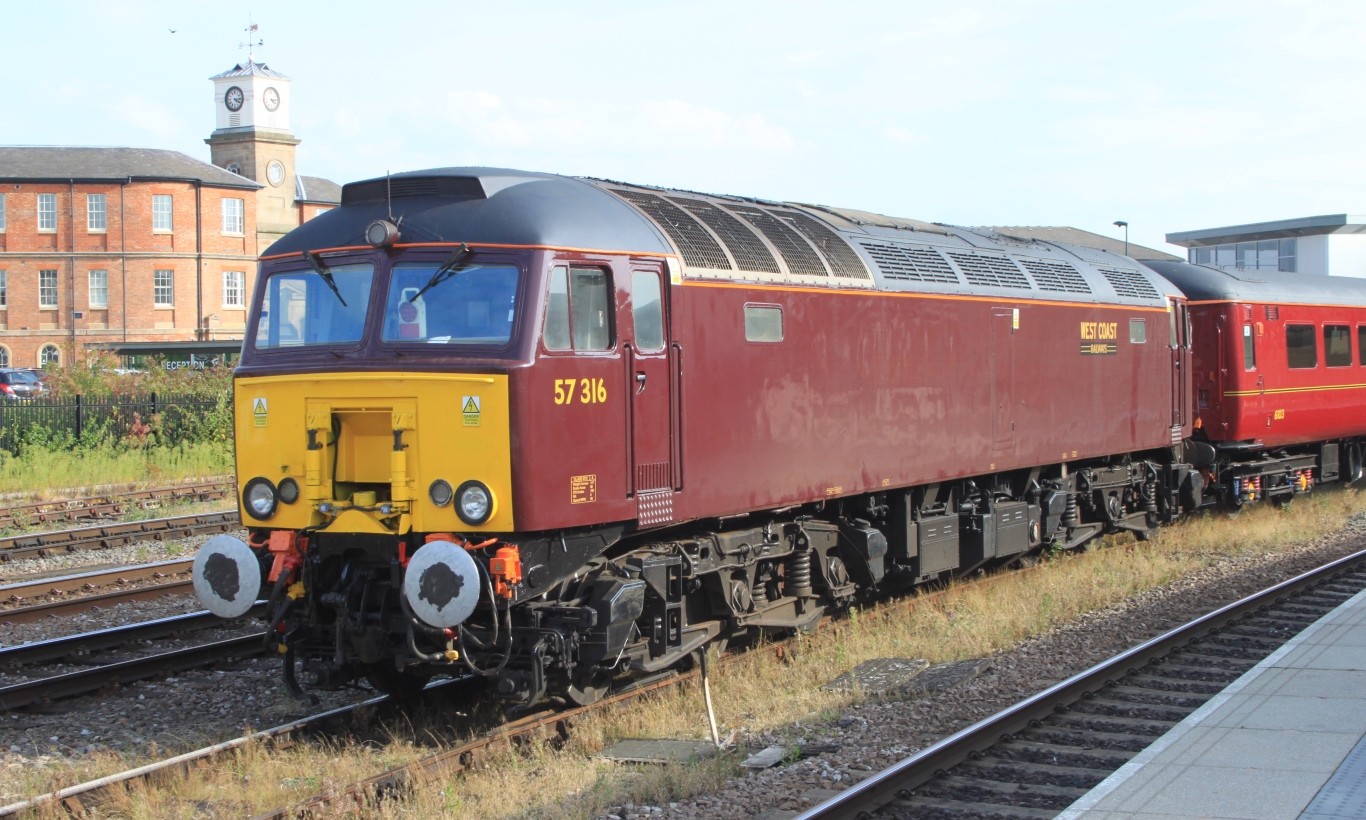
West Coast Railways 57316 at Derby

During April 2003, 57601 was sold to West Coast Railways (WCRC), but it remained in traffic with First Great Western for a few months. WCRC's managing director stated that the first action taken upon taking control of the locomotive was to pass it through his paint shop to apply the house colours in the original diesel style.

In January 2011, WCRC purchased 57001 from Porterbrook as well as 57005 from Advenza Freight, followed in April 2011 by 57006 from Advenza, with 57001 and 57006 returned to service and 57005 stored at Carnforth. During January 2013, 57313-316 were purchased from Porterbrook, a move which made WCRC the only company to operate all three of the Class 57 sub-classes. Following the sales of DRS's Heritage Fleet in 2022, West Coast Railway obtained ownership of 57009/010 directly from DRS; they also obtained 57008/011/012 from the original buyer, Ron Hull Limited. WCRC bought 57304 from DRS in July 2026.

== Former operators ==
=== Advenza Freight ===
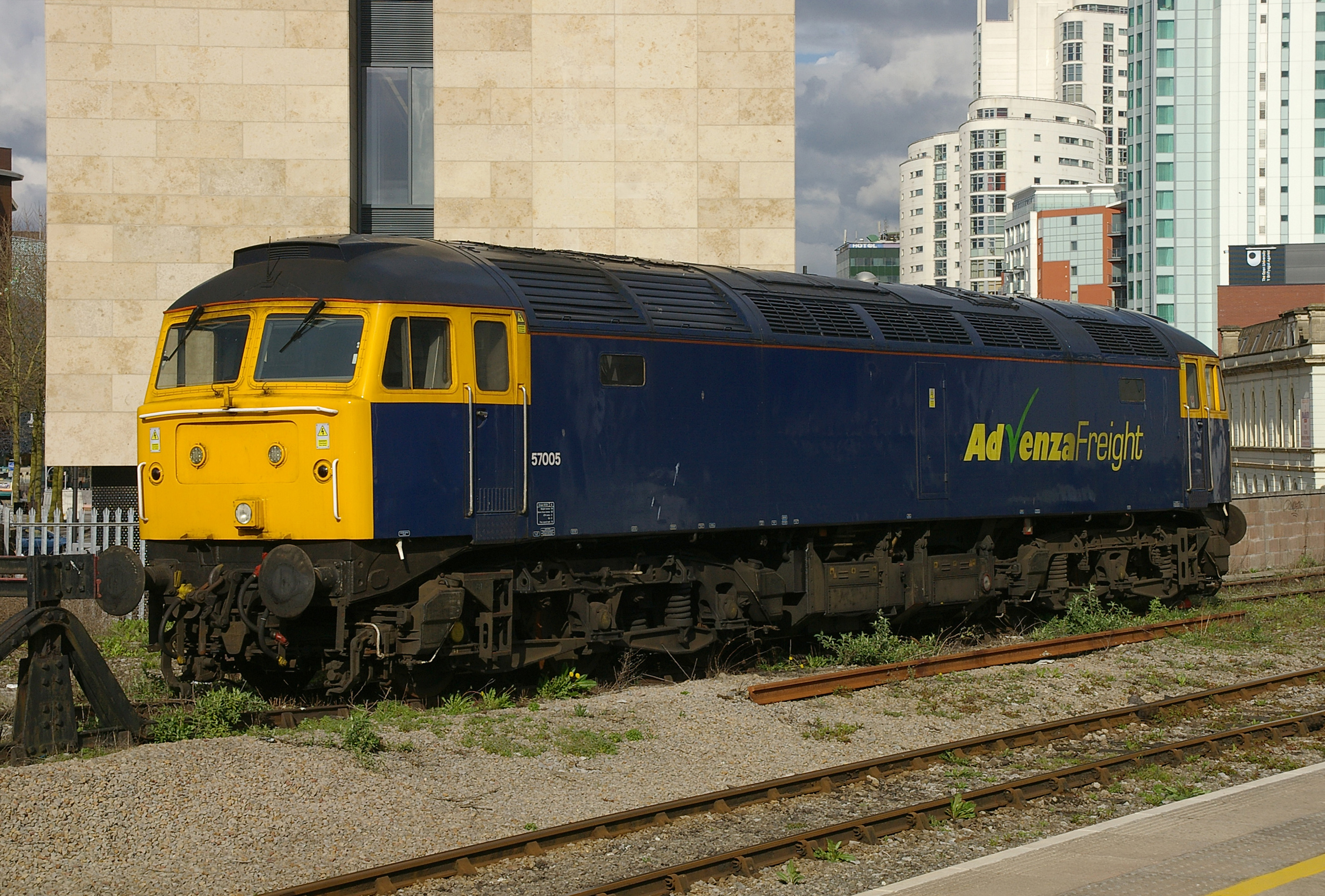
Advenza Freight liveried 57005 at Cardiff Central.

During January 2008, Advenza Freight purchased 57005 and 57006 from Porterbrook to use on a number of freight flows that had been recently won by the company. After Advenza ceased operations in 2009, 57005 was sold to West Coast Railways in January 2011, as was 57006 in April 2011.

=== Arriva Trains Wales ===
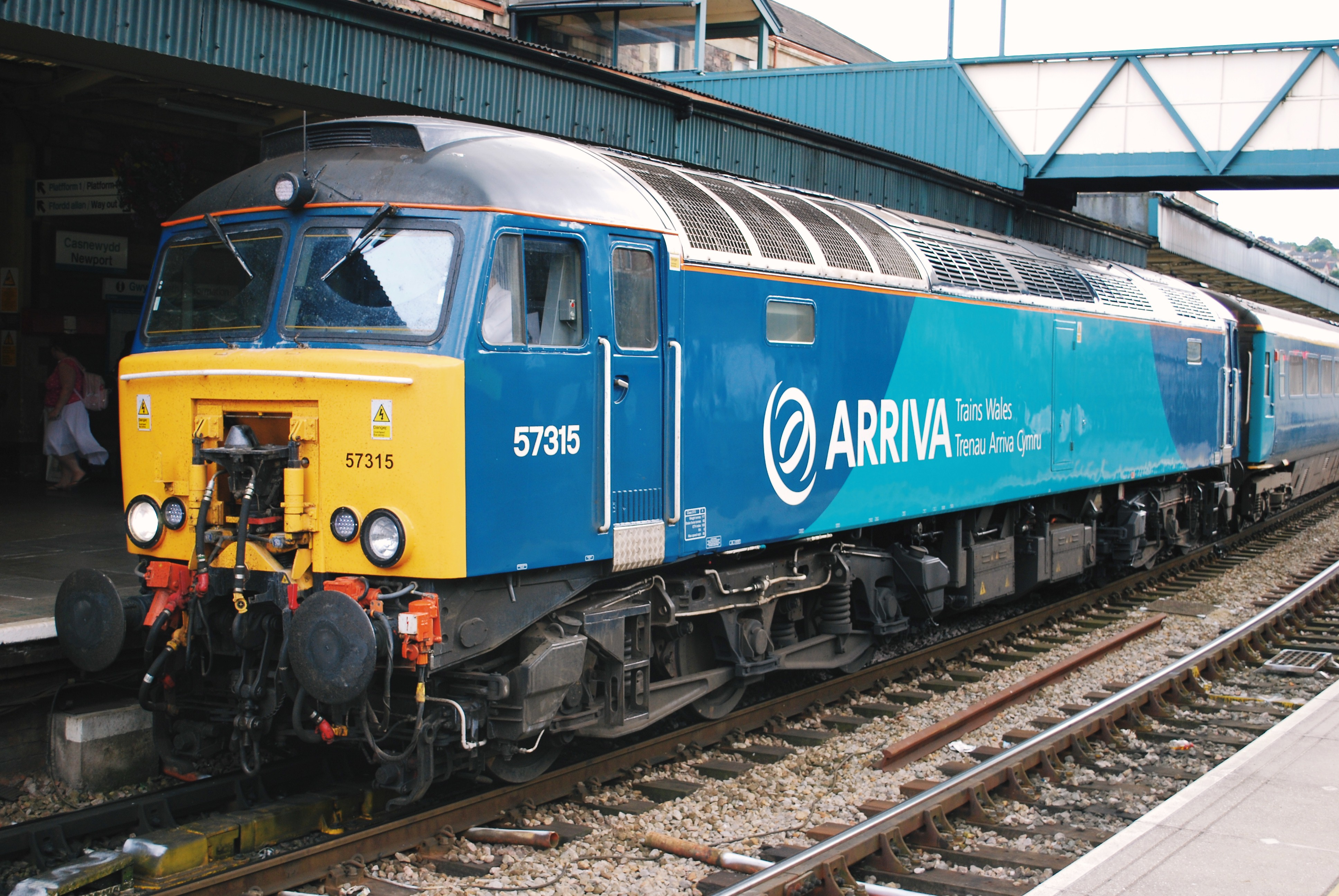
Arriva Trains Wales liveried 57315 hauling the Premier Service at Newport station in 2009

Between January and July 2006, passenger service operator Arriva Trains Wales hired Class 57/3s from Virgin Trains to operate a weekday Manchester Piccadilly to Holyhead diagram, hauling rakes of Mark 2 carriages.

During December 2008, Arriva Trains Wales commenced operation of the daily Premier Service between Holyhead and Cardiff with Mark 2 carriages. To provide the motive power for this train, ATW contracted Virgin Trains to provide Class 57/3 locomotives; these were initially operated in a top and tail formation, but later on their own. Four were repainted at Cardiff Canton, 57314 and 57315 receiving ATW livery, 57313 and 57316 plain blue with no signwriting. In March 2012, Class 67 locomotives took over the duties from the Class 57/3s.

=== Colas Rail ===
From the start of 2007 until 31 October 2009, the freight haulage company Colas Rail hired Class 57/3 locos from Virgin Trains to haul its timber trains. Starting in August 2009, a Class 57/0 was hired from Direct Rail Services on a trial basis for one or two days each week. Unlike the Virgin Trains Class 57/3s, all sixteen of which were variously used on the timber trains, Direct Rail Services specifically allocated 57002 to the Colas workings with 57008 as standby when 57002 was undergoing maintenance.

=== Direct Rail Services ===
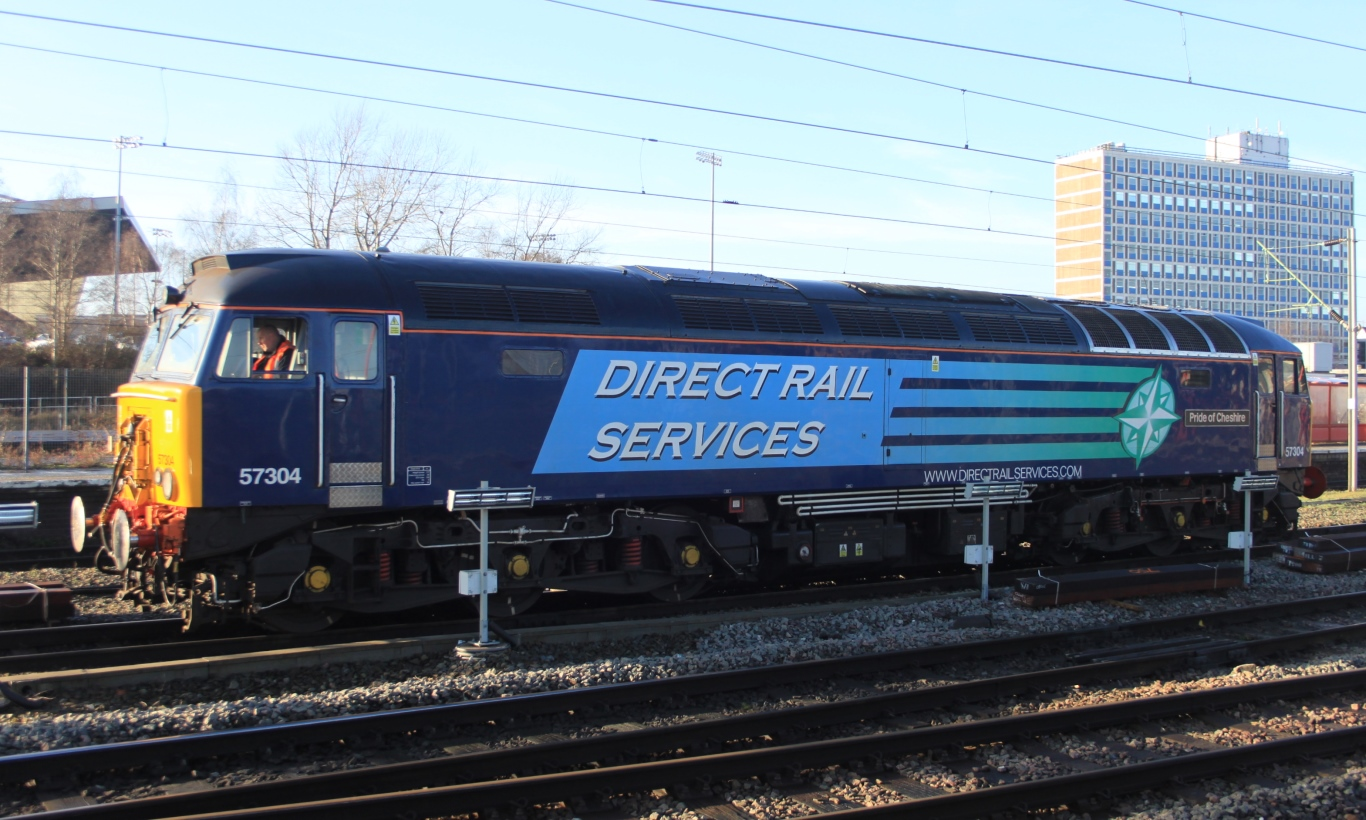
Direct Rail Services 57304 at Crewe

The mixed-traffic operator Direct Rail Services (DRS) previously operated nine class 57/0s—comprising 57002-57004 and 57007-57012. DRS sold most of their 57/0 fleet during 2022 and 2023, with the locomotives being dispersed between Locomotive Services Limited, West Coast Railway, Harry Needle Rail and Ron Hull Scrap Merchants. West Coast Railway subsequently bought 57008/11/12 from Ron Hull. The final DRS machine, 57002, was sold to Harry Needle Railroad Company. During April 2012, DRS agreed terms with Porterbrook to lease 57302, 57305, and 57309 via a three-year deal. In December 2012, DRS started provided locomotives to the passenger train operator Virgin Trains West Coast. Another three Class 57/3s were leased as part of the deal, however, two of these had entered warm storage within two years. During July 2014, DRS took over the leases of the remaining six Class 57/3s from the national railway infrastructure owner Network Rail. In June 2023, six were returned to Porterbrook with five moving to GB Railfreight and one to Great Western Railway, leaving DRS with 57304, 57307, 57308 and 57309. These were put up for sale in April 2026 with the sales completed in July 2026.

=== Freightliner ===
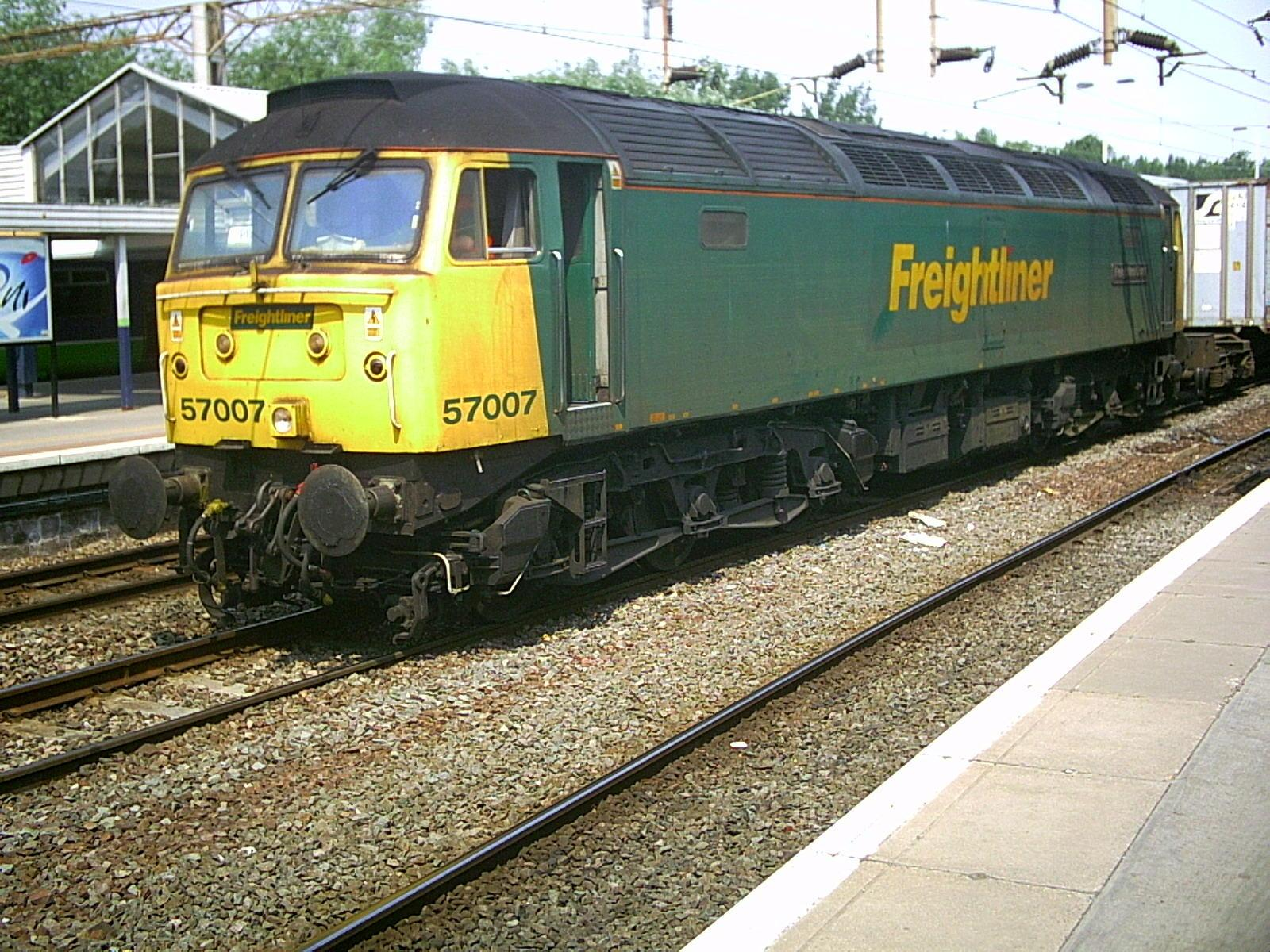
Freightliner 57007 at Northampton station in 2006

During 1997, the recently privatised freight operator Freightliner placed an order for an initial six Class 57/0 locomotives. The first of these was released in July 1998, and coincided with the unveiling of the new British Racing Green Freightliner livery. After an evaluation period, Freightliner was sufficiently impressed to order a further six during June 1999, and stated its long-term plans to eventually acquire a fleet of 25 Class 57s. However, this plan was abandoned and no further Class 57s would be ordered by the company, largely due to Freightliner switching preference towards new-built Class 66s and opting to transfer its remaining Class 47s to the metal recycler CF Booth.

During 2007, Freightliner started to replace its Class 57/0s with new Class 66 locomotives. Initially six Class 57/0s (the second batch) were returned to Porterbrook, and leased to Direct Rail Services in July 2007. Of the original six, three also went to Direct Rail Services and two to Advenza Freight in January 2008. The remaining Class 57/0 was sold to West Coast Railways in January 2011.

All were named:

- 57001 Freightliner Pioneer
- 57002 Freightliner Phoenix
- 57003 Freightliner Evolution
- 57004 Freightliner Quality
- 57005 Freightliner Excellence
- 57006 Freightliner Reliance
- 57007 Freightliner Bond
- 57008 Freightliner Explorer
- 57009 Freightliner Venturer
- 57010 Freightliner Crusader
- 57011 Freightliner Challenger
- 57012 Freightliner Envoy

=== Network Rail ===
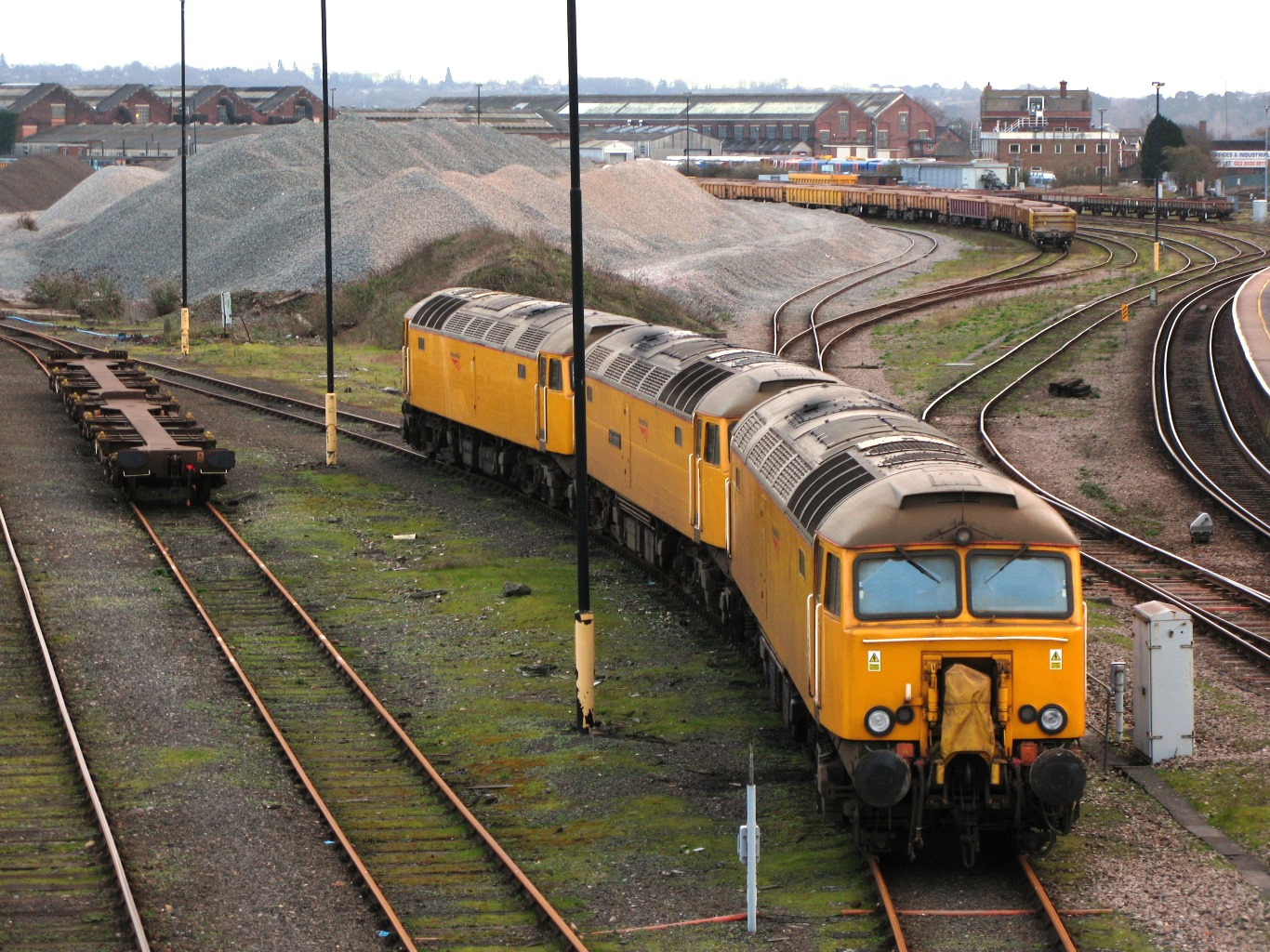
Network Rail 57305, 57312 & 57310 at Eastleigh station in 2014

During September 2011, Network Rail leased six Class 57/3s from Porterbrook, which were initially intended for use on test trains and the company's deicing trains.

Network Rail's Class 57 fleet was also expected to occasionally operate with 171, 350, 375, 376, 377, 444 and 450s in response to emergencies, their primary operational area was the Southern Region. During early 2013, the organisation openly stated its target for emergency rescue operations in the region was to keep five Class 57s continuously available to respond; of these, two were fitted with tightlock couplings while three featured Dellner couplings instead. Typically, rescued trains would be hauled onto the nearest convenient station, but the Class 57 had sufficient capabilities to haul most trains through their original schedule if desired. To achieve the necessary compatibilities to work with various EMUs, the locomotives were outfitted with multiple types of adapter cables, pressure switches, and pickups to convey electricity and other services, such as pressurised air, to the rescued train. In July 2014, the leases were transferred to Direct Rail Services.

=== Rail Operations Group ===
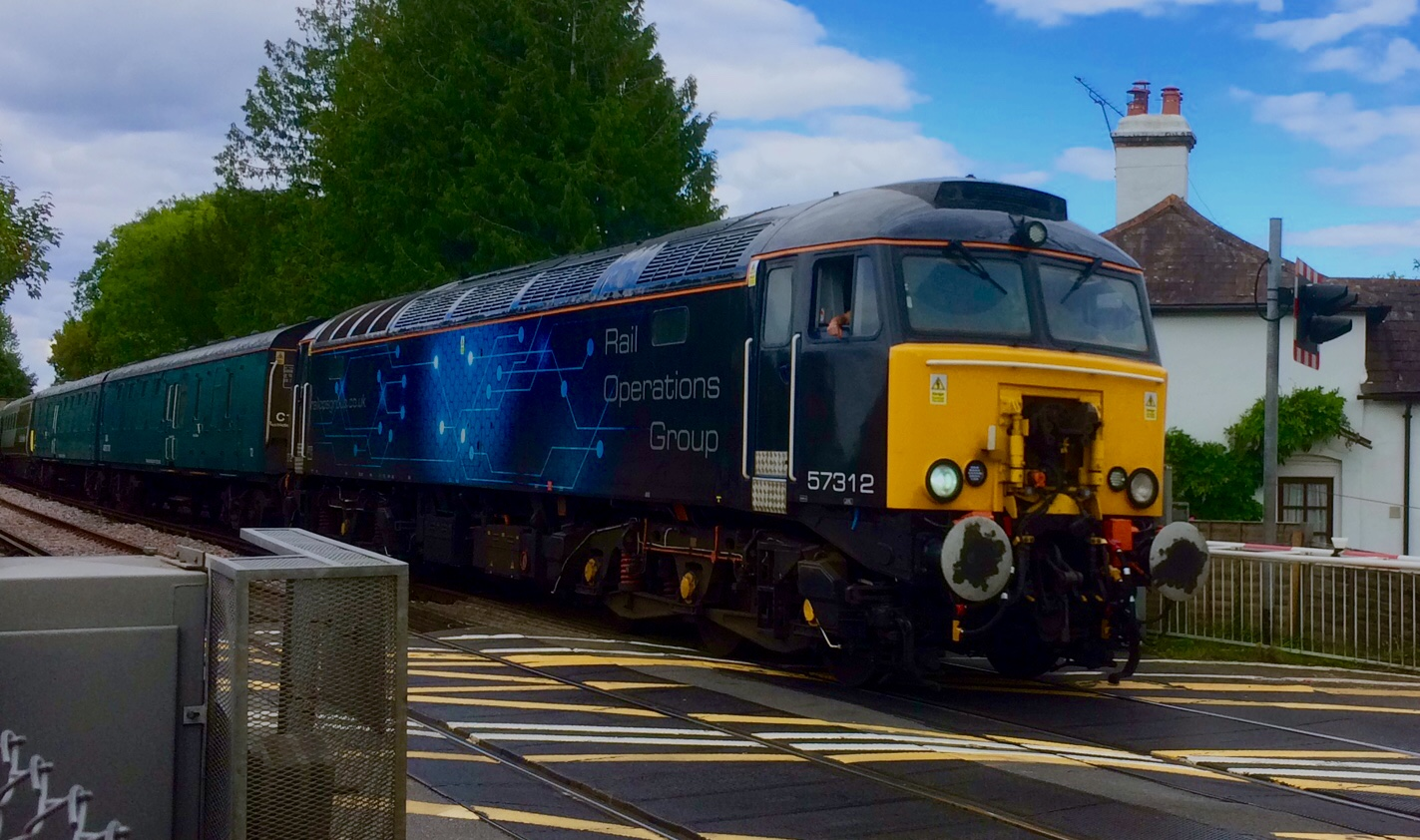
Rail Operations Group 57312 at Brockenhurst

During October 2018, the Rail Operations Group (ROG) confirmed a long-term lease for two Class 57 owned by Direct Rail Services. In October 2019, it was confirmed that ROG would lease a third Class 57/3 from Direct Rail Services. In March 2022, it was announced that the lease of the four Class 57s would be terminated and the locomotives returned to Direct Rail Services.

=== Virgin Trains West Coast ===
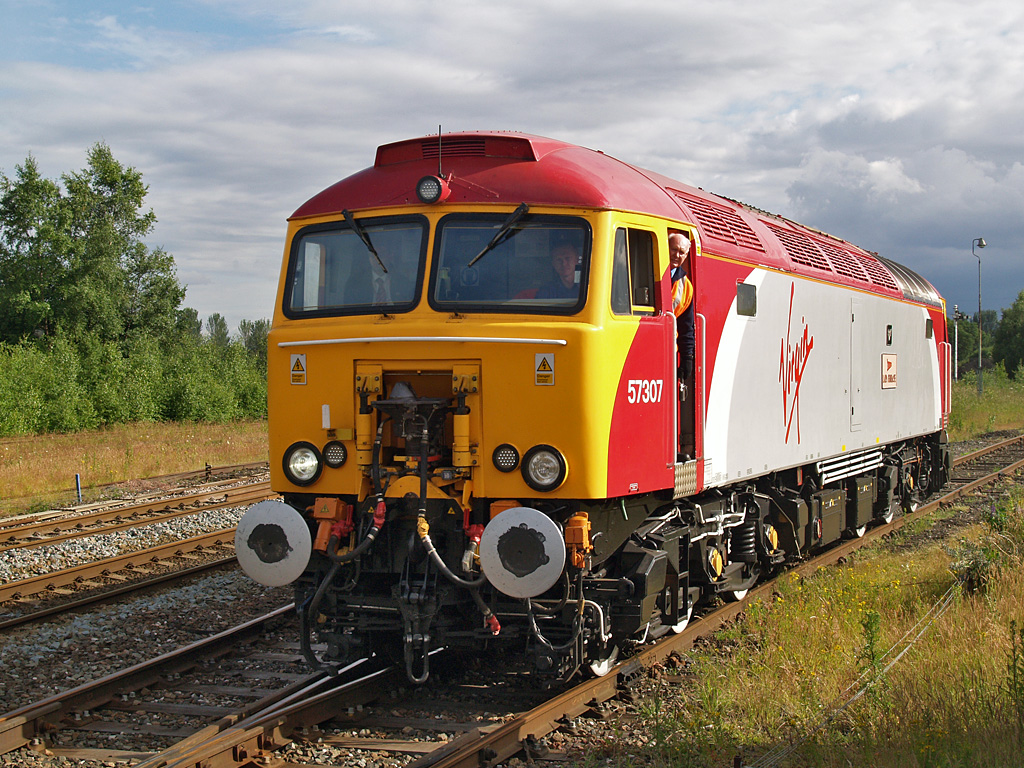
Virgin Trains 57307 Lady Penelope at Castleton East Junction, 2008

During April 2002, Virgin Trains West Coast signed a deal with Porterbrook for the rebuilding of 12 Class 47s into Class 57/3s, to create a fleet of locomotives for rescue duties, as well as haul electric trains along routes that lacked overhead wires to power them directly. The first of the locomotives was delivered in June 2002. After the discovery of structural defects, 47844 and 47849, which were to become 57307 and 57303, were replaced after they had been stripped down.

After it was announced by the Strategic Rail Authority during June 2003 that Class 390 Pendolinos would operate along the North Wales Coast Line to Holyhead hauled by Class 57/3s, a further four were ordered to expand Virgin's fleet. Furthermore, it was decided to fit the fleet with Dellner retractable couplings, and the original 12 Class 57/3s were retrofitted with the coupling from October 2003.

From spring 2005, Class 57/3s were used to haul two daily Virgin services from Crewe to Holyhead, complementing the Class 221 Super Voyagers that covered the other North Wales services. The downside of this arrangement was that whilst the Class 390 Pendolino sets are longer and have the added advantage of running off OHLE south of Crewe, coupling and uncoupling at Crewe added to the journey time. From December 2008, all North Wales Coast services were operated by Super Voyagers, except for one Saturday service, formed by a Class 57/3 and Class 390 Pendolino set. However, that was also converted to Voyager operation in November 2012.

As a nod to their purpose as rescue engines, Virgin named the engines after characters and vehicles from the TV series Thunderbirds. In keeping with that theme, the engines also bore special plates with the International Rescue logo above their regular nameplates including:

All were named:

- 57301 Scott Tracy
- 57302 Virgil Tracy
- 57303 Alan Tracy
- 57304 Gordon Tracy
- 57305 John Tracy
- 57306 Jeff Tracy
- 57307 Lady Penelope
- 57308 Tin Tin
- 57309 Brains
- 57310 Kyrano
- 57311 Parker
- 57312 The Hood
- 57313 Tracy Island
- 57314 Firefly
- 57315 The Mole
- 57316 FAB 1

After the completion of the West Coast Main Line upgrade in 2008, Virgin's need for Class 57/3s decreased. The sixteen-strong fleet found other work with both Arriva Trains Wales and Colas Rail. During September 2010, six were placed in warm storage at Eastleigh Works before being returned to Porterbrook and leased to Network Rail in September 2011.

In December 2012, the remaining seven Class 57/3s were returned, three of which were leased to Direct Rail Services, and the other four were sold to West Coast Railways.

== Fleet details ==
=== Fleet summary ===
Subclass	Qty.	Number range	Operators	Loco nos.	Total
57/0	11	57001–57003, 57005–57012	Locomotive Services Limited	57002,57003,57007	3
57/0	11	57001–57003, 57005–57012	West Coast Railways	57001, 57005–57006, 57008–57012	8
57/3	16	57301–57316	GB Railfreight	57303, 57305–306, 57310	4
57/3	16	57301–57316	Great Western Railway	57301, 57312	2
57/3	16	57301–57316	Locomotive Services Limited	57302, 57308, 57311	3
57/3	16	57301–57316	Romic Group	57307, 57309	2
57/3	16	57301–57316	West Coast Railways	57304, 57313–57316	5
57/6	5	57601–57605	Great Western Railway	57602–57605	4
57/6	5	57601–57605	West Coast Railways	57601	1

=== Fleet list ===
Key:	In service	Stored	Scrapped

Number	Rebuilt from	Operator	Livery	Status	Name Carried	Notes
57001	47356	West Coast Railways	West Coast Railways Maroon	In service	-	
57002	47322	Locomotive Services Limited	Lined Black	In service	Winston Churchill	
57003	47317	Locomotive Services Limited	Railfreight Distribution	In service	Inter City Rail Society - 50th Anniversary 1973-2023	
57004	47347		DRS Blue	Scrapped	-	Scrapped July 2023 at J Watson & Sons, Stafford
57005	47350	West Coast Railways	Advenza Freight Blue	Stored	-	Stored as a source of spare parts
57006	47187		West Coast Railways Maroon	In service	-	
57007	47332	Locomotive Services Limited	DRS Compass Blue	Stored	John Scott 12.5.45 - 22.5.12	Stored as a source of spare parts
57008	47060	West Coast Railways	West Coast Maroon	In Service	-	
57009	47079	West Coast Railways	BR Two Tone Green	In service	G. J. Churchwood	
57010	47231	West Coast Railways	West Coast Railways Maroon	In service	-	
57011	47329		DRS Compass Blue	Stored	-	Stored as a source of spare parts
57012	47388	West Coast Railways	West Coast Railways Maroon	In service	-	
57301	47845	Direct Rail Services	DRS Flash Blue/Green	Stored	Goliath	
57302	47827	Locomotive Services Limited	Lined Black	In service	Chad Varah (de-named)	
57303	47705	GB Railfreight	DRS Flash Blue/Green	In service	Pride of Carlisle	
57304	47807	West Coast Railways	DRS Flash Blue/Green	In service	Pride of Cheshire	Sold to West Coast Railways July 2026
57305	47822	GB Railfreight	Rail Operations Group blue	In service	Northern Princess	
57306	47814	GB Railfreight	DRS Flash Blue/Green	In service	Her Majesty's Railway Inspectorate 175	
57307	47225	Romic Group	DRS "20 Years of Direct Rail Services" Vinyl Blue	In service	Lady Penelope (de-named)	Sold to Romic in July 2026 for UK Spot Hire
57308	47846	Locomotive Services Limited	DRS Flash Blue/Green	In service	Jamie Ferguson	Sold to LSL July 2026.
57309	47806	Romic Group	DRS Flash Blue/Green	In service	Pride of Crewe	Sold to Romic in July 2026 for UK Spot Hire
57310	47831	GB Railfreight	GB Railfreight	In service		
57311	47817	Locomotive Services Limited	Lined Black	In service	The Institution of Mechanical Engineers	
57312	47330	Great Western Railway	DRS plain blue	In service	-	
57313	47371	West Coast Railways	West Coast Pullman livery	In service	Scarborough Castle	
57314	47372	West Coast Railways	West Coast Railways Maroon	In service	Conwy Castle	
57315	47234	West Coast Railways	Northern Belle livery	In service	-	
57316	47290	West Coast Railways	West Coast Railways Maroon	In service	Alnwick Castle	
57601	47825	West Coast Railways	West Coast Pullman livery	In service	Windsor Castle	
57602	47337	Great Western Railway	Great Western Railway Green	In service	Restormel Castle	
57603	47349	Great Western Railway	Great Western Railway Green	In service	Tintagel Castle	
57604	47209	Great Western Railway	GWR Brunswick Green	In service	Pendennis Castle	
57605	47206	Great Western Railway	Great Western Railway Green	In service	Totnes Castle	

== See also ==
• List of British Rail modern traction locomotive classes
