= Batsford =

Village in Gloucestershire, England

Coordinates: 52°0′10″N 1°43′45″W

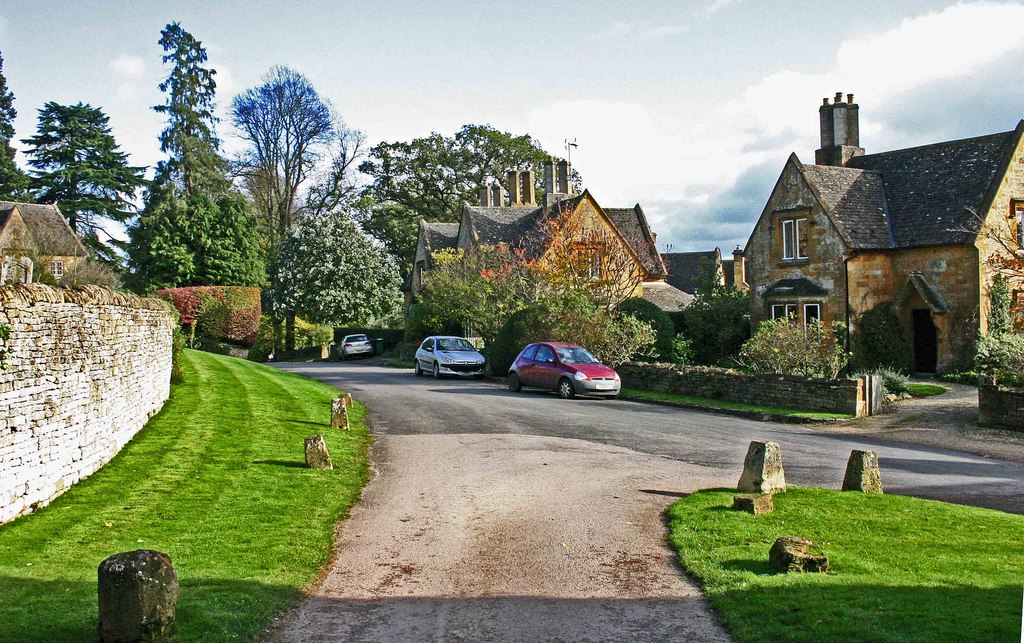

- Location within Gloucestershire
- OS grid reference: SP187339
- Civil parish: Batsford
- District: Cotswold
- Shire county: Gloucestershire
- Region: South West
- Country: England
- Sovereign state: United Kingdom
- Post town: Moreton-in-Marsh
- Postcode district: GL56
- Dialling code: 01386
- Police: Gloucestershire
- Fire: Gloucestershire
- Ambulance: South Western
- UK Parliament: North Cotswolds

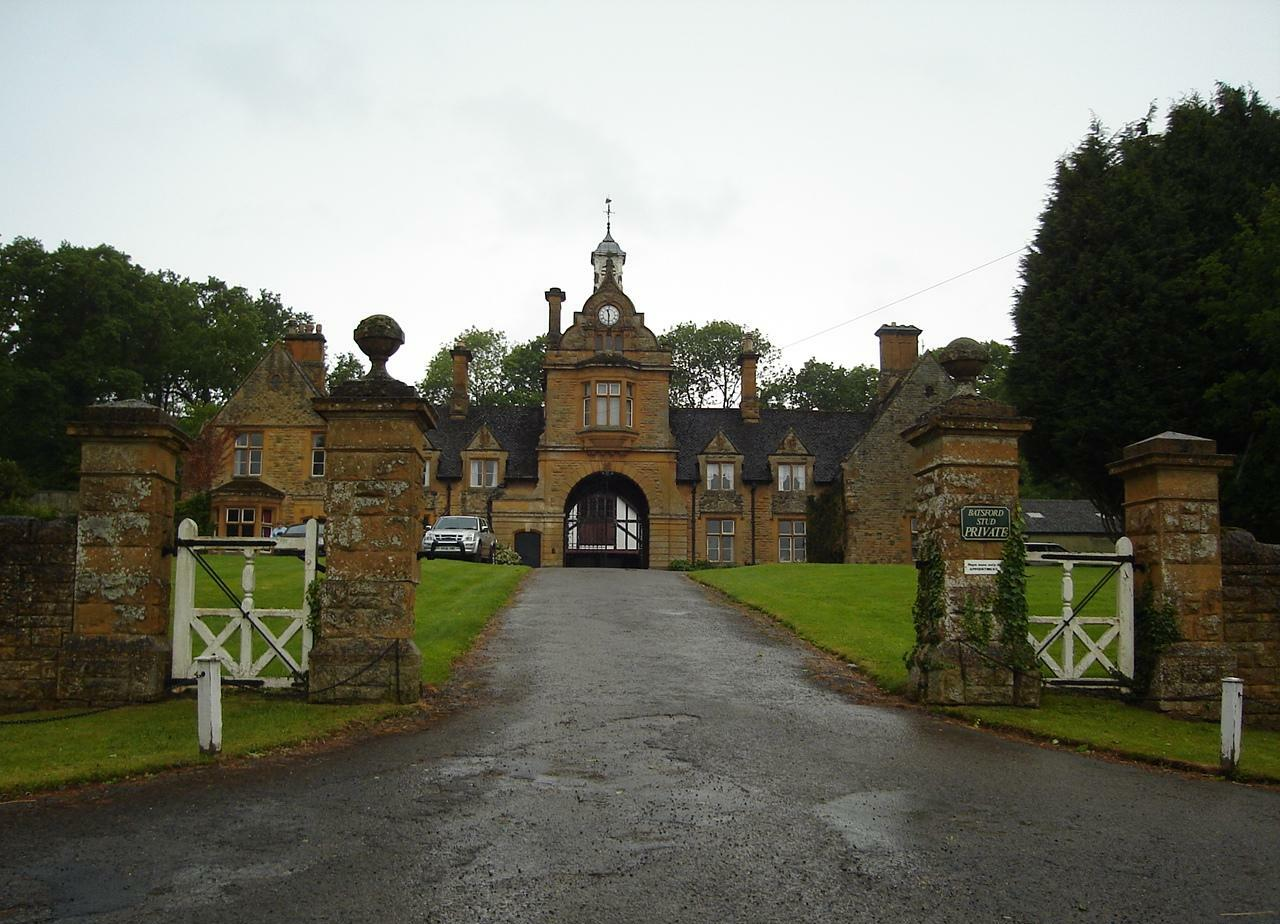
Batsford Stud Farm

Batsford is a village and civil parish in the Cotswold district of Gloucestershire, England. The village is about 1.5 miles (2 km) north-west of Moreton-in-Marsh. There is a falconry centre close to the village and Batsford Arboretum is nearby, situated on the Cotswold escarpment.

Moreton-in-Marsh and Batsford War Memorial, on the High Street in Moreton-in-Marsh, commemorates the village's dead of two World Wars.

== Civil parish ==
The civil parish of Batsford extends 2 miles (3 km) east from the village, and includes the hamlets of Dorn and Lower Lemington. According to the 2001 census the parish had a population of 99. Batsford was an ancient parish, which became a civil parish in 1866. In 1935 the civil parish more than doubled in size, when Dorn was transferred from the parish of Blockley and the civil parish of Lower Lemington was abolished and merged into Batsford.

=== Religious sites ===
The Church of St Leonard at Lower Lemington was built in the 12th century. It is a grade I listed building.

== Notable residents ==
- Richard Freeman, Lord Chancellor of Ireland
- The 1st Baron Dulverton
