= Cotswold Rail =

English locomotive spot-hire company

- Founded: 2000
- Defunct: 2010
- Fate: Dissolved
- Headquarters: Gloucester
- Services: Locomotive spot-hire
- Parent: Adrian Parcell
- Subsidiaries: Advenza Freight
- Website: www.costwoldrail.com

Cotswold Rail was an English company, based in Gloucester, which arranged the spot-hire of shunting and mainline locomotives.

== History ==
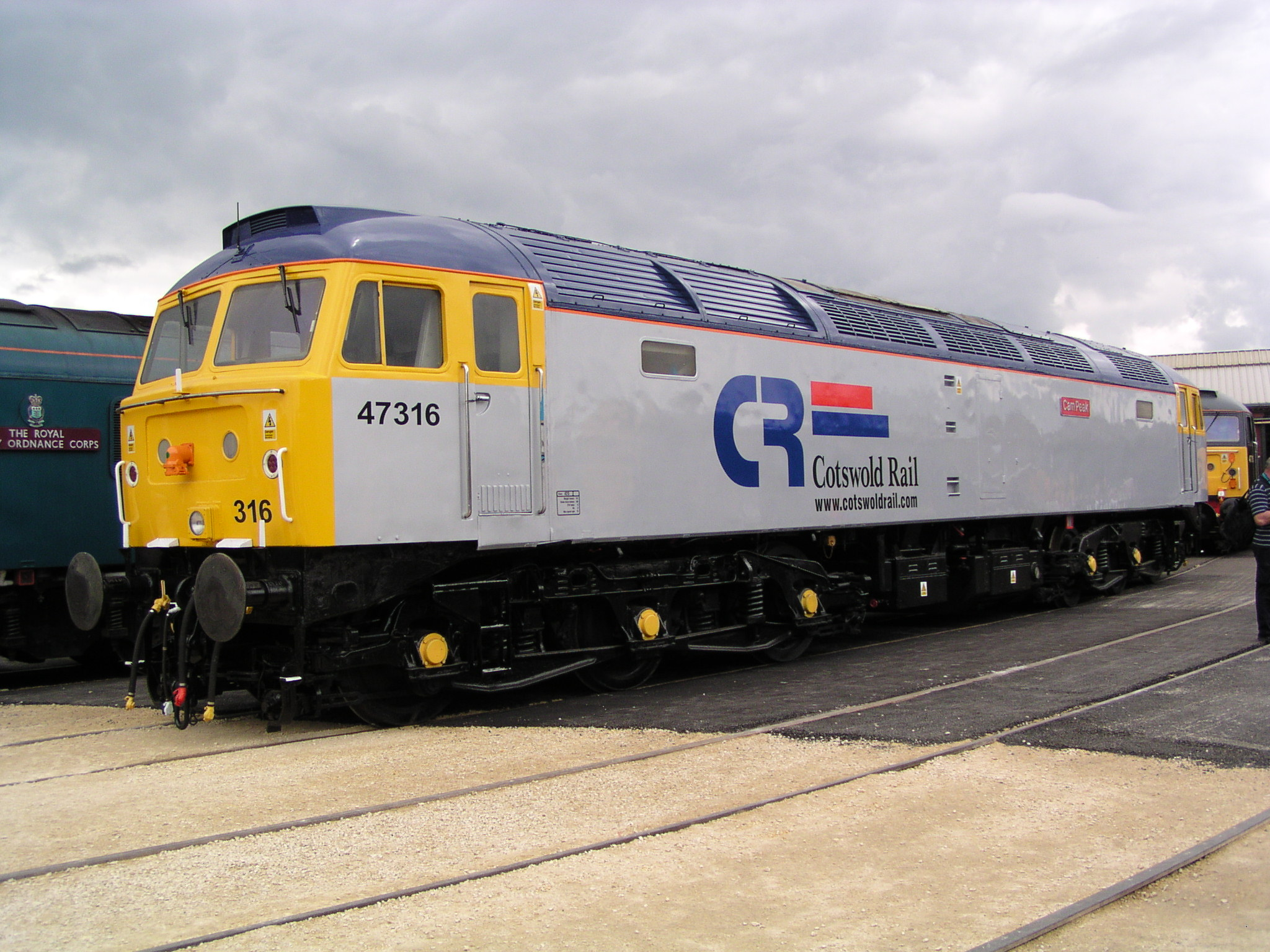
47316 Cam Peak at Doncaster Works in July 2003

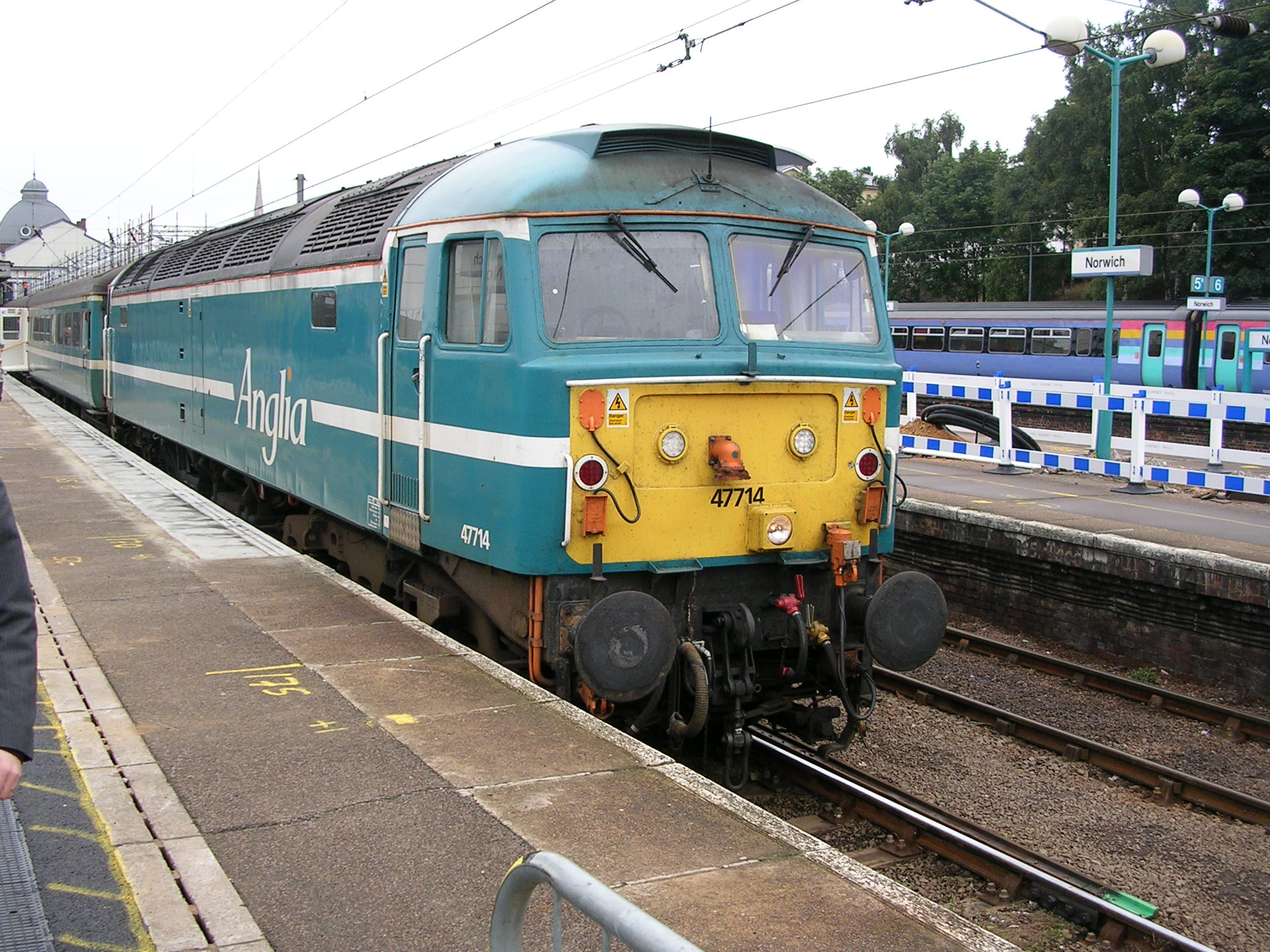
Anglia Railways liveried 47714 at Norwich station in 2005

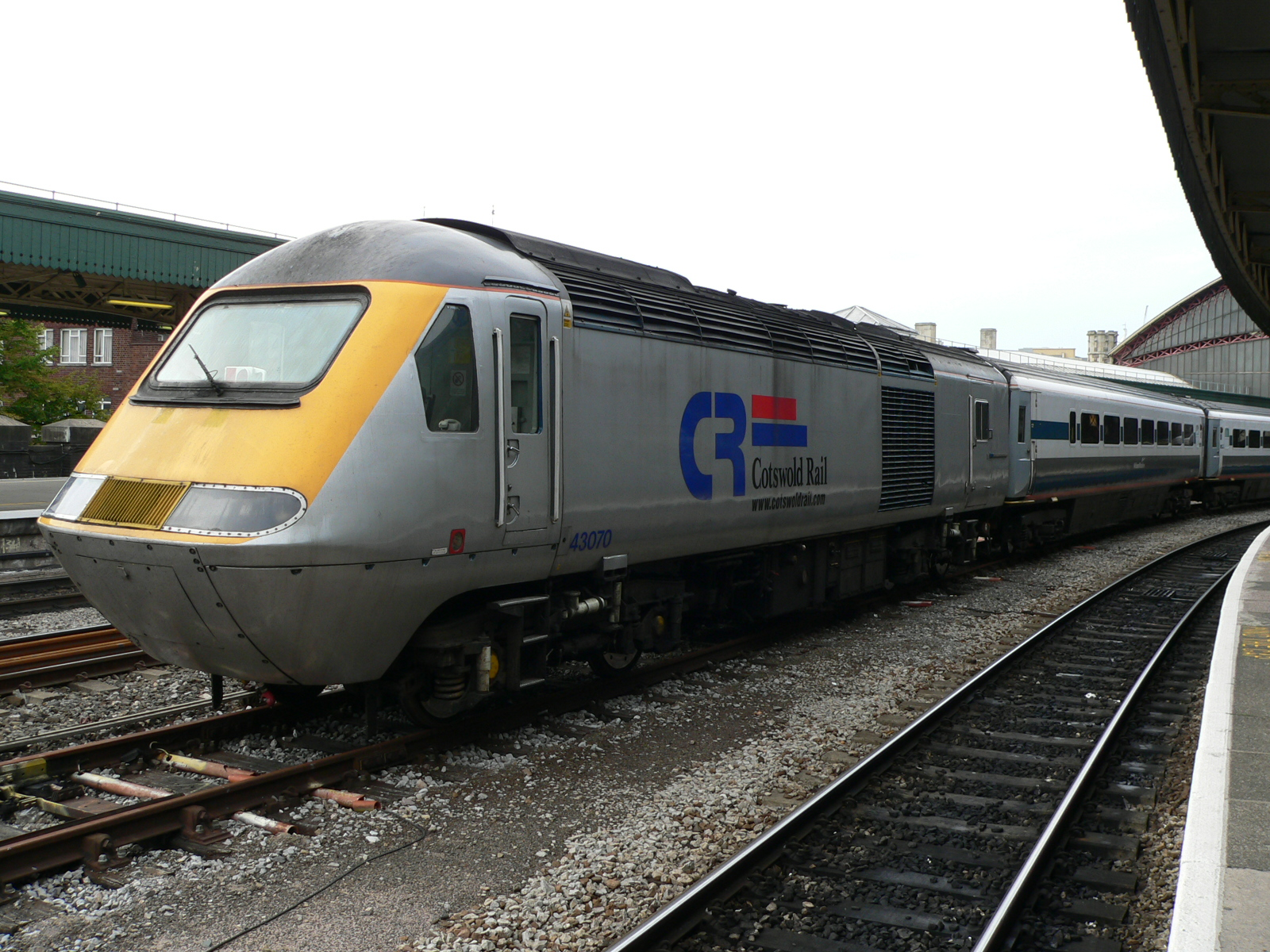
43070 at Bristol Temple Meads station in August 2006

Cotswold Rail was founded in 2000, initially as a broker for rolling stock. In June 2000, it offered 13 Class 141 Pacers for sale.

In 2001, some Class 08 shunting locomotives were purchased, which were hired to both industry and main-line railway companies.

Cotswold Rail also purchased a fleet of Class 47 locomotives. From June 2002 until June 2009, it provided Class 47s for Anglia Railways (and its successor National Express East Anglia), as rescue locomotives, and to haul Mark 2 sets on summer Saturday services from Norwich to Great Yarmouth.

In 2004, Cotswold Rail leased 12 former Virgin Trains Mark 3 carriages from Rolling stock company Porterbrook.

In April 2005, the company acquired leased some Class 87 electric locomotives. A fleet of ten locomotives was planned, for spot-hire work, charter operations, and a new intermodal freight flow. However, all locomotives were returned to the leasing company (Porterbrook) in 2006.

In September 2005, two former Virgin CrossCountry High Speed Train sets were leased. These were returned in August 2006.

In 2005, Cotswold Rail purchased Advenza Freight, primarily for its safety case, which allowed it to operate freight services. In 2007, the railtour promoter, Steamy Affairs, was purchased.

As a result of HM Revenue & Customs successfully applying in October 2009 to have Advenza Freight wound up over unpaid taxes, Cotswold Rail entered voluntary administration in January 2010.

== Fleet ==
Cotswold Rail's livery adopted a silver livery, with red and blue bands. It named its locomotives after geographical features, such as Cam Peak and the Fosse Way, or after music industry personalities, namely John Peel, Joe Strummer and Captain Sensible.

== Depot ==
In 2006, Cotswold Rail leased the closed Gloucester Horton Road depot. The facility, which had last been used in 1992, was next to Gloucester station. It was also the location of the company offices, and usually played host to stabled company-owned locomotives.

== Blue Pullman ==
In 2007, Cotswold Rail acquired rights to the Blue Pullman service, setting up The Blue Pullman Train Co, using Blue Pullman-liveried coaches purchased following the receivership of the previous operator, FM Rail. Cotswold re-launched the Blue Pullman service in February 2007, using its silver Class 47s.
