= Moreton-in-Marsh =

Town in Gloucestershire, England

Coordinates: 51.988°N 1.701°W

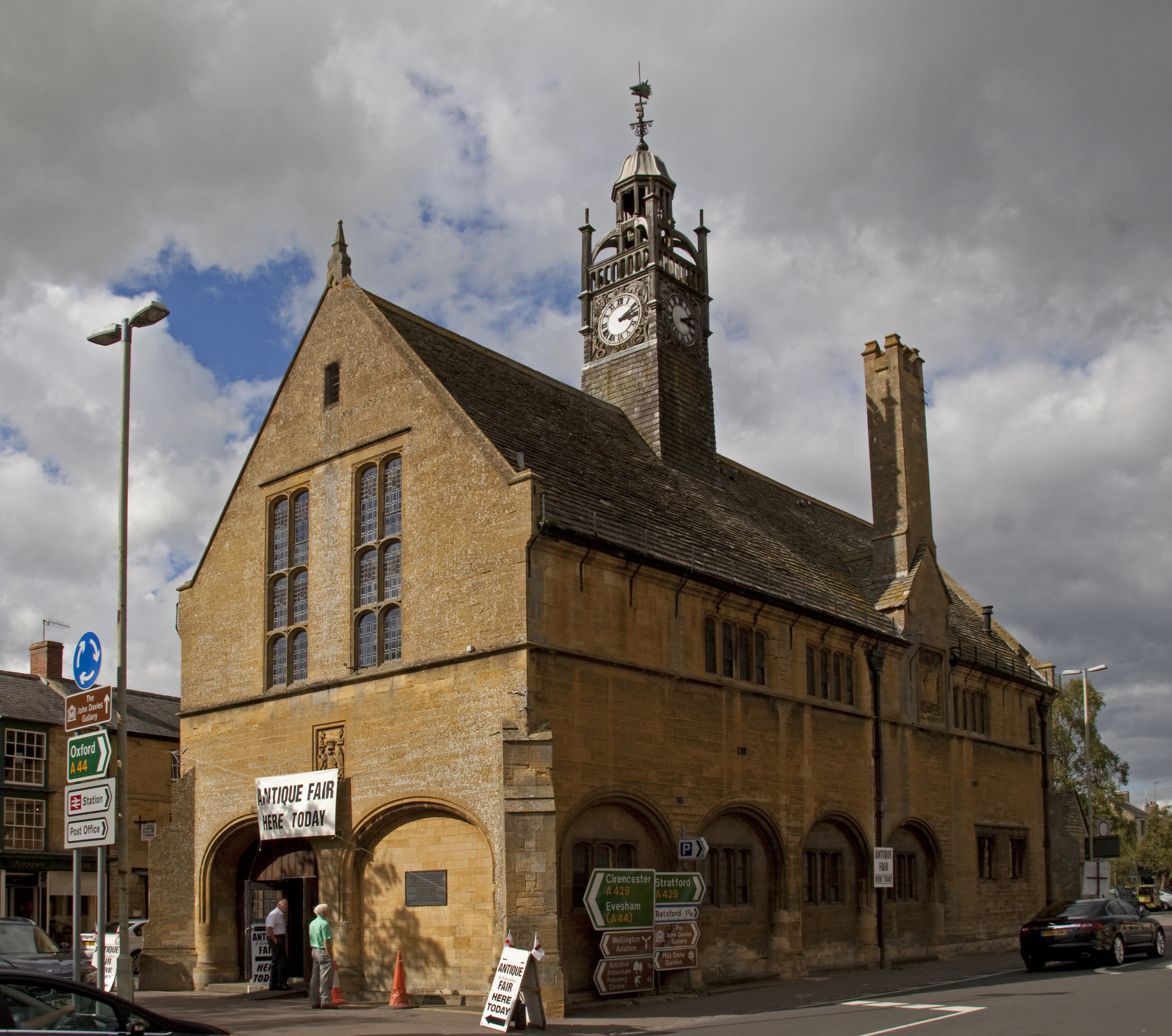
- Redesdale Hall, Moreton-in-Marsh

- Location within Gloucestershire
- Population: 5,015 (2021 Census)
- OS grid reference: SP2032
- District: Cotswold
- Shire county: Gloucestershire
- Region: South West
- Country: England
- Sovereign state: United Kingdom
- Post town: MORETON-IN-MARSH
- Postcode district: GL56
- Dialling code: 01608
- Police: Gloucestershire
- Fire: Gloucestershire
- Ambulance: South Western
- UK Parliament: North Cotswolds

Moreton-in-Marsh (/ˈmɔːrtən ɪn mɑːrʃ/) is a market town in the Evenlode Valley, within the Cotswolds district and Area of Outstanding Natural Beauty in Gloucestershire, England.

Its flat and low-lying site is surrounded by the Cotswold Hills. The River Evenlode rises near Batsford, runs around the edge of Moreton and meanders towards Oxford, where it flows into the river Thames just east of Eynsham.

Just over 2 miles (3.2 km) east of Moreton, the Four shire stone marked the boundary of the historic counties of Gloucestershire, Warwickshire, Worcestershire and Oxfordshire, until the re-organisation of the county boundaries in 1931. Since then it marks the meeting place of Gloucestershire, Warwickshire and Oxfordshire.

Moreton-in-Marsh is widely regarded as the inspiration for the fictional town of Bree, which features in J. R. R. Tolkien’s The Lord of the Rings and in the backstory to The Hobbit. This association is reinforced by The Bell Inn, Moreton-in-Marsh, which is often cited as the inspiration for the Prancing Pony, the inn at Bree where Gandalf meets Thorin Oakenshield, and where Frodo Baggins meets Strider and first puts on the One Ring.

== Toponymy (Place Name) ==
Moreton is derived from Old English which means "Farmstead on the Moor" and "in Marsh" is from henne and mersh meaning a marsh used by birds such as moorhens. An alternative suggestion is that 'Marsh' is a corruption of 'March', early English for boundary.

== History ==
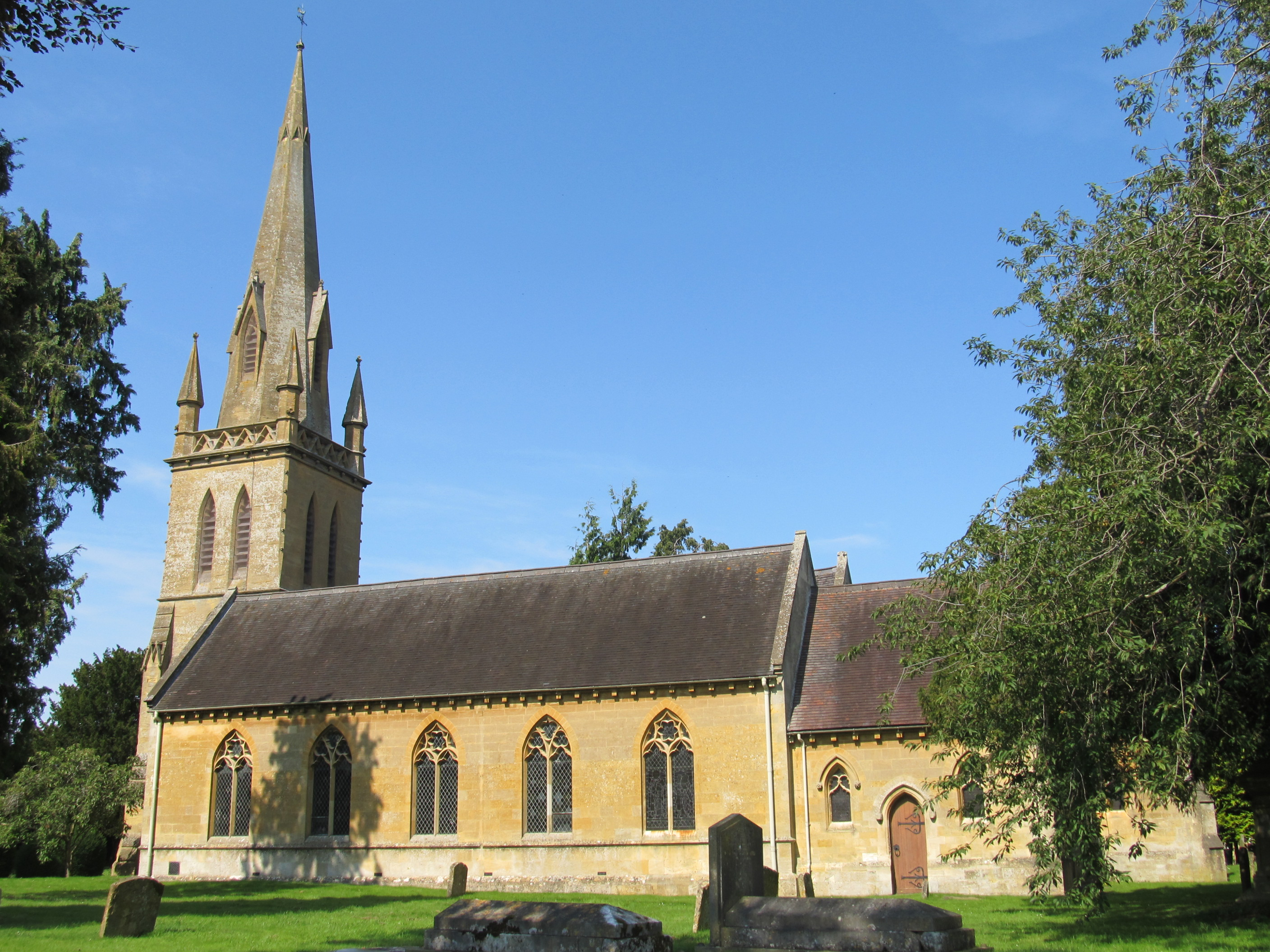
St David’s Church, the parish church of Moreton-in-Marsh

A settlement was built during the British Iron Age, just north-west of the town centre near the cricket ground. Archaeological research has found Roman pottery and coins at the site, showing that it remained occupied after the Roman invasion of Britain. During this period, the Fosse Way, one of the best preserved Roman routes in Britain, was constructed. It was initially constructed by the Roman army but was subsequently maintained by the local Civitas. The course can be traced through the county by the modern roads that tend to follow its course, although there are deviations such as south of the town where it crosses the hill into Stow-on-the-Wold.

Moreton is first mentioned as a Saxon settlement around 577 AD. Following the Norman Conquest of Britain, the township was part of the monastic property held by Westminster Abbey in London. Abbott Richard of Barking began developing Moreton as a medieval market town between 1222 and 1246. The new town was built on common land bordering the Fosse Way to the north-west of the original Saxon settlement. St David's Church is in the centre of the original settlement, which is still called Old Town. To accommodate medieval markets, the new town was developed with a long and wide High Street.

The town's economy thrived, thanks to wool and cloth-making in the medieval era. "It's why the high street has so many elegant 18th century inns and houses."

The Curfew Tower, on the corner of Oxford Street, probably dates from the 16th century. Its bell was cast in 1633 and its clock was built in 1648. The Royalist cavalry was based in the town during the Civil War; in 1644, King Charles I of England stopped at the White Hart Royal in 1637 and granted a charter for the market.

The Church of England parish church of Saint David began as a chapel of ease for Blockley, to which the residents of Moreton had to transport their dead for burial. The early history of the church in Moreton is not clear, but there is evidence that a primitive Celtic place of worship preceded the church on the present site, which had seven springs. The church at Moreton came under the jurisdiction of the Batsford Estate, when that estate was given to the Bishops of Worcester in the 12th century. Latterly, the church in Moreton was a chapel-at-ease for Batsford, which was technically the parish church. The appointment of the vicar for Batsford with Moreton alternates between the Bishop of Gloucester and the Lord of the Manor at Batsford, currently Lord Dulverton, who, until the Second World War, exercised his right to collect a shilling (5 pence) a year for every shop window facing Moreton High Street. There is a tradition that the church was rebuilt and reconsecrated in the middle of the 16th century. The nave was enlarged in 1790, with a £1,000 gift from Samuel Wilson Warneford, most of the church was rebuilt in 1858 and the tower was replaced in 1860. The chancel and south aisle were enlarged in 1892 and the east end of the south aisle has been used as a chapel since 1927.

A nonconformist congregation started meeting in Moreton in 1796 and was constituted as a Congregational church in 1801; it had a chapel built in 1817. In 1860–61, the Congregationalists replaced the chapel with a new one on the same site in a mixed neo-Grecian and Romanesque style. The congregation voted against the merger with the Presbyterians and remains a Congregational Chapel. The Roman Catholics, without their own church in Moreton, held a mass there on Sunday mornings for several years.

According to one report, the town was in a suitable location for the "old coaching route from London to Worcester [and] thrived as a stopping place for stagecoaches, in particular The Redesdale Arms and The White Hart Royal."

The Stratford and Moreton Tramway was built between 1821 and 1826, linking Moreton with the Stratford-on-Avon Canal at Stratford. It was horse-drawn until 1859, when the section between Moreton and Shipston-on-Stour was converted to a branch line railway operated with steam locomotives. The Oxford, Worcester and Wolverhampton Railway, built between 1845 and 1851, passes through Moreton. The railway station was opened in 1853. The Great Western Railway (GWR) took over the OW&W Railway in 1862 and the Shipston-on-Stour branch in 1868. The GWR withdrew passenger trains from the branch in 1929 and British Railways withdrew freight traffic and the last train, Driver Ted Hardiman, Fireman Ken Hughes and Guard Perry, and one paying passenger, Christopher Horne, ran on 2 May 1960.

The OW&W Railway is now part of the Cotswold line. The line between Oxford (Wolverton Junction) and Worcester (Norton Junction) was singled in the 1970s, except for the distance between Shipton-under-Wychwood to Moreton-in-Marsh, but subsequently the double track has been replaced, except between Evesham and Worcester (Norton Junction) in 2011. Traffic to and from Long Marston uses the west end of the line and freight services are planned to re-use this route. In 2019, the platforms were lengthened after the removal of all sidings from the station area.

Redesdale Hall, which was designed by the architects Sir Ernest George and Harold Peto, became the market hall and town hall for the town and was completed in 1887. The town was often misdescribed as Moreton-in-the-Marsh into the early 20th century. The name was confirmed as Moreton-in-Marsh before 1930.

In 1940, a large area of level land east of the town was developed as RAF Moreton-in-Marsh and used as a training airfield, largely by Wellington bombers. 38 men flying to or from RAF Moreton-in-Marsh died during the Second World War. The former airfield is now the Fire Service College, where senior fire officers from brigades all over the UK undergo operational, management and leadership training. The same complex is also now the headquarters of the Institution of Fire Engineers, the professional body for fire fighters, officers and civilians with an interest in fire engineering.

Moreton-in-Marsh and Batsford War Memorial is in the High Street and commemorates the dead of the First and Second World Wars, together with one serviceman killed subsequently. One woman is featured: Diana Hope Rowden, an agent of the Special Operations Executive who was killed in a concentration camp in 1944, had served previously at RAF Moreton-in-Marsh. Despite the number of serving men in the Glorious Glosters, all these men of the town returned safely from the Korean War.

Floods, which blocked the High Street, were fairly regular from the 1940s to the 1960s, until works were carried out on the ditches around the town and the camber on the A44 descending to Moreton from Bourton on the Hill; these works appear to have resolved most of the problems. The last time Moreton was badly flooded was in 2007.

There was a Roman fort near Dorn (one mile north-west of Moreton). The annual Moreton and District Agricultural Show, held on the first Saturday in September, is held on part of the site of the fort on the Batsford Estate; the show has been running since 1949.

The railway line to Worcester runs alongside the showground and, at Dorn, reaches the highest point between Oxford and Worcester; this is also the river Thames/river Severn watershed.

Moreton was once the headquarters of the railway spot-hire company Cotswold Rail.

== Governance ==
The town is represented on Cotswold District Council by councillors from two wards. Since May 2023, Angus Jenkinson of the Liberal Democrats represents Moreton East and Daryl Corps of the Conservatives represents Moreton West.

== Transport ==
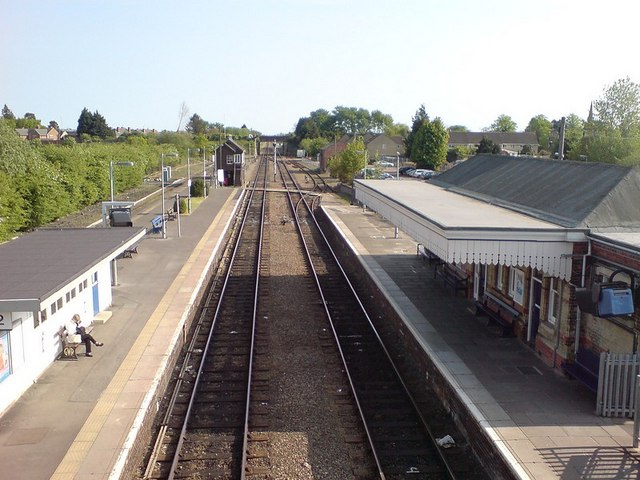
Moreton-in-Marsh station

The town is served by Moreton-in-Marsh railway station, a stop on the Cotswold Line. Great Western Railway operates regular train services to London Paddington, Hereford, Worcester Foregate Street and Great Malvern.

Local bus services are operated predominantly by Stagecoach Midlands and Pulhams Coaches; key routes that serve the town lead to Stratford-upon-Avon, Bourton-on-the-Water and Cheltenham.

The town stands at the crossroads of the Fosse Way Roman road (now the A429) and the A44.

== Amenities ==
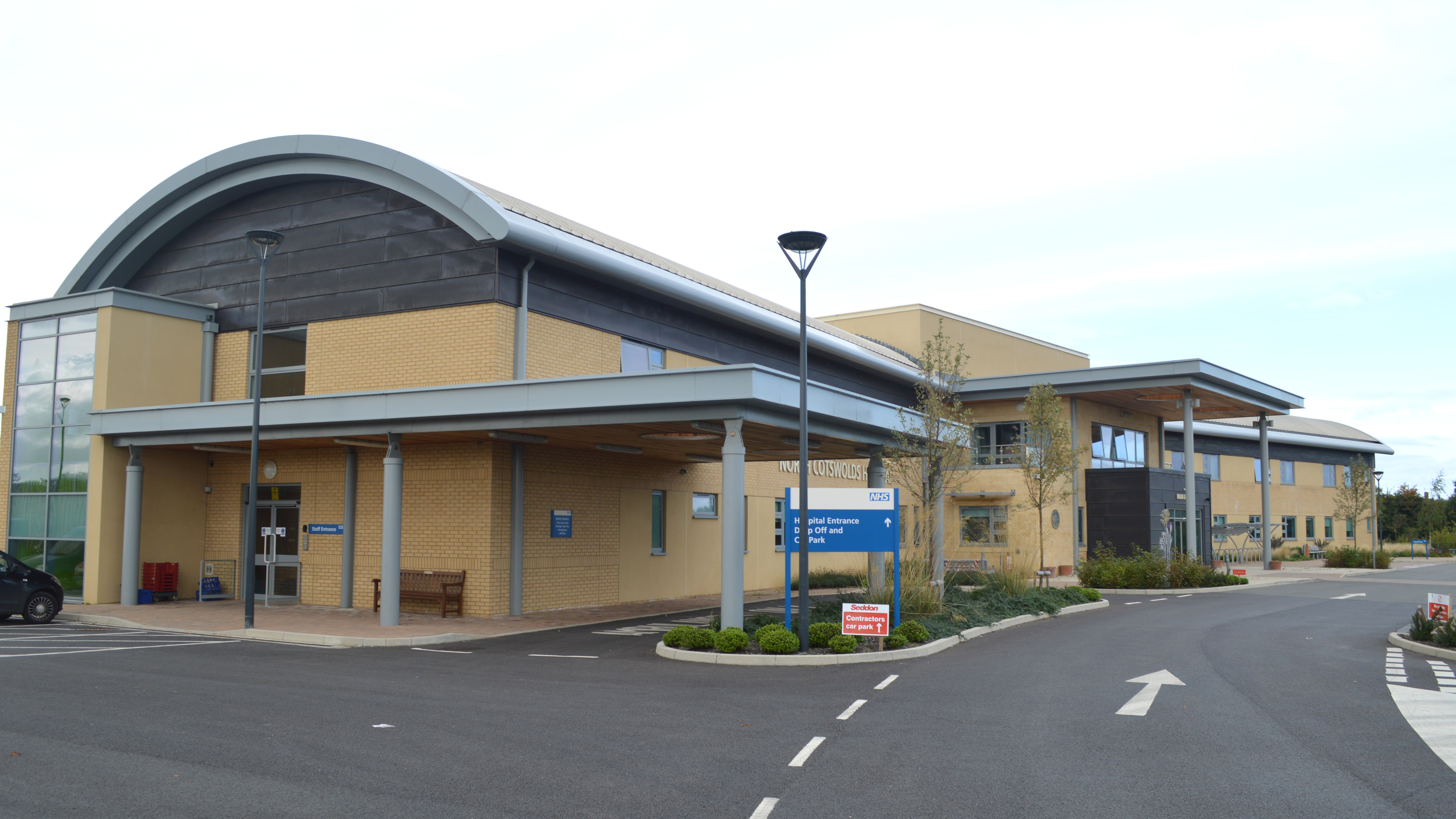
North Cotswolds Hospital, on the southern outskirts of Moreton-in-Marsh, built in 2012 replacing a town centre cottage hospital.

Moreton has many buildings in characteristic Cotswold stone. There are two supermarkets (Aldi and the Co-Operative), two general stores (Spar and Tesco Express), and a number of antique shops, bars, cafes, hotels, inns and restaurants located down the High Street and Stow Road. A Caravan Club site is a short walk east on the Broadway Road (A44), past the Wellington Aviation Museum, a museum of the history of the Vickers Wellington bomber. Other local attractions include Batsford Arboretum near Batsford village and the onion-domed Sezincote house and gardens.

The White Hart Royal, originally a seventeenth-century coaching inn, was occupied by King Charles I when he took shelter in the building following the Battle of Marston Moor (during the First English Civil War of 1644–1646) and supposedly left without paying his bill.

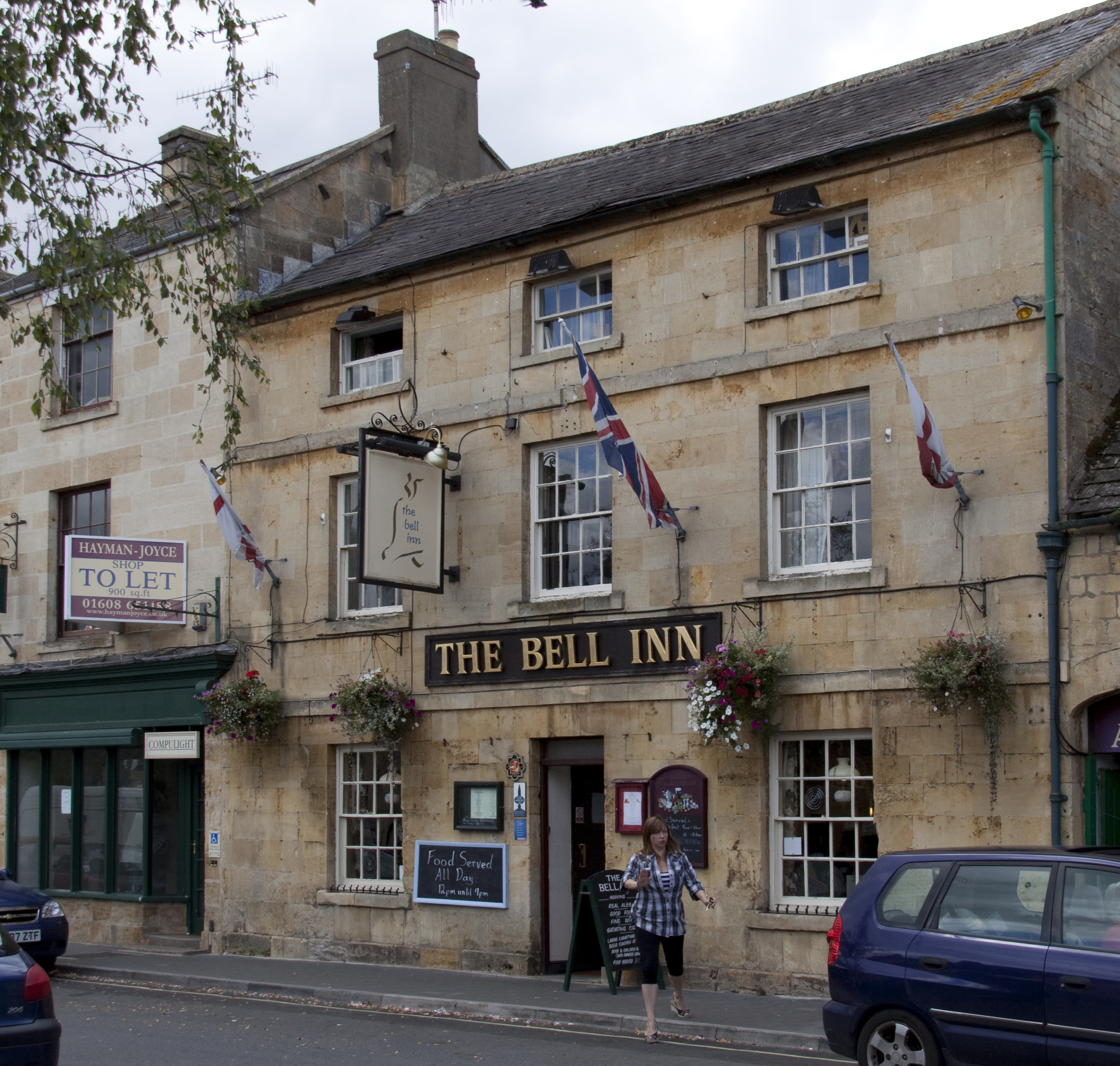
Research by a branch of the Tolkien Society indicates that the Bell Inn was a source of inspiration for the Prancing Pony.

The Bell is an eighteenth-century inn on the western side of the High Street. It was regularly visited by author J. R. R. Tolkien during his early years at the University of Oxford. The inn has been attributed as inspiration for The Prancing Pony which features in The Lord of the Rings (1954–1955).

The 300-year-old Black Bear Inn, on the eastern side of the High Street near the Curfew Tower, has enjoyed a long association with football. An ex-professional footballer, landlord Jim Steele, was in the Southampton team that famously beat favourites Manchester United in the 1976 FA Cup Final. Chelsea legend Peter Osgood, who was also in the winning Southampton side, was a great friend of Jim and often visited the Black Bear before he died in March 2006.

== Media ==
Local news and television programmes are provided by BBC West Midlands and ITV Central. Television signals are received from the Lark Stoke TV transmitter.

The town is served by both BBC CWR and BBC Radio Gloucestershire. Other radio stations including Heart West, Greatest Hits Radio South West, Capital Mid-Counties, Corinium Radio and Cotswolds Radio, community based radio station.

The town is served by the weekly local newspaper, Wilts and Gloucestershire Standard.

== Sport ==
The town also has its own non league football club, Moreton Rangers who currently play in the Hellenic Football League at the London Road ground. The Batsford Road cricket ground was opened in 1859 and has hosted first-class and List A cricket for Gloucestershire County Cricket Club.

== Notable residents ==
- Nicholas John Anstee (1958–), 682nd Lord Mayor of London.
- Sir Charles Cockerell (1755–1837), 1st baronet of Sezincote House, Moreton-in-Marsh.
- Dame Prue Leith (1940–), restaurateur, chef and television presenter/broadcaster.
- Penelope Mortimer (1919-1999), journalist, biographer and novelist.
- John Sankey, 1st Viscount Sankey (1866–1948), Labour politician, Lord Chancellor 1929–1935.
- Jim Steele (1950–), ex-Dundee and Southampton footballer, won the 1976 FA Cup Final with Southampton.
- William Towns (1936–1993), 20th century car designer.
- Mark Williams (1959–), actor, screenwriter and presenter.

== Sources ==
- Elrington, C.R., ed. (1965). Victoria County History: A History of the County of Gloucester, Volume 6. pp. 24–250.
- Mills, A.D.; Room, A. (2003). A Dictionary of British Place-Names. Oxford: Oxford University Press. ISBN 0-19-852758-6.
- Verey, David (1970). The Buildings of England: Gloucestershire: The Cotswolds. Harmondsworth: Penguin Books. pp. 323–326. ISBN 0-14-071040-X.
