= Shaun Gorman =

English cricketer

Personal information
- Full name: Shaun Rodney Gorman
- Born: 28 April 1965 (age 61); Middlesbrough, Yorkshire, England
- Batting: Right-handed
- Bowling: Right-arm off break

Domestic team information
- Years: Team
- 1985–1987: Cambridge University

Career statistics
Competition	First-class
Matches	22
Runs scored	370
Batting average	14.23
100s/50s	–/–
Top score	43*
Balls bowled	1,000
Wickets	5
Bowling average	129.80
5 wickets in innings	–
10 wickets in match	–
Best bowling	1/27
Catches/stumpings	11/–
- Source: Cricinfo, 13 January 2022

Shaun Rodney Gorman (born 28 April 1965) is an English former first-class cricketer.

Gorman was born in Middlesbrough in April 1965. He was educated in York at St Peter's School, before going up to Emmanuel College, Cambridge. While studying at Cambridge, he played first-class cricket for Cambridge University Cricket Club from 1985 to 1987, making 22 appearances. He scored 370 runs in his 22 matches at an average of 14.23, with a highest score of 43 not out. He struggled as an off break bowler against first-class county opposition, bowling 166 overs in which he took 5 wickets.
