= Batsford Road =

Cricket ground in England

- Interactive map of Batsford Road

Ground information
- Location: Moreton-in-Marsh, Gloucestershire
- Country: England
- Coordinates: 51.9943°N 1.7067°W
- Establishment: 1856
- Capacity: 5,000
- End names
- Batsford Road End; Pavilion End

Team information
| Gloucestershire | (1884–1996) |
- As of 11 September 2010; Source: Ground profile

Batsford Road, sometimes known as Moreton-in-Marsh Cricket Club Ground, is a cricket ground in Moreton-in-Marsh, Gloucestershire. The ground is located off the Batsford Road as it leaves Moreton-in-Marsh. It played host to first-class and List A cricket matches for Gloucestershire County Cricket Club between 1884 and 1996.

== History ==
Moreton-in-Marsh Cricket Club was founded in 1856, with the club having played at the ground since. The land on which the ground was constructed was originally owned by Baron Redesdale of the Mitford family. The ground played a role in popularising croquet, hosting the Croquet Open Championship in 1867, which was won by the pioneer of the sport Walter Whitmore, and hosting the first all-comers meeting for the sport in 1868. Gloucestershire first played first-class cricket at the ground in 1884 against Yorkshire, with the Gloucestershire side being captained by W. G. Grace. In 1886, Gloucestershire played Nottinghamshire there, with Nottinghamshire captain Arthur Shrewsbury making an unbeaten double-century. Gloucestershire played one first-class match there a year until 1888, before returning to the ground in 1914 when they played Worcestershire in the County Championship, with this match being notable for Arthur Conway's 15 wickets in the match. With the advent of List A one-day cricket, Gloucestershire returned to the ground after a 58 year absence when they played Hampshire in the 1972 Benson & Hedges Cup. Gloucestershire played one one-day match per season there until 1996 (with the exception of 1982 and 1995), mostly in the Sunday League.

The ground originally did not have a pavilion, with club members deciding to purchase a tent to serve the purpose in the year the ground opened. A pavilion was constructed in 1925, The club spent money on improving drainage, which had become a problem following heavy rain. Matches at Batsford Road were well attended, with crowds of 4,500–5,000 attending for county matches; these were helped by Gloucestershire scheduling fixtures against Worcestershire, Warwickshire and Northamptonshire, whose county headquarters were all closer to Moreton-in-Marsh than Gloucestershire's own headquarters at Bristol was, therefore attracting a large number of visiting spectators. The ground also has facilities for tennis and field hockey. The ground is also the subject of a painting by the artist and former Gloucestershire cricketer Jack Russell.

== Records ==
=== First-class ===
- Highest team total: 448 all out by Gloucestershire v Somerset, 1885
- Lowest team total: 28 all out by Kent v Gloucestershire, 1888
- Highest individual innings: 227 not out by Arthur Shrewsbury for Nottinghamshire v Gloucestershire, 1886
- Best bowling in an innings: 9-38 by Arthur Conway, for Worcestershire v Gloucestershire, 1914
- Best bowling in a match: 15-87 by Arthur Conway, as above

=== List A ===
- Highest team total: 269 for 8 by Gloucestershire v Kent, 1988
- Lowest team total: 70 all out by Gloucestershire v Warwickshire, 1972
- Highest individual innings: 121 not out by Bill Athey for Gloucestershire v Worcestershire, 1985
- Best bowling in an innings: 5-23 by Tim Munton, for Warwickshire v Gloucestershire, 1990
