= James Turner (architect) =

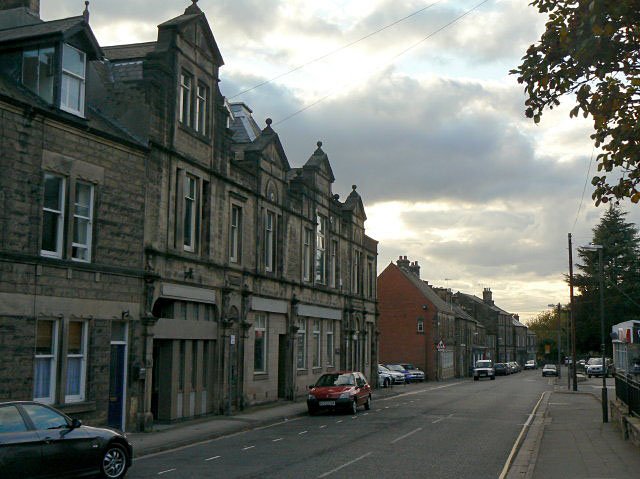
Former Co-operative Store, Smedley Street, Matlock 1891

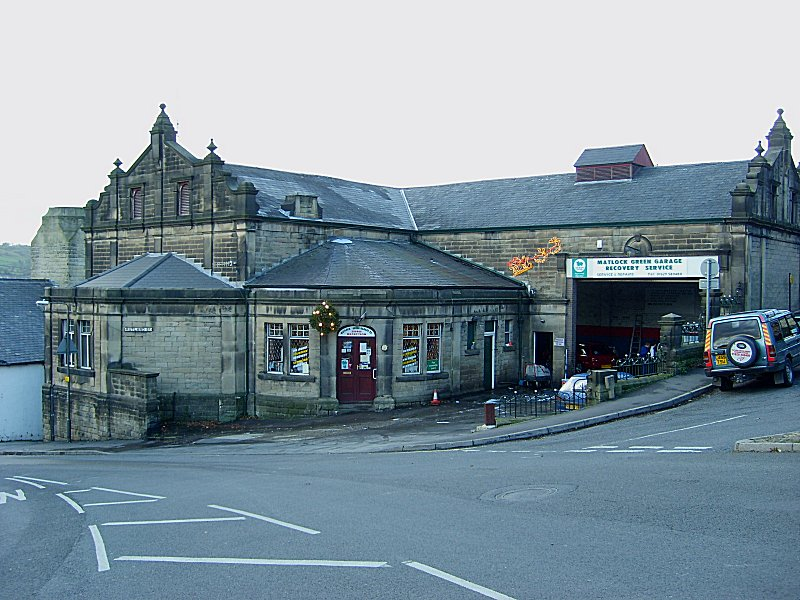
Matlock Cable Tramway depot 1893

James Turner (c. 1852 – 12 October 1899) was a British architect based in Matlock.

== History ==
He was born in New Mills, Derbyshire around 1852, the son of Thomas B Turner and Mary. With his wife Elizabeth, he had 5 sons:

- Thomas B Turner (1877-1888)
- James Parson Turner (b. 1879)
- Joseph Turner (1881-1957)
- Frederick Turner (1883-1963)
- John Edward Turner (b. 1885)
- Samuel William Turner (b. 1888)

Until 1893 he was in partnership with George Robert Hall in Matlock as Architects, Surveyors and Estate Agents, as Turner and Hall.

He died on 12 October 1899 and left an estate valued at £159 14s (equivalent to £22,700 in 2023).

== Works ==
- Day Schools, Tansley, Derbyshire 1889 enlargement
- Co-operative Store, Matlock Bank Industrial and Provident Society, Smedley Street, Matlock 1891
- Church Schools, South Darley, Derbyshire 1892 Enlargement
- Depot for Matlock Cable Tramway 1893
- Bank House Hydro, Matlock 1894
- Pavilion, Swimming Bath and Gardens, Matlock 1894-95
- Matlock Board School, School Road, Matlock Bank 1897
