= Matlock Cable Tramway =

Cable tramway in Matlock, Derbyshire, England

Coordinates: 53.1405°N 1.5526°W

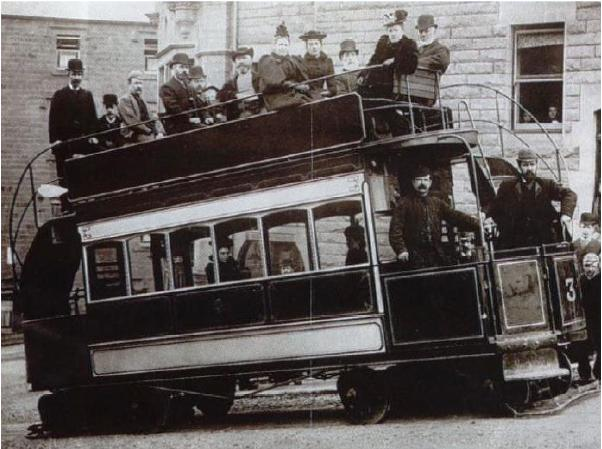
- Tram on Bank Road.

Operation
- Locale: Matlock, Derbyshire, UK
- Open: 28 March 1893
- Close: 30 September 1927
- Status: Closed

Infrastructure
- Track gauge: 1,435 mm (4 ft 8 1/2 in)
- Propulsion system: Cable
- Depot: Rutland Street

Statistics
- Route length: 0.75 miles (1.21 km)

Matlock Cable Tramway was a cable tramway that served the town of Matlock, Derbyshire, UK between 28 March 1893 and 30 September 1927.

== History ==
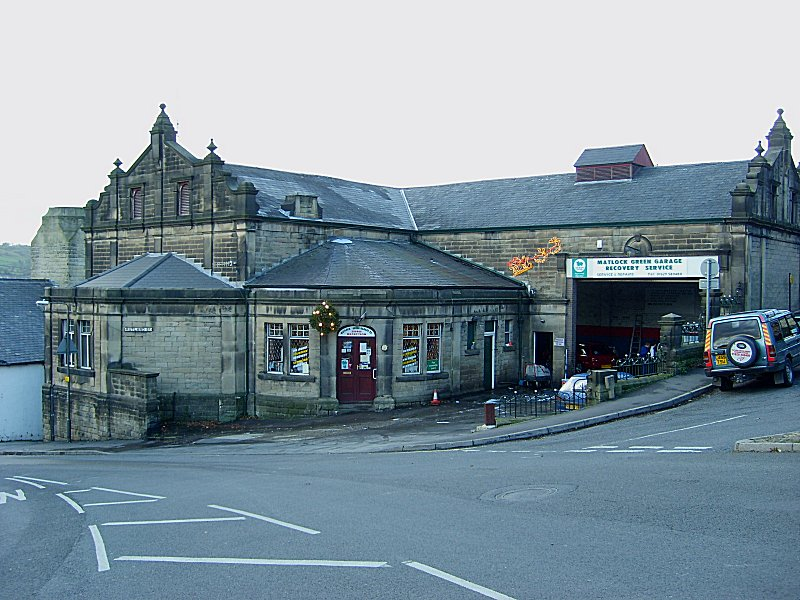
Tramway barn in 2006.

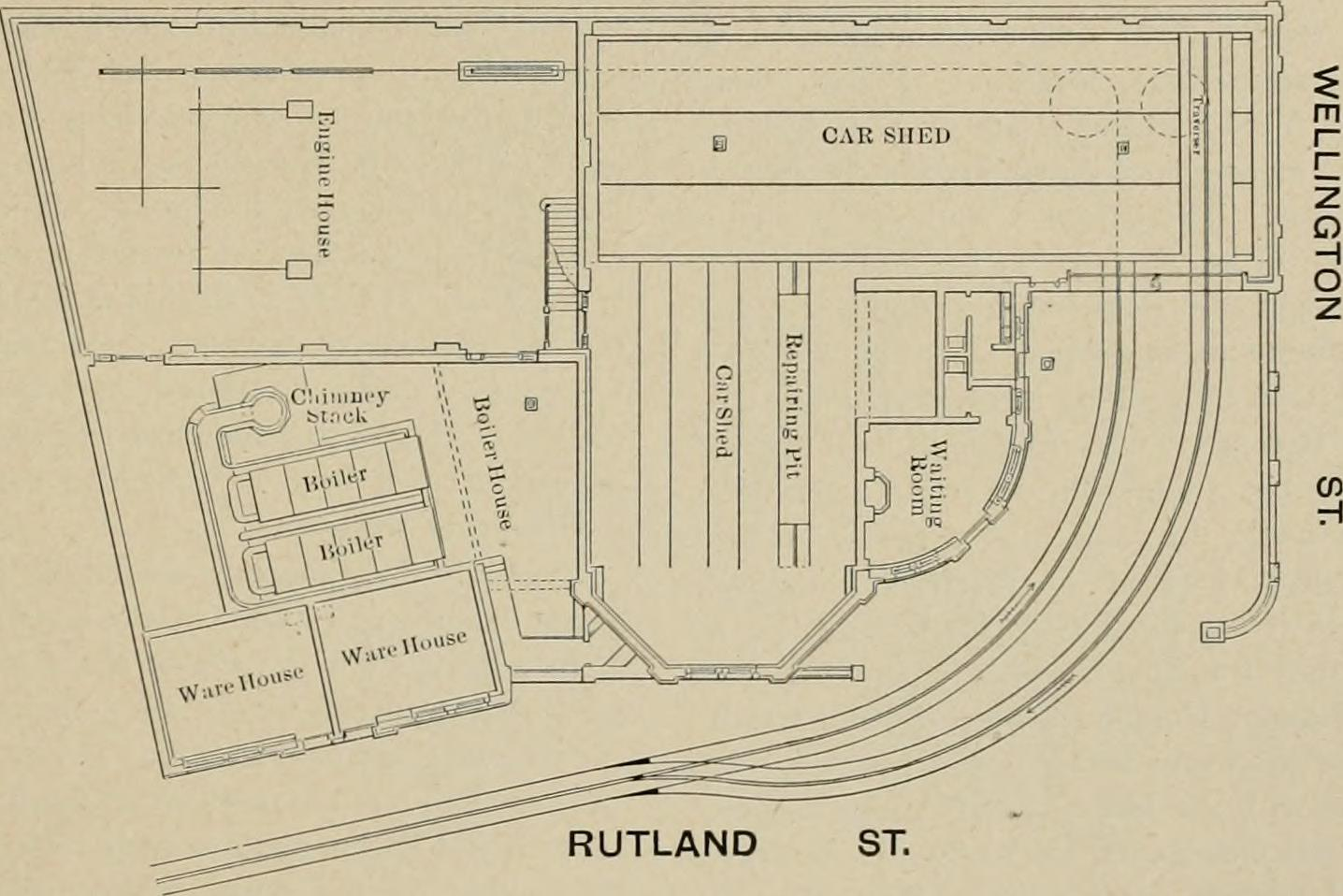
Tramway barn plan in 1893.

The principal purpose was to serve the Hydro Spa Hotels, bringing customers from the railway station near the River Derwent. One of the tramway's directors, Job Smith got the idea for a steep-gradient tram for Matlock while in San Francisco in 1862. The original plan for the tramway was to run between Matlock railway station and the Hydro Spa Hotels of Smedley's and Rockside. The risk of flooding forced the terminus to be set up on Crown Square.

The tramway was financed by locally born newspaper owner Sir George Newnes, at a cost of £20,000 (equivalent to £2,222,000 in 2025). The tram depot was designed by the architect James Turner, with a chimney 100 feet (30 m) high. The engine-house was 60 feet (18 m) by 38 feet (12 m), the boiler-house 54 feet (16 m) by 25 feet (7.6 m), a car pit 74 feet (23 m) by 33 feet (10 m), a waiting room 16 feet (4.9 m) by 16 feet (4.9 m) with ladies’ and gentlemen's retiring rooms, and two warehouses as lock-up shops. This was all erected for the sum of £2,600. The boilers were by L. T. Wildgoose, the building contractor was W. Knowles and Sons, the sub-contractors were Soter and Derbyshire. The cable machinery, tramway and vehicles were supplied by Dick Kerr and Company. The engineer for the line was George Croydon Marks, 1st Baron Marks, the consulting engineer W. R. Colan, and the resident engineer was Edward C. R. Marks.

The line was inspected by Major General Charles Scrope Hutchinson of the Board of Trade on 1 March 1893 and services started on 28 March 1893. It was the steepest tramway in the world on public roads, featuring a 1 in 5½ grade slope (18%). The tramcars had no independent power but were pulled by a cable situated below and between the tracks.

The depot was situated on Rutland Street and contained a boiler and a stationary steam engine, which pulled the cable and lifted the trams 300 feet up Bank Road. Fares used to be Tuppence up, Penny Down. Bank Road was not wide enough for two tracks, so a single track was used, with a passing place where the trams met. The up and down cables had to run in the same tube between the rails. The trams averaged 5½ mph, and had the advantage of the down-tram balancing the up-tram, and saving power in the depot steam engine. A spare tram was kept in the depot.

In 1898 Sir George Newnes gave the tramway as a gift to Matlock District Council.

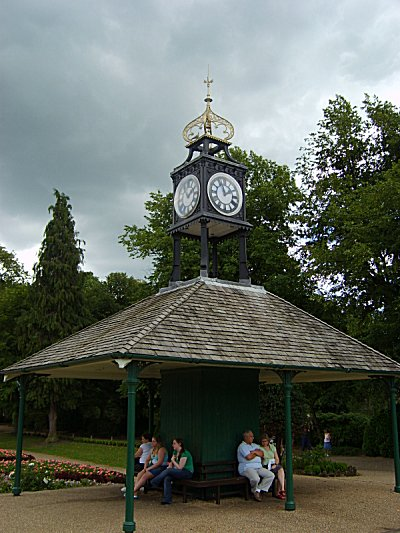
Preserved tram stop in Hall Leys Park.

The tram shelter and clock tower in Crown Square were the gift of R. Wildgoose JP and opened on 12 December 1899.

In the calendar year 1900, it was reported that the receipts were £1,139 12s 11d, and the expenses were £1,191 14s 0d, a loss of £52 1s 1d.

In 1912 the service was suspended for three days because of a break in a strand in the cable. One of the tramcars had failed to take the points of the loop at the bottom of the line, and was derailed. The driver of the following tram pulled up at the Crown Hotel and alighted from his tram. The tram restarted on its own account and crashed into the derailed car. During the subsequent investigation it was discovered that a strand in the cable had snapped.

In the 1920s the losses sustained by the tramway were reported as 1921 - £2,920 (equivalent to £123,600 in 2025), 1922 - £1,260 (equivalent to £61,900 in 2025), 1923 - £205 (equivalent to £10,700 in 2025), 1924 - £1,120 (equivalent to £58,900 in 2025). The council decided in 1927 to replace the tramway with motor bus operation, and tramway services ended on 30 September 1927. The council agreed in February 1928 to put the tramway up for sale.

The tram shelter from Crown Square has been preserved, and is now standing at the head of Hall Leys Park.
