= Bank Road =

Road in Matlock, Derbyshire, England

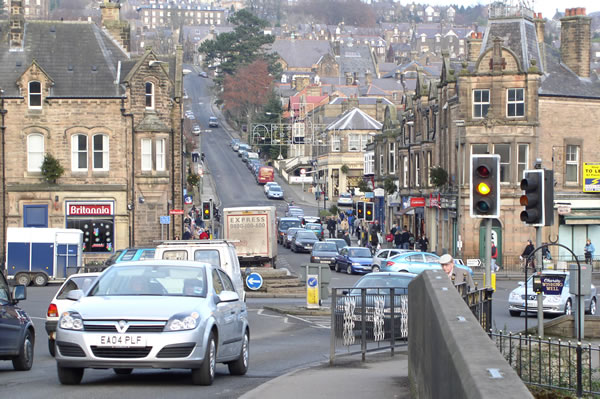
Looking up Bank Road from Matlock Bridge across Crown Square

Bank Road is a road in Matlock, Derbyshire which runs from Crown Square up Matlock Bank, a steep hill which gives the road its name, to Wellington Street. Although many consider the whole incline to be Bank Road, beyond Smedley Street, just over halfway up, the road is called Rutland Street.

== Tram ==
In 1893 a cable tramway was built along Bank Road. Halfway up there was a stop at Smedley Street where Smedley's Hydro (built by John Smedley) was situated. Conceived by Job Smith, the tram was inspired by San Francisco's famous cable cars, and cost £20,000. When it was built it was the steepest tramway in the world at a gradient of 1 in 5½, and it rose 300 feet. The fare was tuppence up, penny down. It closed in 1927 after losing business to cars and buses.

== Landmarks ==
Bank Road has many local landmark buildings along it – from the bottom of the hill (Crown Square) travelling north:

- The Crown Hotel – the original site of the hotel which gave its name to Crown Square is now a building society office. The Crown is now a Wetherspoon's pub just along Bakewell Road.
- Post Office and Sorting Office
- Derbyshire Dales District Council Offices – the home of Derbyshire Dales District Council.
- Our Lady & St. Joseph's Catholic Church
- Youth Hostel – a YHA youth hostel – in 2005 it was announced that this will be closed.
- Matlock Methodist & United Reformed Church
- Old Sunday School which is now private homes.
- Old Methodist Church which, until recently, housed the Matlock Wurlitzer.
- County Hall – the home of Derbyshire County Council since the 1950s, formerly Smedley's Hydro. Part of the County Hall complex is seen in Women in Love, Ken Russell's Oscar-winning 1969 film. As the Brangwen sisters walk out of their house (in reality No. 80, New Street) near the beginning of the film they are seen walking towards Bank Road.
- Smedley Street which traverses Matlock Bank and has its own parade of shops and a post office.
- The Gate public house

NB. Beyond Smedley Street Bank Road is actually Rutland Street.

- The Old Tram Depot which is now a garage and car repair centre.
- Rockside Hydro an imposing building with views across Matlock. It is currently being converted into flats.
