= Matlock, Derbyshire =

County town of Derbyshire, England

Coordinates: 53.14°N 1.55°W

Matlock
- Town
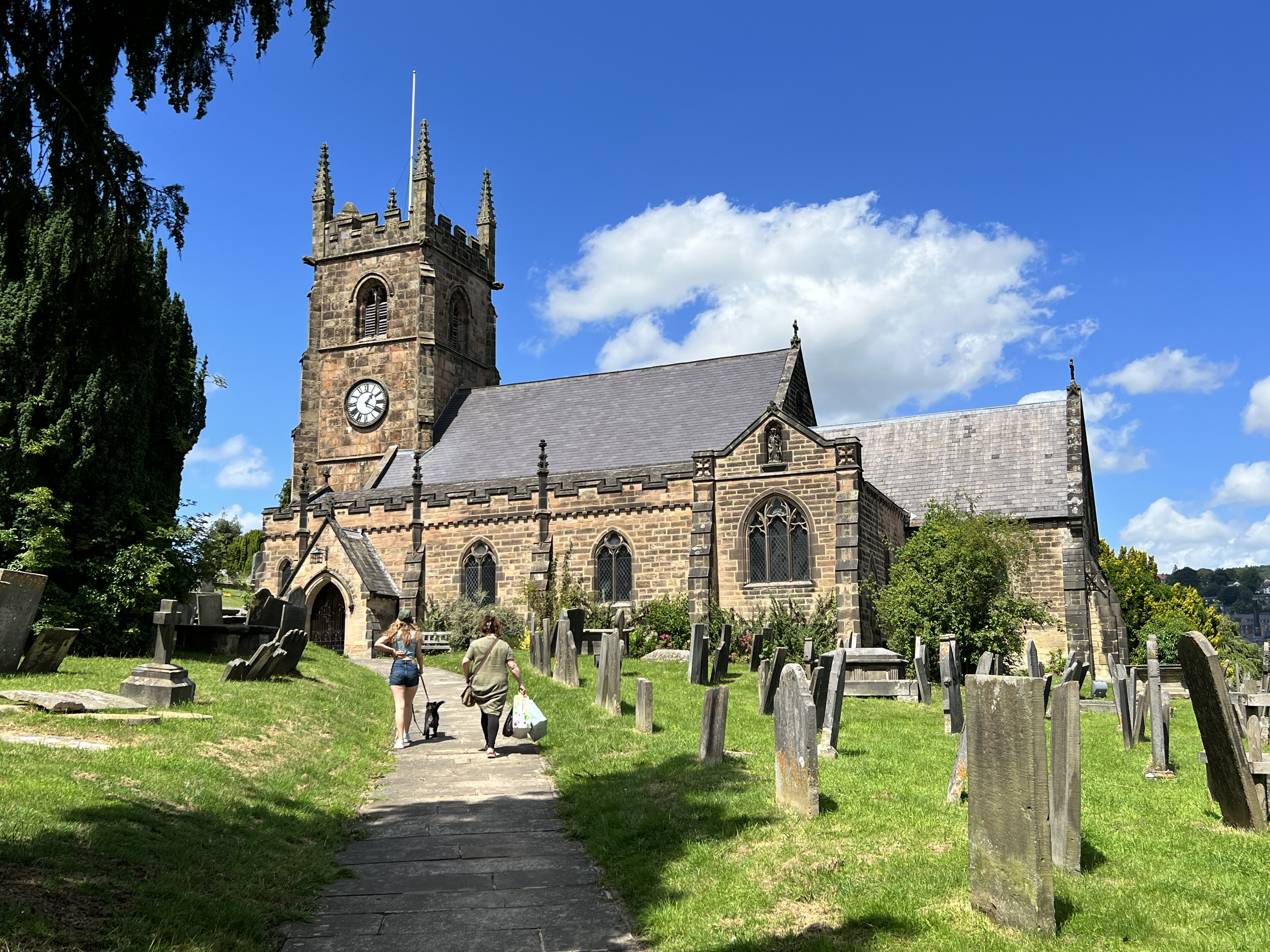
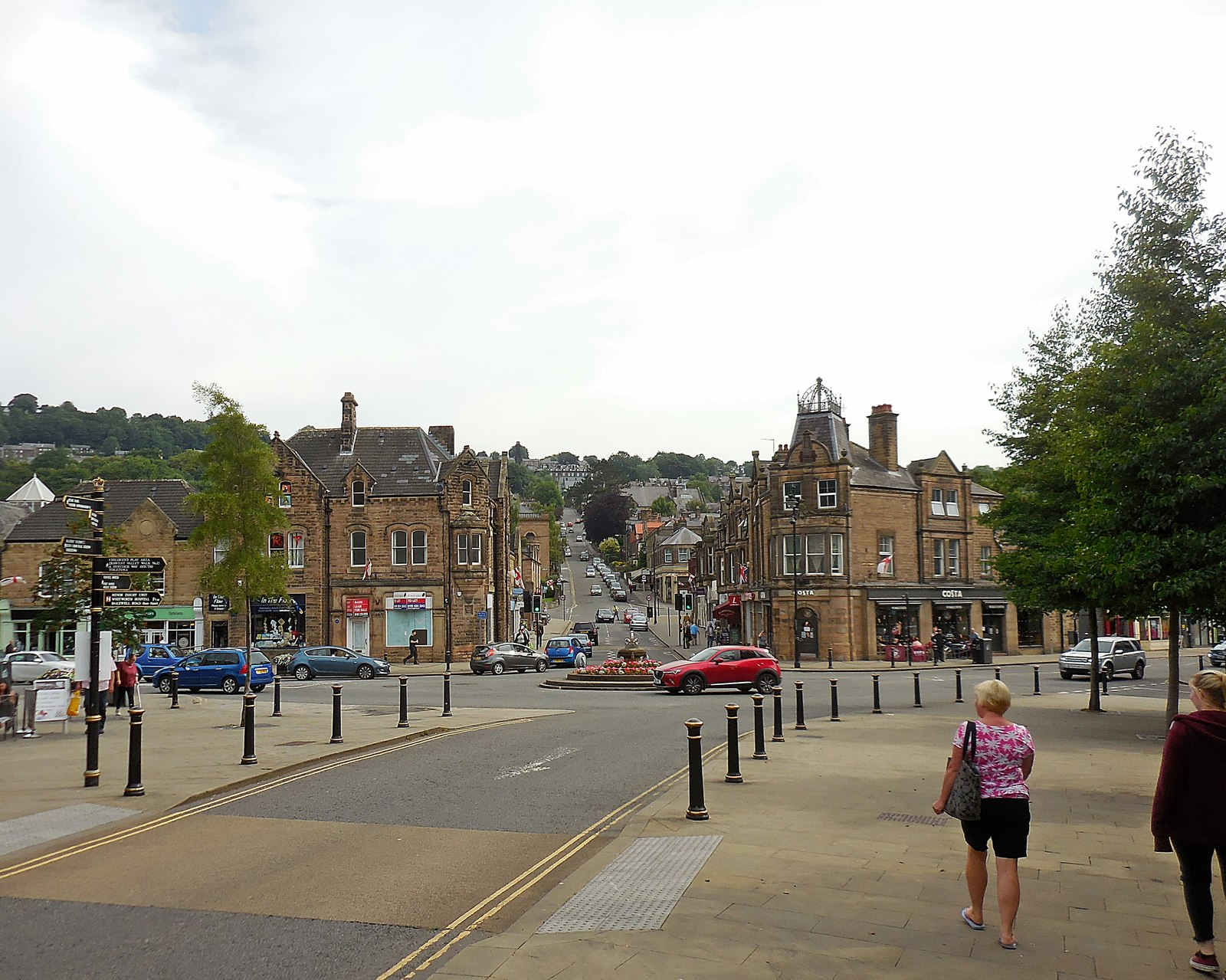
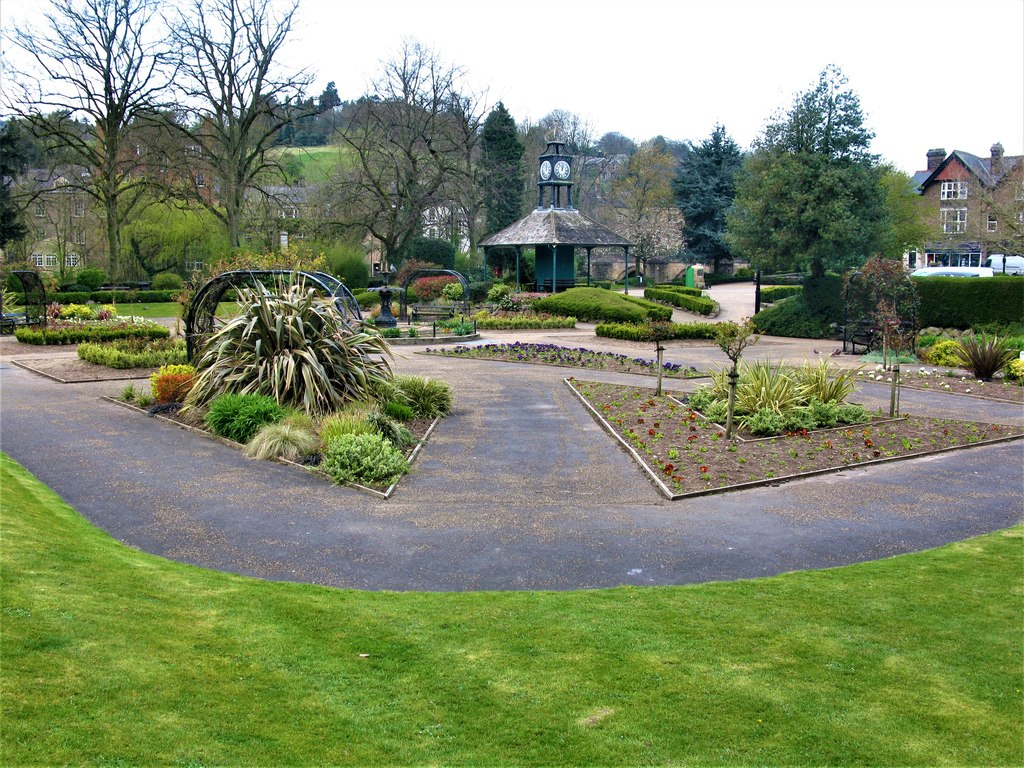
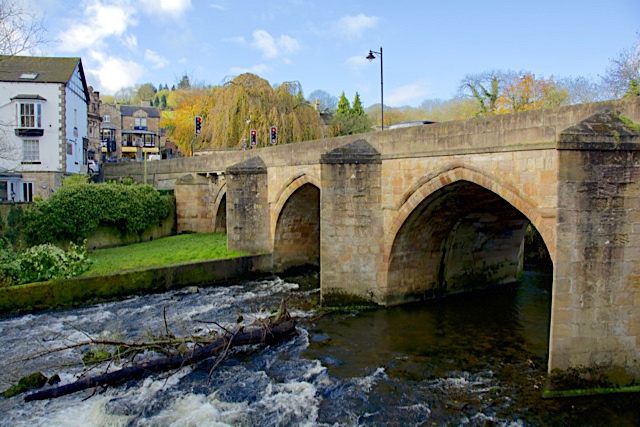
- St Giles Church Crown Square Hall Ley's Park The Bridge

- Location within Derbyshire
- Population: 11,986 (Census 2021)
- OS grid reference: SK298601
- Civil parish: Matlock Town
- District: Derbyshire Dales
- Shire county: Derbyshire
- Region: East Midlands
- Country: England
- Sovereign state: United Kingdom
- Post town: MATLOCK
- Postcode district: DE4
- Dialling code: 01629
- Police: Derbyshire
- Fire: Derbyshire
- Ambulance: East Midlands
- UK Parliament: Derbyshire Dales
- Website: matlock.gov.uk

Matlock is the county town of Derbyshire, England. It is in the south-eastern part of the Peak District, with the National Park directly to the west. The spa resort of Matlock Bath is immediately south of the town as well as Cromford lying further south still. The civil parish of Matlock Town had a population in the 2021 UK census of 10,000.

Matlock is 9 miles (14 km) south-west of Chesterfield and in close reach of the cities of Derby (19 miles), Sheffield (20 miles) and Nottingham (29 miles). Matlock is within the Derbyshire Dales district and is the headquarters of Derbyshire County Council.

== History ==
The name Matlock derives from the Old English mæthel (or mæðel), meaning assembly or speech, and āc, meaning oak tree; thus Matlock means 'moot-oak', an oak tree where meetings are held. In the Domesday Book of 1086 it was recorded as Meslach and in 1196 it was named Matlac. It is a former spa town that lies on the River Derwent, and has prospered from both the hydrotherapy industry and the cloth mills constructed on the river and its tributary Bentley Brook.

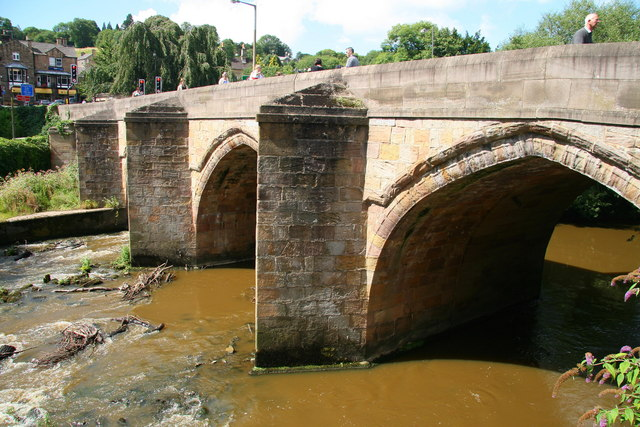
The 15th-century Matlock Bridge

It was a collection of villages in Wirksworth Hundred – composed of Matlock Town, Matlock Green, Matlock Bridge, Matlock Bank – until thermal springs were discovered in 1698. The population increased rapidly in the 1800s, largely because of the popular hydros that were being built. At one stage there were around twenty hydros, mostly on Matlock Bank, the largest built in 1853 by John Smedley. This closed in 1955, and re-opened in 1956 as the headquarters of the Derbyshire County Council. Matlock is also home to the Derbyshire Dales District Council as well as Matlock Town council.

== Governance ==
Matlock has a town council, the urban equivent of the rural parish council and the lowest tier of local government. The Council meets twice a month. There are 11 Councillors who cover the area and 9 members of staff. Matlock Town Council's jurisdiction extends to the town centre, Matlock Bank, Hurst Farm, Matlock Green, Matlock Town, Starkholmes and Riber.

The second tier of local government is Derbyshire Dales District Council, which covers almost a third of the mainly rural parts of the county, including the towns of Matlock, Ashbourne, Bakewell, Wirksworth and Darley Dale and over 100 villages. The council has 39 District Councillors elected in 25 wards. Matlock is represented by six councillors in the two wards: Matlock All Saints and Matlock St Giles.

The top tier of local government is Derbyshire County Council, which has responsibilities for the whole of Derbyshire apart from the City of Derby. Matlock is represented by one county councillor (out of 64 councillors in total).

The main offices of all three tiers of local government are sited in Matlock. The Town Council is housed in the Imperial Rooms close to the bottom of Bank Road, the District Council is halfway up Bank Road and the County Council is at the top.

As regards national democracy, Matlock forms part of the parliamentary constituency of Derbyshire Dales. The MP is currently John Whitby, who was elected in the 2024 General Election.

== Geography ==
=== Natural physical features ===
The main physical features of the Matlock area are the hills and watercourses. The height of the town (above mean level) varies from 91m at Causeway Lane (in the valley bottom) to 203m at the top of Wellington Street. Matlock is overlooked by Riber Castle at 260m from the south-east and by Masson Hill at 339m from the south-west. The first human settlement in the area was in what is now known as Old Matlock or Matlock Green. This was where the Bentley Brook joined the River Derwent. When the town grew in the late 19th century, the town spread up the steep hillsides to the north-east of the narrow valley bottom.

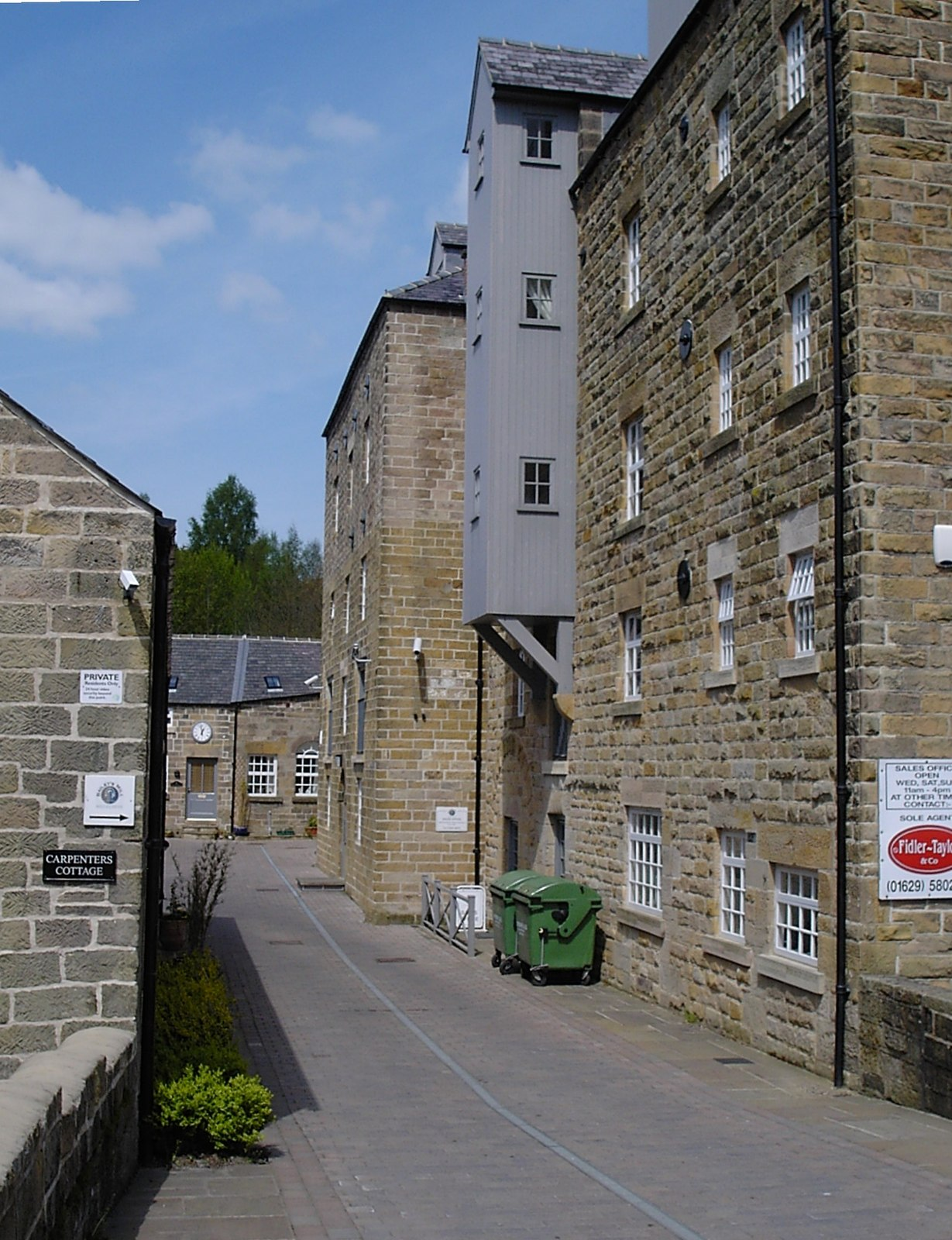
Baileys (corn) Mill on Bentley Brook

Various industries made use of the natural features:

- The underlying bedrock was quarried and mined.
- The watercourses were harnessed to power corn mills, cloth mills, and other mills.
- The hillside thermal spring water gave rise to the hydros.

The natural features also constrained transport links:

- In the Derwent gorge below High Tor, the present-day A6 (Dale Road) was squeezed in beside the river.
- From the south, the Midland Railway reached Matlock Station via a series of short tunnels constructed under the limestone of the gorge.
- A cable tramway was constructed to tackle the very steep Bank Road (see above).

=== Geology ===
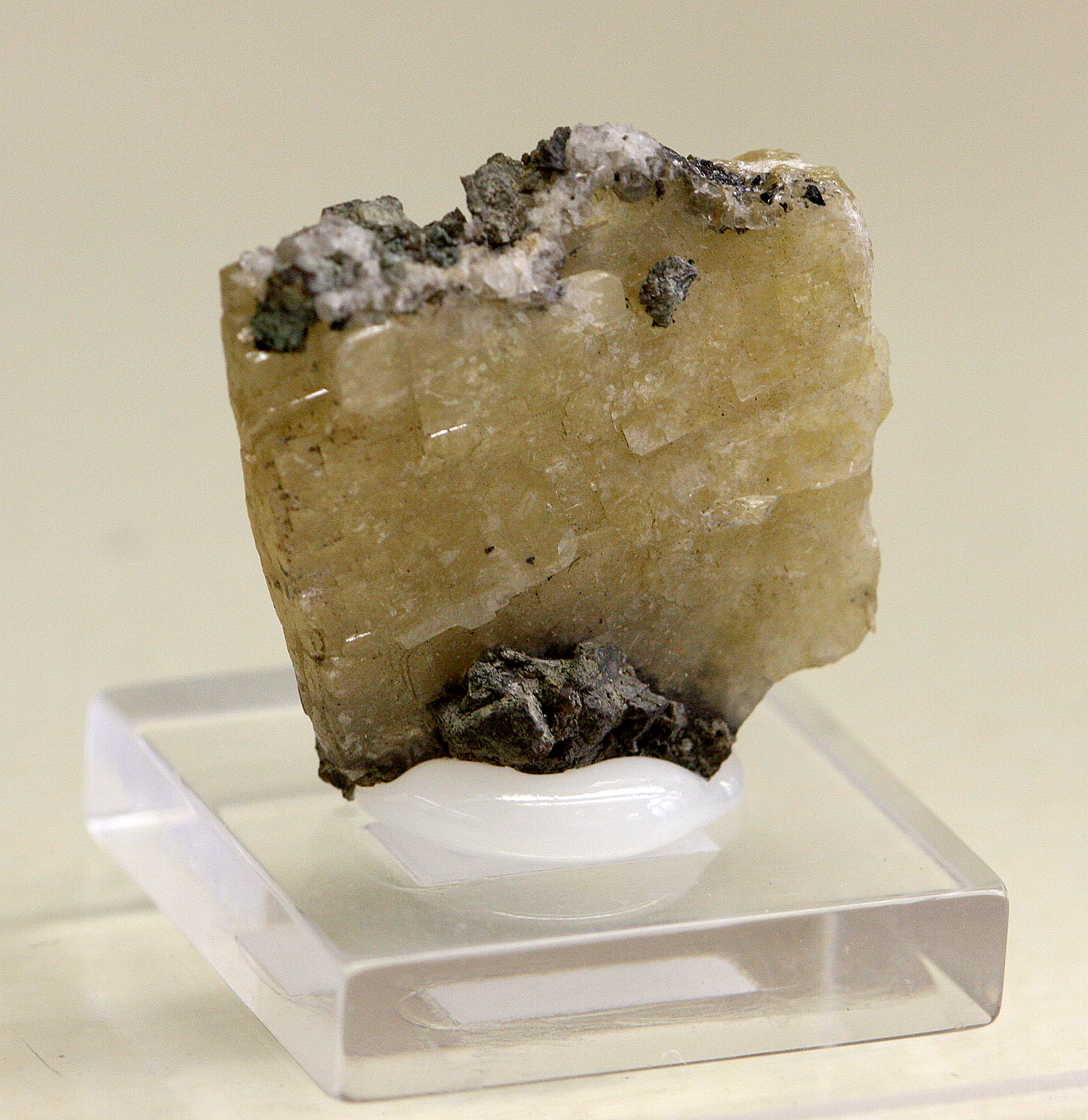
Specimen of Matlockite in the Mineralogical Museum, Bonn, Germany

The geology of the Matlock area is extremely complex. Broadly speaking, the Derwent valley bottom forms a boundary between the sandstones and gritstones of the Dark Peak to the north-east and the limestones of the White Peak to the south-west. There are igneous intrusions into the limestones to the south-west.

This geology has been exploited by the quarrying and mining industries. The sandstones and gritstones have been quarried as building materials (e.g. at Bentley Brook Quarries) and the limestones for building materials and the manufacture of lime (e.g. at Harvey Dale Quarries). The igneous intrusions gave rise to valuable minerals which have been mined (e.g. in the Bonsall area), particularly for lead. A very rare lead halide mineral called Matlockite was first discovered at nearby Bage Mine in the early 1800s, and is named after the town.

The route of the River Derwent downstream (south) of Matlock is especially interesting to geologists in that it has cut its way through a limestone gorge below High Tor (120m above river level), rather than follow the "simpler" way to the east. It is thought that landslips and/or glaciation may have had an influence over how the present route of the river was established.

=== The Dimple ===
The area on the western edge of the town, bounded on the north and east by Old Hackney Lane, Hurds Hollow, and Dimple Road, and on the south by Bakewell Road, is named as Dimple, on the Ordnance Survey map.

=== Flooding ===
The Derwent has occasionally flooded, including during November 2019 when large areas of England were affected. This flood in particular claimed one life: that of Matlock's former high sheriff, Annie Hall, who was swept away by the water and subsequently drowned, aged 69. This flood also caused damage to many of Matlock's businesses, including the local Wetherspoons, which was forced to close due to the damages and later reopened as Ostello Lounge, part of the Lounges group, in March 2022.

== Transport ==
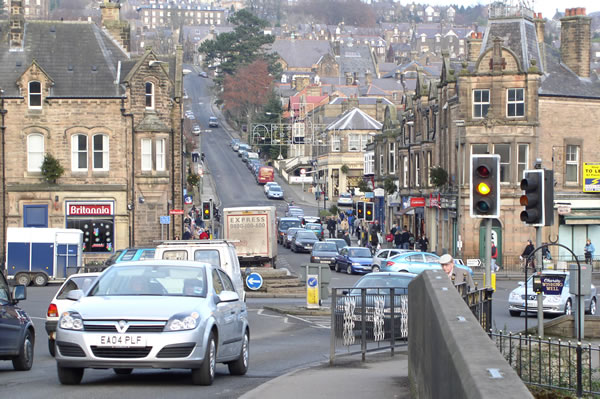
Matlock taken from Matlock Bridge – looking up the hill of Bank Road across Crown Square (prior to bridge one way system)

=== Railways ===
National Rail services run generally hourly each way between Matlock and Derby on the Derwent Valley Line, operated by East Midlands Railway.

==== History ====
In 1849, the railway came to Matlock. Matlock railway station was opened on the Manchester, Buxton, Matlock and Midlands Junction Railway, later the Midland line between London and Manchester, until the section between Matlock and Buxton was closed in 1968 following the Beeching cuts. Network Rail has considered re-opening the line, with a study carried out by the county council; although it proved to be unfeasible in the short term, the track bed will be kept free of development as the study showed that the line could be economically viable from around 2025. The section from Wye Dale (about 3 miles (4.8 km) east of Buxton) to Coombs viaduct, a point about a mile south-east of Bakewell, has now become the Monsal Trail, an 8.5-mile (13.7 km) walking and cycle trail.

==== Heritage ====
Peak Rail emblem

Peak Rail, a preserved railway, runs steam trains on a section of the closed line between Matlock, Darley Dale and Rowsley. Previously it used its own station, Matlock Riverside, a short distance to the north of the mainline station; however, from 2011, both Peak Rail and trains on the Derwent Valley Line share the same station.

=== Buses ===
The town is well served by bus routes, operated by Trent Barton and Stagecoach Yorkshire.

=== Roads ===
The A6, which links Carlisle with Luton, passes through the town; it provides access to Manchester, Stockport, Buxton, Bakewell and Derby.

=== Bank Road Tram ===
In 1893, Matlock Cable Tramway was built up Bank Road from Crown Square at Matlock Bridge to Wellington Street (at the top of Bank Road) with a stop halfway up at Smedley Street where Smedley's Hydro (built by John Smedley) was situated. Conceived by Job Smith, the tram was inspired by San Francisco's famous cable cars and cost £20,000. When it was built, it was the steepest tramway in the world at a gradient of 1 in 5½ and it rose 300 feet (91 m). The fare was tuppence up and one penny down. It closed in 1927, after losing business to cars and buses.

== Hall Leys Park ==
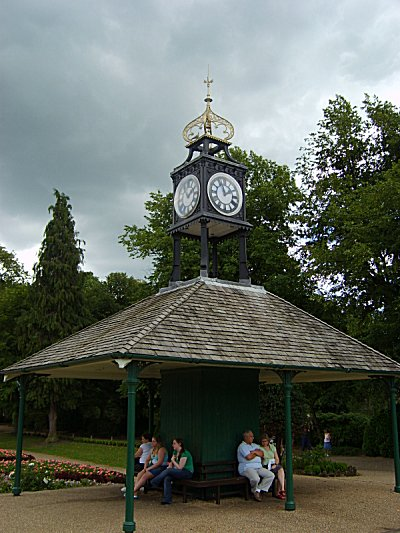
The old tram shelter in the park

Hall Leys Park is a Victorian public park in the centre of Matlock, Derbyshire which opened in 1898. It lies between the River Derwent to the south and Causeway Lane to the north. The park has many facilities and in 2004–2005 underwent major regeneration as part of the Matlock Parks Project with funding from the Millennium Commission.

At the Crown Square/Matlock Bridge end of the park there is the town's war memorial and a wishing well. Beside this there is the shelter from the former cable tramway which was moved to the park when the tramway ceased to operate in 1927.

Moving away from Crown Square there is, next, a large grass area and some tennis courts. As part of the refurbishments which took place, the old grass tennis courts were replaced with a skateboard park.

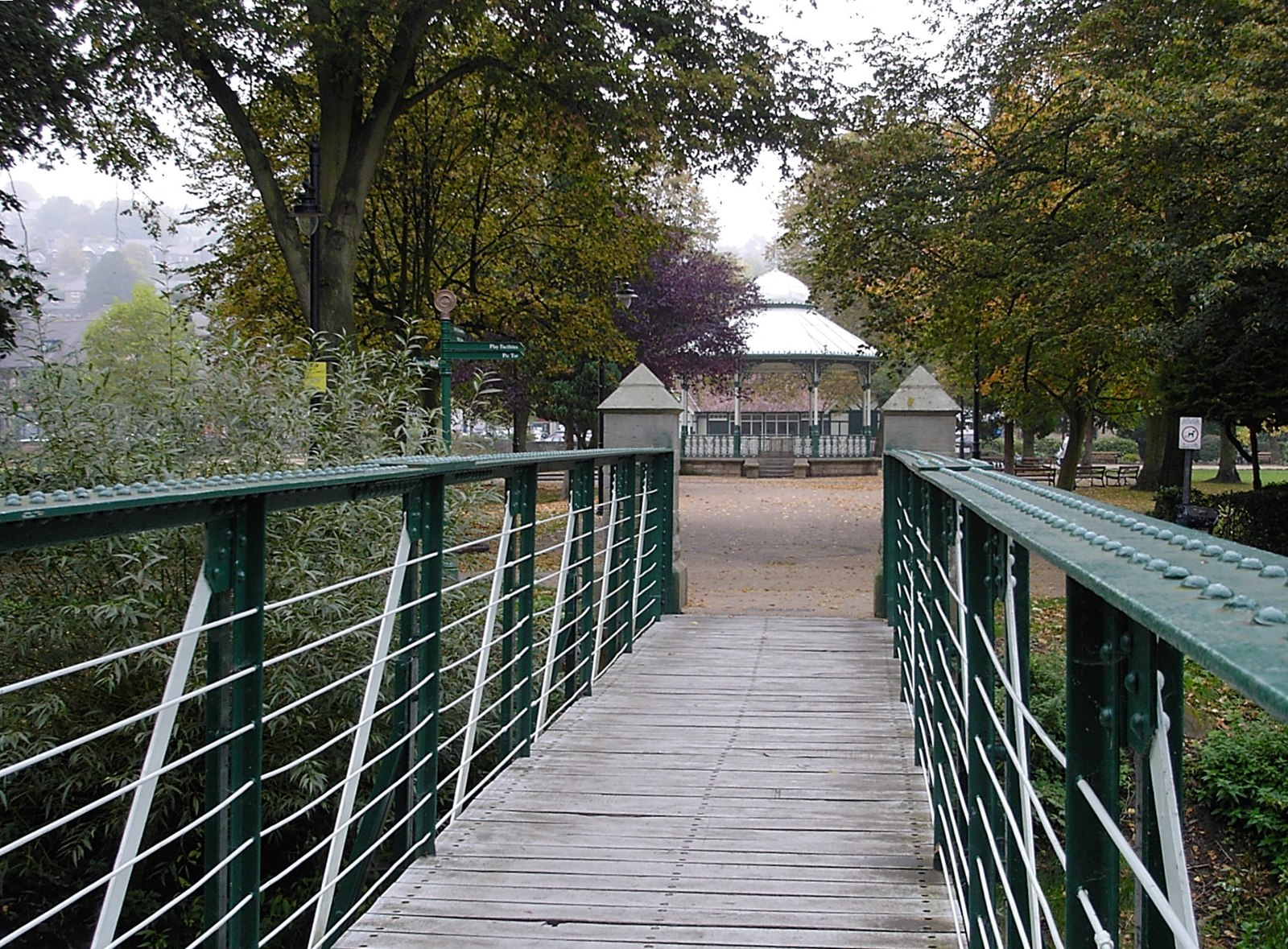
Hall Leys Park bandstand from footbridge over River Derwent

In the centre of the park is the Victorian bandstand, which is used regularly in the summer months by local brass bands and for events such as the annual Matlock Victorian Christmas Weekend, held on the first weekend of December. Beside the bandstand is a footbridge over the Derwent that has markings indicating the height of several floods that hit the town in the 1960s and 1970s. The café, on the opposite side of the bandstand, has similar markings for other floods.

Hall Leys Park is now a central part of the town's flood protection. The wall which surrounds the northern side of the park has the ability to have the footways sealed with sheets of wood which would dam the progress of any overflow from the river and turn the entire park into a large reservoir. Further down the park there is a putting green and a Crown Green Bowls green. A boating lake, with several small islands, is home to a large number of birds, including ducks and moorhens as well as being host to the longest-running pleasure boats in the country. A miniature railway runs half the length of the park along the river but, because of the lack of any turning space, the return journey is made in reverse. At the far end of the park is a children's playground, which was significantly upgraded in 2005.

Hall Leys Park is occasionally the site for visiting "Continental Markets" and, since the summer of 2006, regular "Farmers' Markets". It is also the centre of the Matlock Victorian Christmas Weekend, held annually on the first weekend of December.

== Bank Road ==
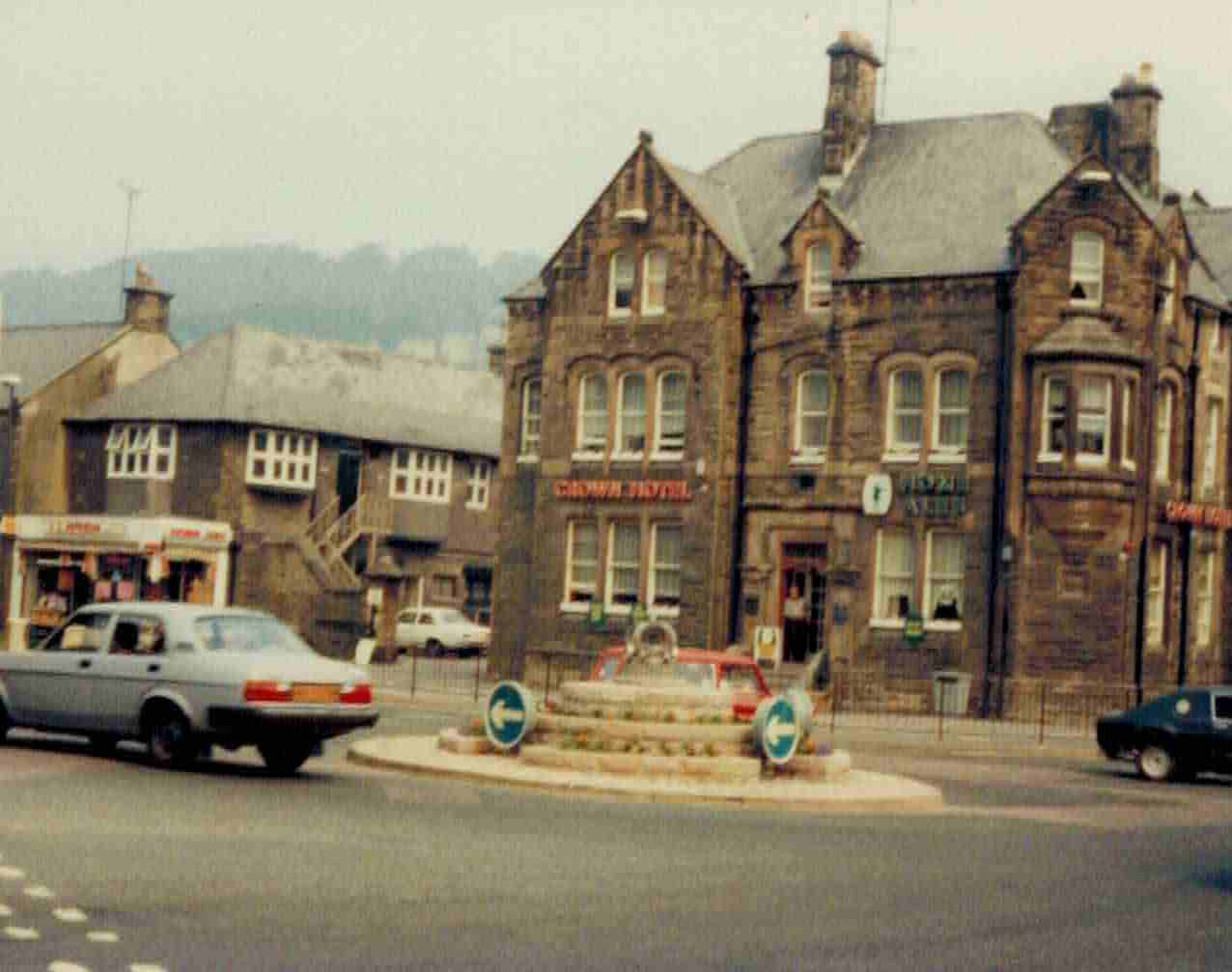
The Crown Hotel, left the "Ballroom" in 1980

Bank Road runs from Crown Square up Matlock Bank, a steep hill which gives the road its name, to Wellington Street. Although many consider the whole incline to be Bank Road, just over halfway up beyond Smedley Street the road is called Rutland Street. Bank Road has many local landmark buildings along it – from the bottom of the hill (Crown Square) travelling north:

- The Crown Hotel – the original site of the hotel which gave its name to Crown Square is now a building society office. This was built prior to 1899. The Crown was a Wetherspoon's pub just along Bakewell Road until the building was heavily damaged due to flooding in 2019.
- Crown Buildings, opposite the original Crown Hotel at the bottom of Bank Road, was built in 1889 and currently houses a café on its ground floor.
- Post Office and Sorting Office. These were built prior to 1922.
- Police Station – built after the second world war.
- Matlock Town Hall – formerly Bridge House. In 1894 the Matlock Urban District Council bought Bridge House for use as the town hall and added a large wing in the Italianate style to house an assembly room etc. It was reopened in 1898 and also housed most local authority undertakings, magistrates courts, etc. Following local government reorganisation in 1974, the Town Hall became the headquarters of West Derbyshire District Council (which later changed its name to Derbyshire Dales District Council).
- Our Lady & St. Joseph's Catholic Church – built in 1883 with a presbytery added in 1896. The church was described as a 'mission', established under St Mary's of Derby. A church hall was built alongside in the 1990s.

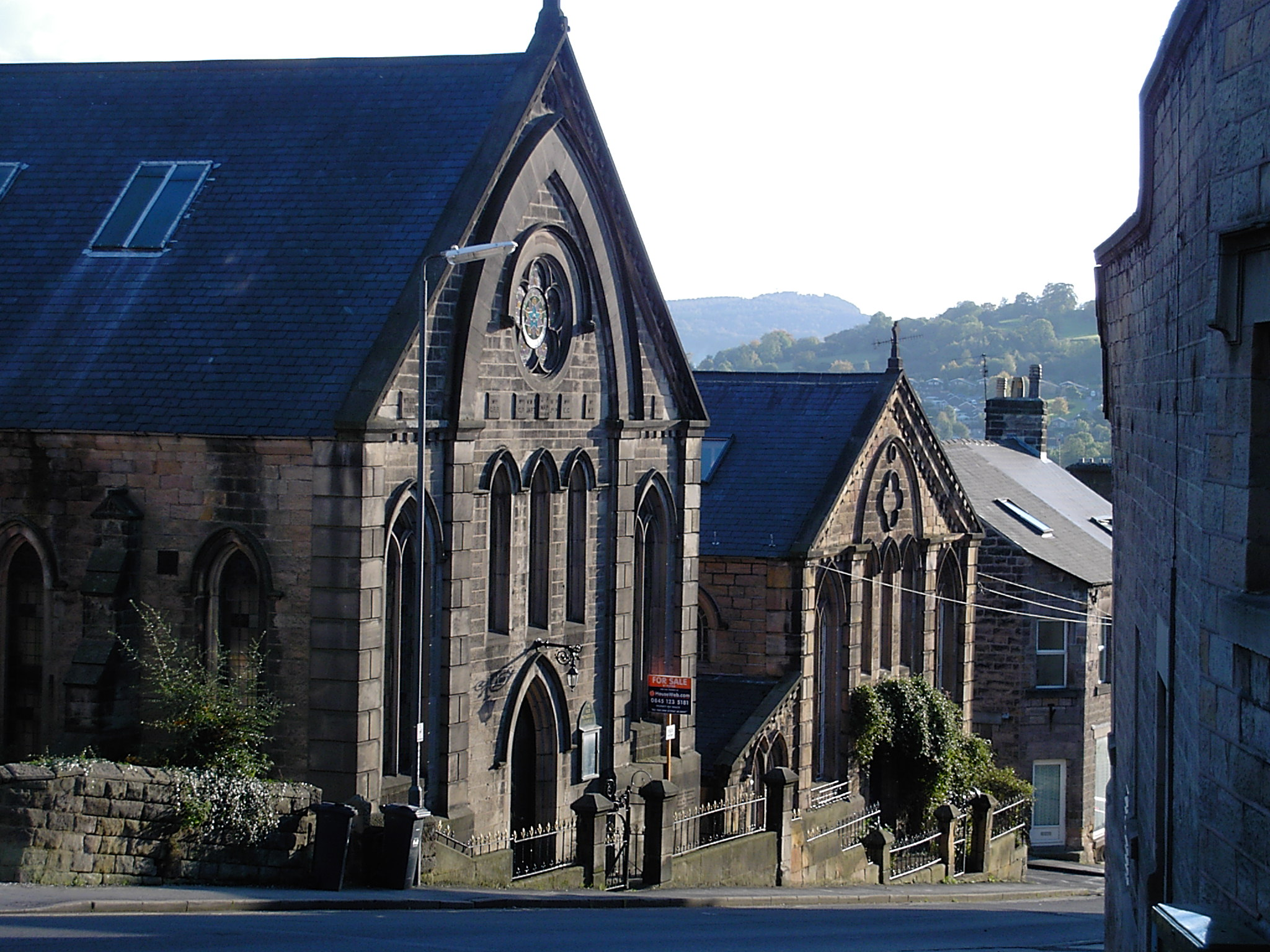
Old Methodist Church above Old Sunday School

- Youth Hostel – a YHA youth hostel – Built in 1882 as Smedley Memorial Hospital. There is a later (Hunter) wing with a datestone of 1897 set further back from the road. The Youth Hostel opened in 1983 and closed on 30 September 2007.
- Matlock Methodist & United Reformed Church – originally Matlock Wesleyan Chapel, and later the Trinity Methodist Church. The church was designed by C.O. Ellison of Liverpool, with additions designed by Horace G. Bradley. The neo-gothic church was originally built in 1882 without the slender steeple, which is now a landmark feature reaching above the roofs of neighbouring buildings, and, from higher levels, an elegant feature against the backdrop of the hills beyond. The Manse was built at the west of the site, fronting New Street.
- Old Sunday School which is now private homes.
- Old Methodist Church – the Primitive Methodist congregation was founded in 1838, although the current church on Bank Road, opposite the entrance to County Hall, was rebuilt in 1856 and the adjacent School Room below was added in 1878. Until recently, the Old Methodist Church housed the Matlock Wurlitzer.

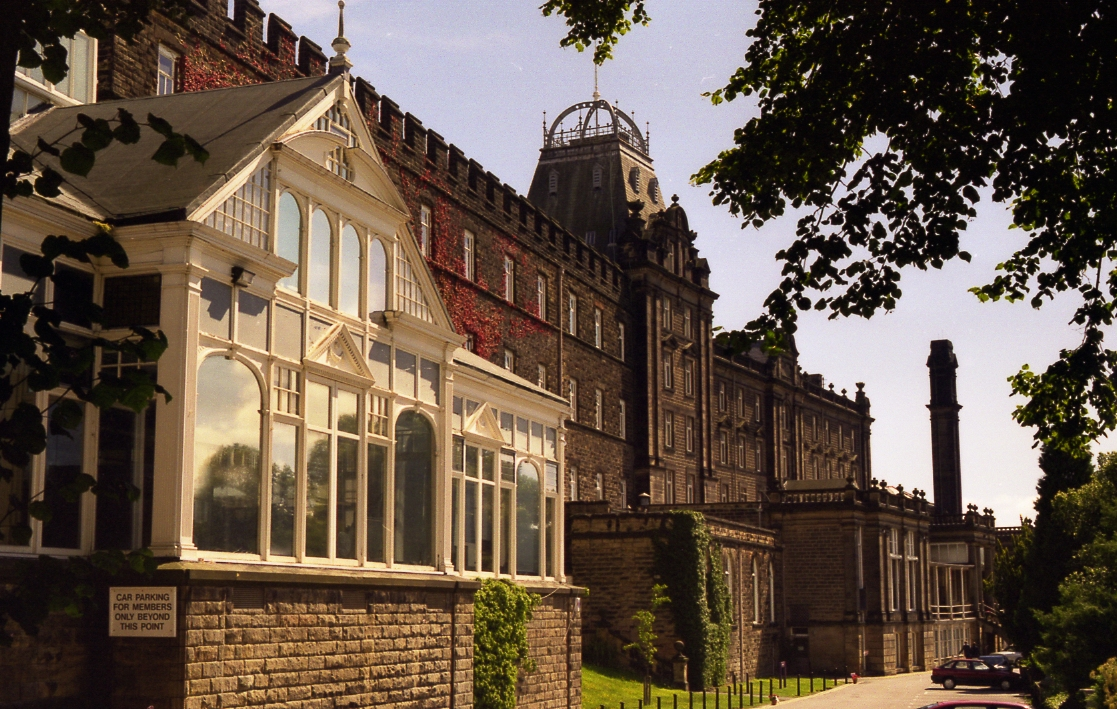
County Hall with Winter Gardens in foreground

- County Hall – formerly Smedley's Hydro, is a grade II listed building which dominates Matlock Bank. The earliest (western) section seen today was built in c. 1867 by Smedley. Much of today's building was added after Smedley's death in 1874. The first phase, in 1881, included the entrance hall and staircase, now in the middle section. In 1886, the eastern section was added by architect George Statham of Nottingham. Later extensions include the tall chimney, impressive for its height on the already prominent site, along with boiler house and bath in 1894. The domed glass Winter Gardens, which housed a ballroom, and the northern block on the other side of Smedley Street were added in 1901. The northern block was linked by the unusual two-storey bridge over Smedley Street.
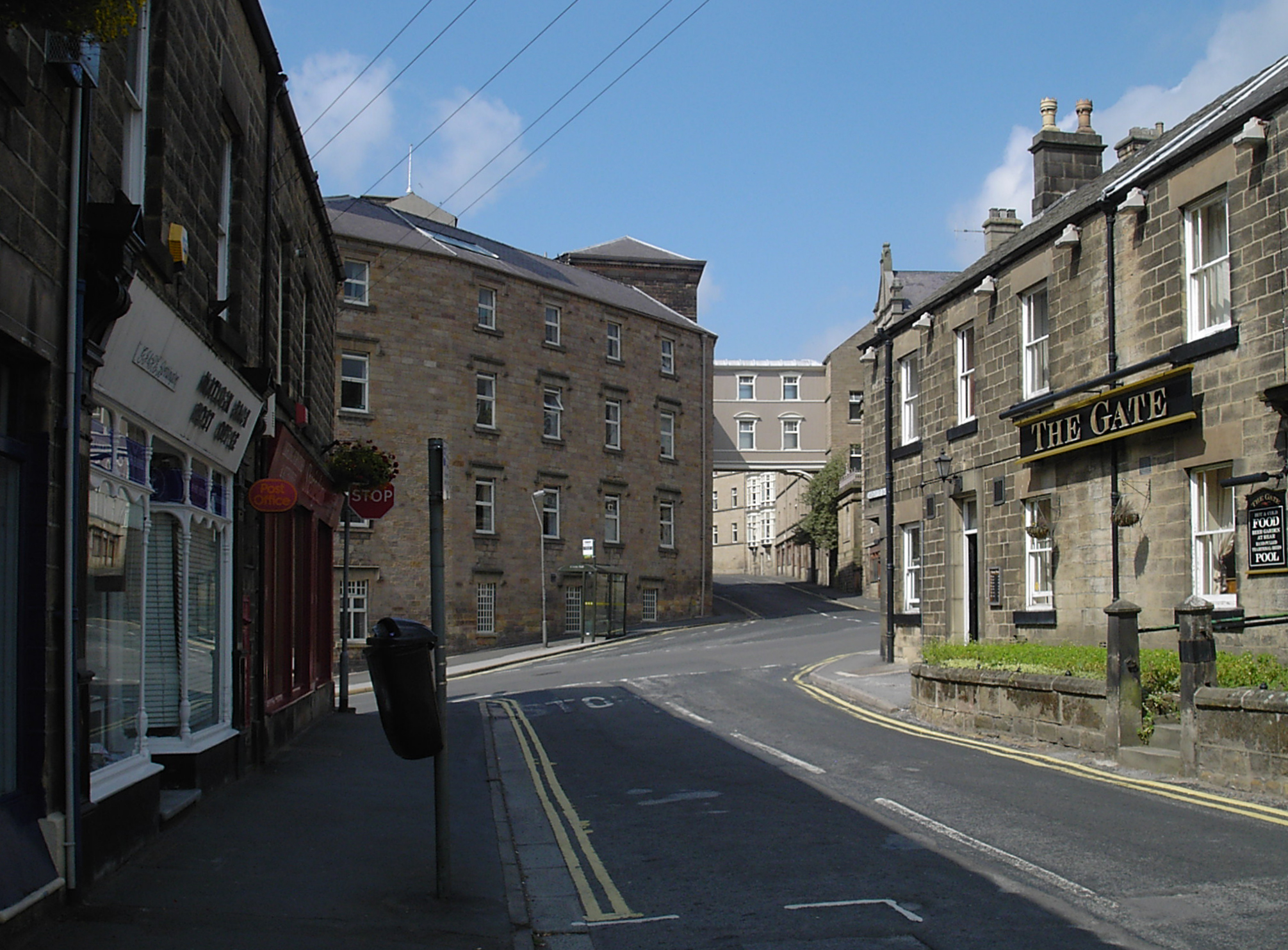
  The Gate and, across Bank Road, County Hall
- Smedley Street traverses Bank Road. It has its own parade of shops and a post office (now closed). The east end of Smedley Street (known as Smedley Street East) is home to Laser Rail, a designer and manufacturer of rail measurement equipment now incorporated into Balfour Beatty's rail division. At the west end is All Saints' Church, Matlock Bank.

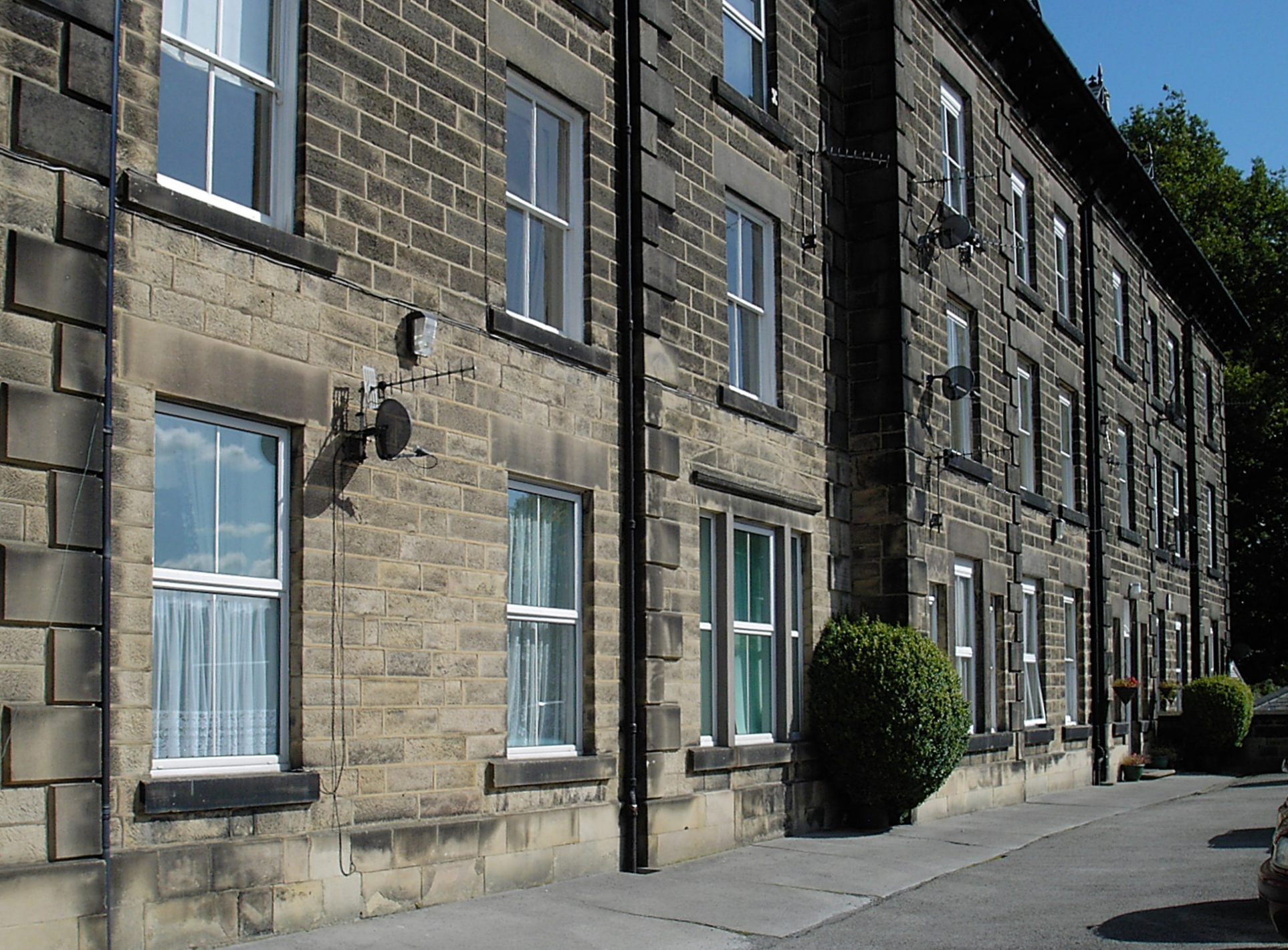
Rutland Court

- The Gate public house – There were known to have been numerous public houses on Matlock Bank, thought to have been the result of the ban on alcohol consumption within the hydros themselves, especially at Smedley's. The whereabouts of many is no longer known. The Gate (dated 1869) was one of these, and still stands on the corner of Smedley Street and Bank Road, opposite Smedley's. It now functions as an arts venue known as Designate at the Gate.

NB. Beyond Smedley Street, Bank Road is actually Rutland Street.

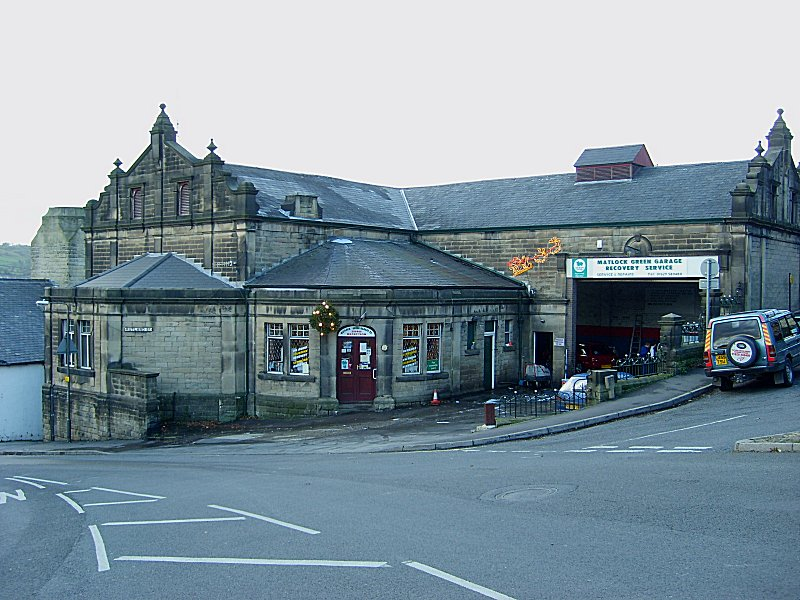
Old tram depot, Bank Road (technically Rutland Street)

- Rutland Court – the former Matlock House Hydro stands prominently on the east side of Rutland Street. The hydro was built in 1863 and an engraving of 1870 shows that the main block, at least that which is visible from the roadside today, is largely unaltered.
- Elmtree House – a former hydro, now 70–74 Rutland Street, was opened in 1862. It is just north of the dominant Matlock House (now Rutland Court).
- The Old Tram Depot which is now a garage and car repair centre. The garage maintains the name Matlock Green Garage, although it has not been situated at Matlock Green for many years.
- Rockside Hydro – an imposing building with views across Matlock, is a grade II listed building, on higher ground above Smedley's and is distinctive for its two octagonal corner turrets with conical roofs topped by lanterns. Rockside was built circa 1860, but extended significantly by the firm of architects Parker and Unwin between 1901 and 1905, The building was also extended later in 1923 and 1928. An upper floor glazed conservatory with a glazed curved roof was added in c. 1923, and a block was added on Cavendish Road in 1928. It probably is not so well known that during the Second World War, Rockside Hall was used as an RAF psychiatric hospital, where mentally-scarred service personnel (mostly aircrew) were rehabilitated. It was somewhat unkindly known as "Hatters Castle" by locals.

== Dale Road ==
Dale Road runs all the way from Matlock Bridge (road bridge over the River Derwent) to North Parade in Matlock Bath. It forms part of the Derby to Manchester road (A6) and has very many bends. Dale Road, like Bank Road (see previous section), contains a large number of examples of Victorian architecture, although only four are listed by English Heritage. However, all buildings on Dale Road are included in two conservation areas created by Derbyshire Dales District Council. These conservation areas are called "Matlock Bridge" (from the bridge over the Derwent to the railway bridge over Dale Road), then "Matlock Dale" to the outskirts of Matlock Bath. In this section, the main features of Dale Road are described, starting at Matlock Bridge and then proceeding in a southerly direction until the High Tor Hotel.

- Railway Station and Station House – The railway station and the nearby station house were both designed by Joseph Paxton around 1850, as part of the building of the Midland Railway's Derby to Buxton route. The station house, being largely unaltered since being built, is listed Grade II by English Heritage, but the station itself is unlisted.
- Matlock Bridge – This is the road crossing of the River Derwent. The first stone bridge was constructed over or close to the site of a ford in the mid 13th century. It was only a single carriageway in width and remained so for 550 years. In the 1890s there were discussions regarding the need for a wider bridge to be able to cope with the increasing road traffic. A new bridge was proposed which would have involved the demolition of the existing. However, a decision was taken to double the width of the existing bridge. This work was undertaken in 1903–1904. The bridge was made one-way to vehicular traffic at time of building of the access road to the superstore in Cawdor Quarry in 2007. The bridge is listed as Grade II* by English Heritage.
- RBS Bank (now closed) – There is a pedestrian access to this bank from Dale Road, although its postal address is Snitterton Road. This a building that has seen several changes of occupancy. In recent times, it has been offices for the Derbyshire Stone Company, then bank premises for William Deacons, then Williams & Glyn, then Royal Bank of Scotland (RBS). This stone building was originally built in the late 18th century and is listed as Grade II by English Heritage.
- Queens Head Inn – The building currently on the corner of the junction of Holt Lane with Dale Road dates from the late 19th century. At that time it was the Queens Head Inn, although it has now been converted to shops. Along with the Market Hall (see below), this was one of the earliest buildings to be constructed at this (north) end of Dale Road.
- HSBC Bank (now closed) – This building is on the east side of Dale Road (No 5) and has an eye-catching clock. There is a record that Henry Barnwell and his son Harry moved from Birmingham and established a watchmaker and jewellery business there in 1876. Their corner shop became "London City and Midland Bank" which later became just "Midland Bank" which then became HSBC. The HSBC bank closed in June 2015.
- NatWest Bank (now closed) – This building of 1901 is on the east side of Dale Road (No 19). This is one of the few buildings on Dale Road that has a brick frontage (although several that have a stone frontage do use brick for the sides and rear).
- Market Hall – This building is on the west side of Dale Road (Nos 4,6,8,10) just south of the Queens Head Inn. The Market Hall was constructed in 1867–68. The ground floor was used as a general market house with 12 shop units while the upper floor was used for assemblies, public meetings and entertainments. The architectural style chosen for this was that of the then-popular Gothic Revival. The building was also an important source of civic pride, designed to impress and sporting a row of carved heraldic shields across its façade. The Market Hall is now a row of shops and offices.
- Olde Englishe Hotel – This large building is on the east side of Dale Road (No 77). Its "old English" timber frames, spire-like turret and corner position give it a striking appearance in a street-scene of predominantly darker-stone buildings. The building closed as a hotel in 2009, and has been converted into bars and shops.
- Lime – This building is on the east side of Dale Road (No 79) and complements the Olde Englishe Hotel which it faces across the road junction. It has a distinctive cupola above its entrance. The building has had a variety of uses, from grocery shop, to antiques sales to hair salon.
- Evans Jeweller – Evans Jewellers Shop at Nos 93–95 Dale Road, with its projecting clock, can be regarded as the focal point of that part of the east side of Dale Road between its junctions with Olde Englishe Road and Holt Lane. W. Evans & Son has traded from these premises continuously since it was first established in 1893.
- Holt Terrace – This is a five-house terrace that looks down on the southern junction of Holt Lane with Dale Road. It lies just north of the railway crossing of Dale Road and the River Derwent. Holt Lane was the "main road" along the valley until the Midland Railway opened in 1849. Soon after then, the Dale Road area was developed and Dale Road relegated Holt Lane to a side street.
- John Hadfield House – This is a post-WWII building on the west side of Dale Road immediately south of the railway bridge. It was built in the former Harveydale limestone quarry as the headquarters of Derbyshire Stone Ltd and named after a leading figure in the company. Derbyshire Stone was ultimately absorbed into Tarmac Ltd in 1968, whose Matlock office was subsequently closed. John Hadfield House is now occupied by offices of the Derbyshire County Council.
- The Boat House – This pub (now closed) is next to John Hadfield House on the west side of Dale Road. The pub was built in the early 19th century and is listed Grade II by English Heritage. It takes its name from a small ferry which once linked Matlock Dale to Matlock Green. The ferry was replaced by a footbridge in 1872.
- Footbridge to Pic Tor – This footbridge on the east side of Dale Road replaced a ferry at this point in 1872. The present iron bridge, erected in 1922, was refurbished in 2005. The bridge provides access from this part of Dale Road to Starkholmes Road, Pic Tor, High Tor, Hall Leys Park and Matlock Green.
- Artists Corner – This is a collection of houses in the valley bottom built along the west side of a sharp bend on Dale Road. It has been a favoured spot through the centuries for artists to come to admire the scenery and either draw or paint High Tor, which overlooks it from the south. It is overlooked on the north side by St Johns Road with its Grade II* listed Baptist Chapel. Artists Corner was also the location of a toll house on the Wirksworth-Moor-to-Longstone Turnpike (opened 1759).
- High Tor Hotel – This building, squeezed into the valley bottom below High Tor, was built in the early 19th century by Colonel Edward Payne. It was originally known as Tor Cottage and has had a variety of uses since then, including being a private home, lodging house, guest house, hotel and school (Matlock Modern School). As at August 2015, it is called High Tor Hotel and Artists Corner Restaurant and claims to be "a modern boutique hotel".
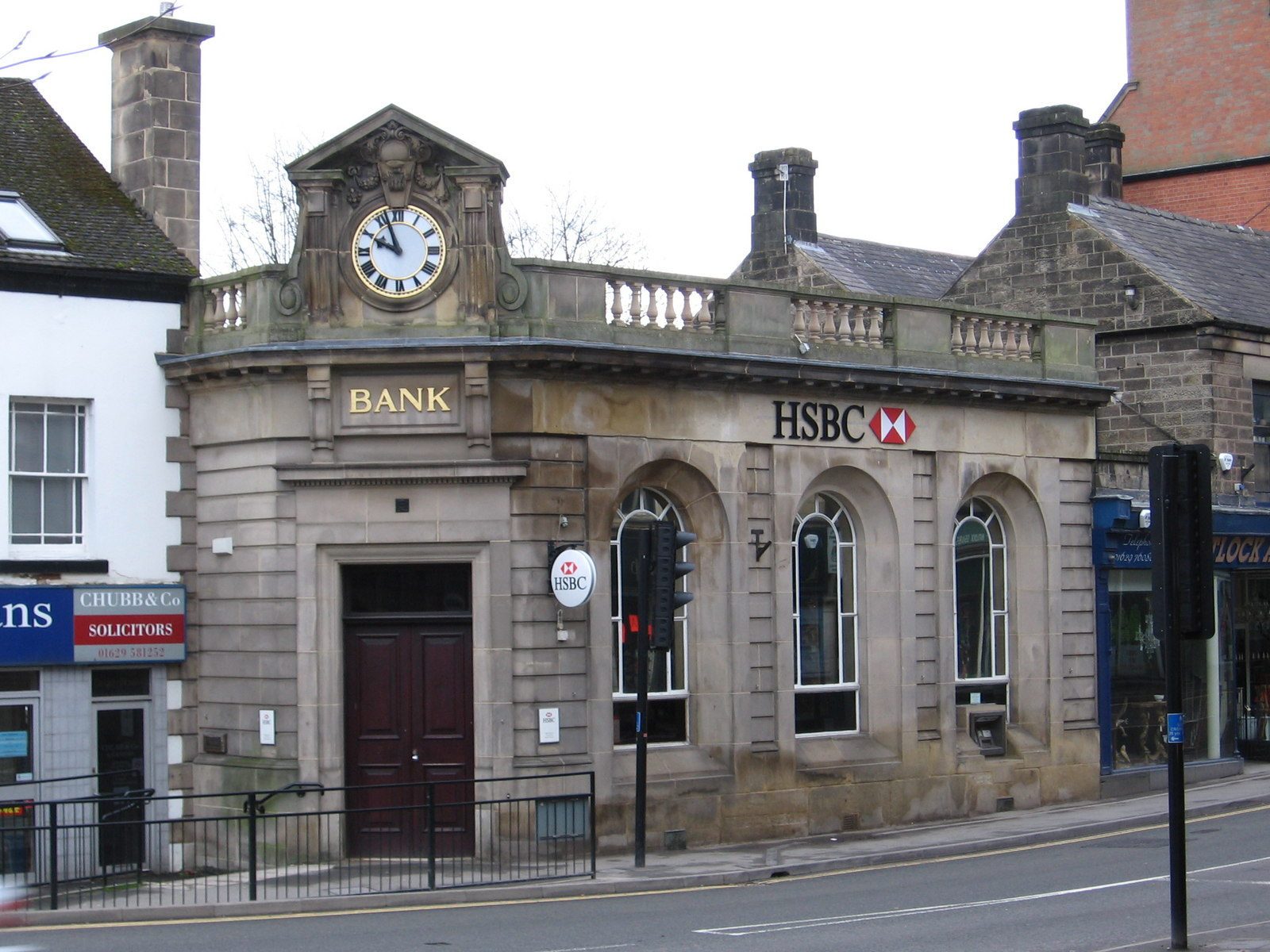
HSBC Bank

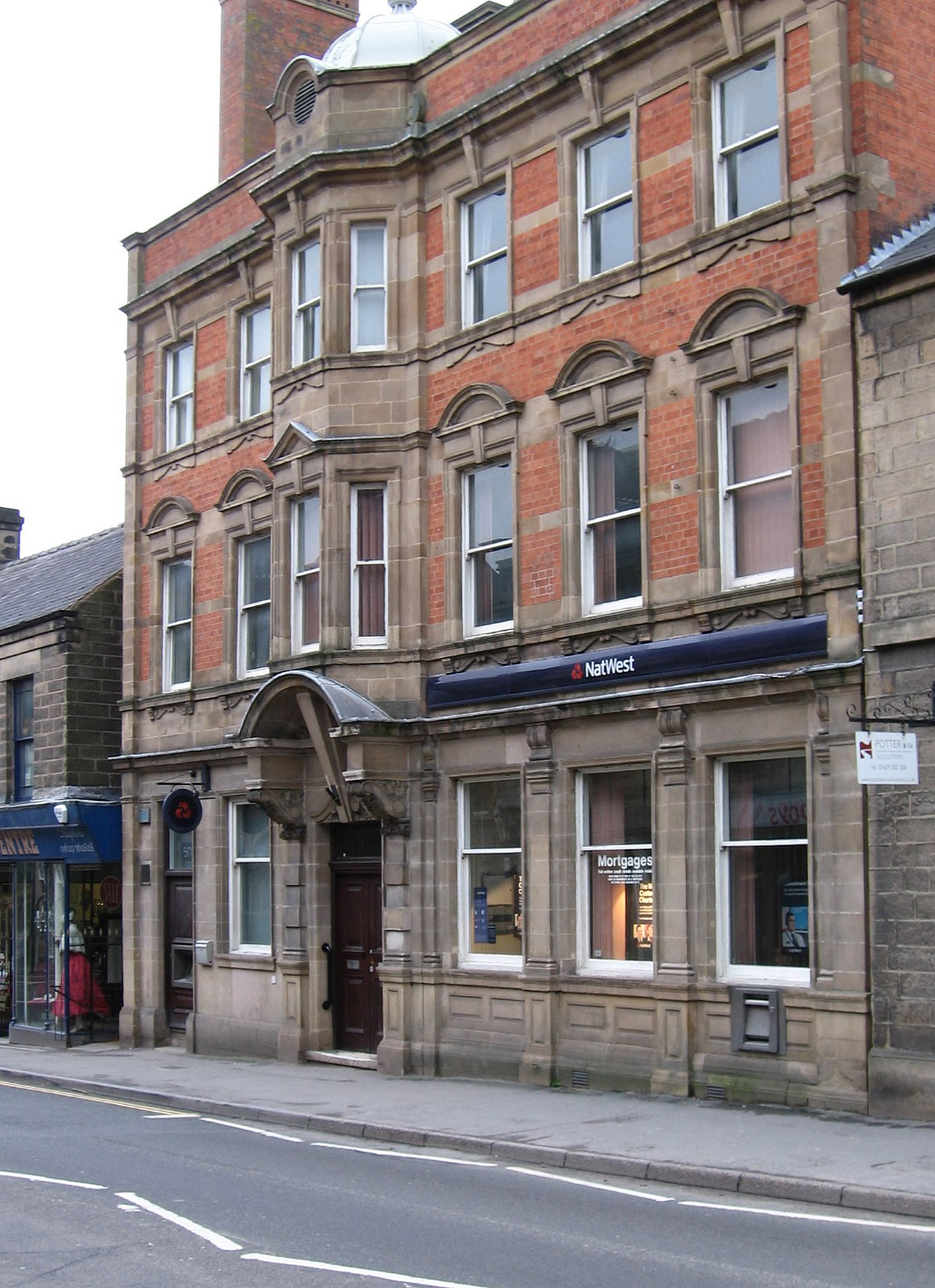
NatWest Bank

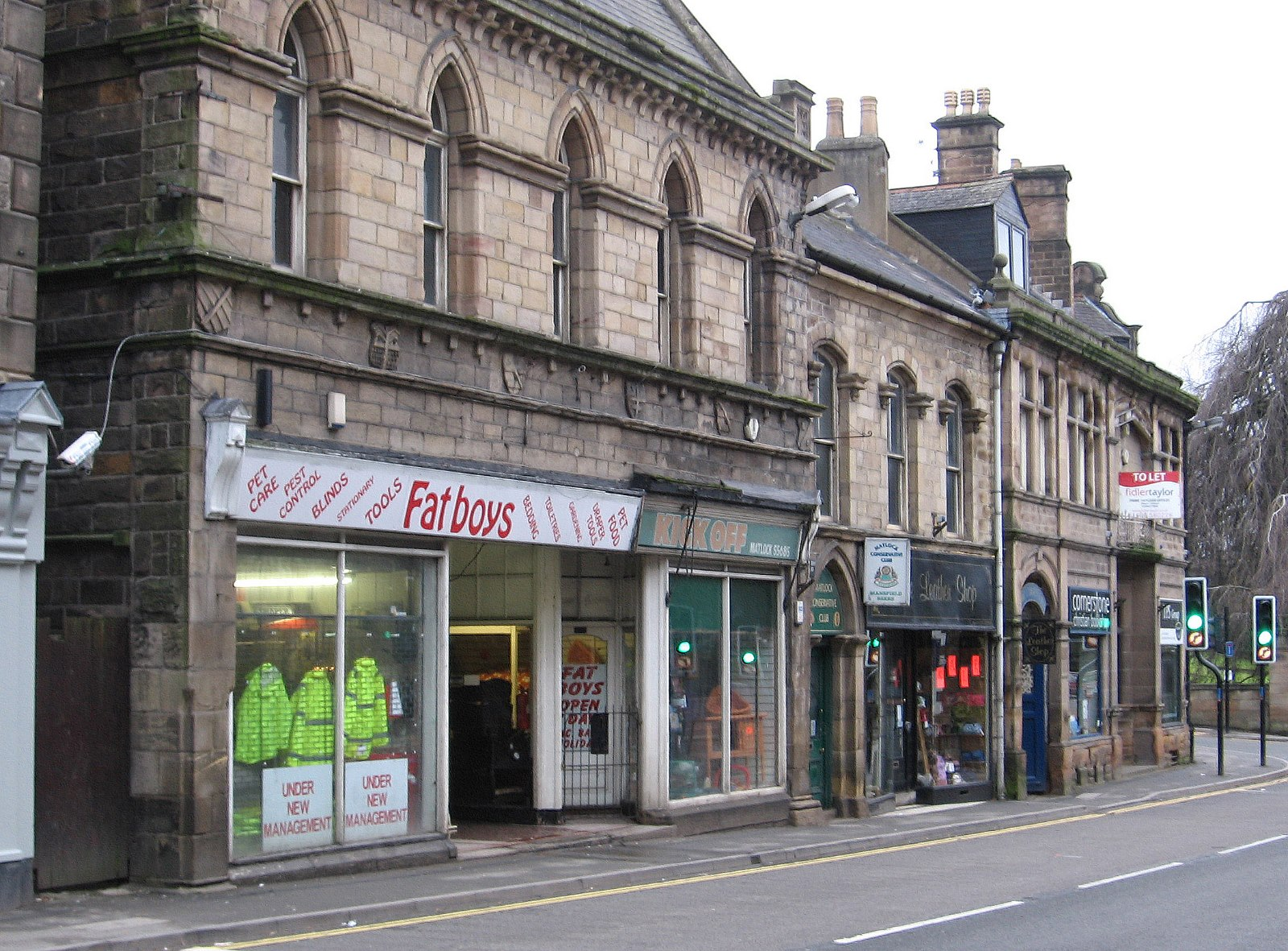
Market Hall with Queens Head beyond

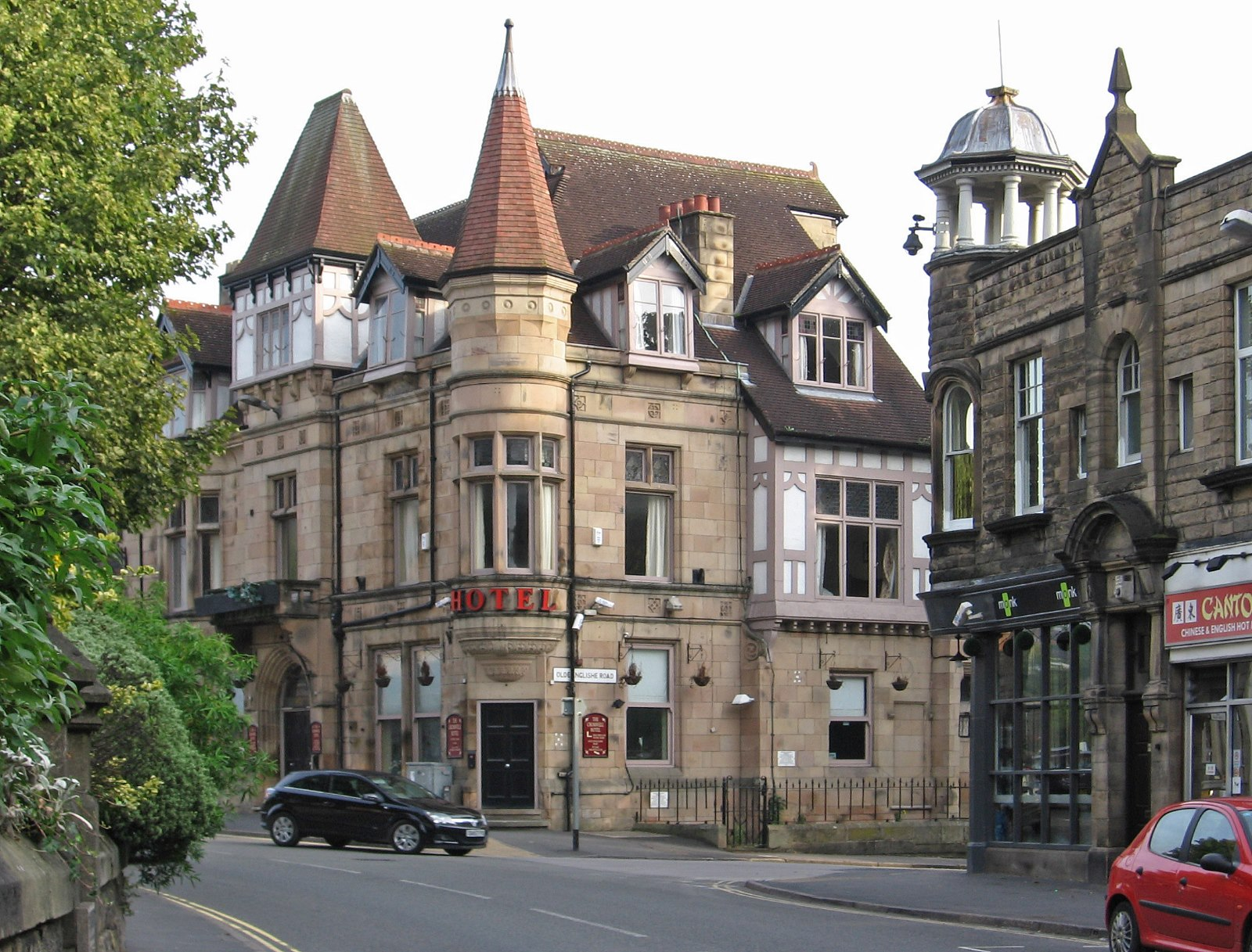
Olde Englishe Hotel

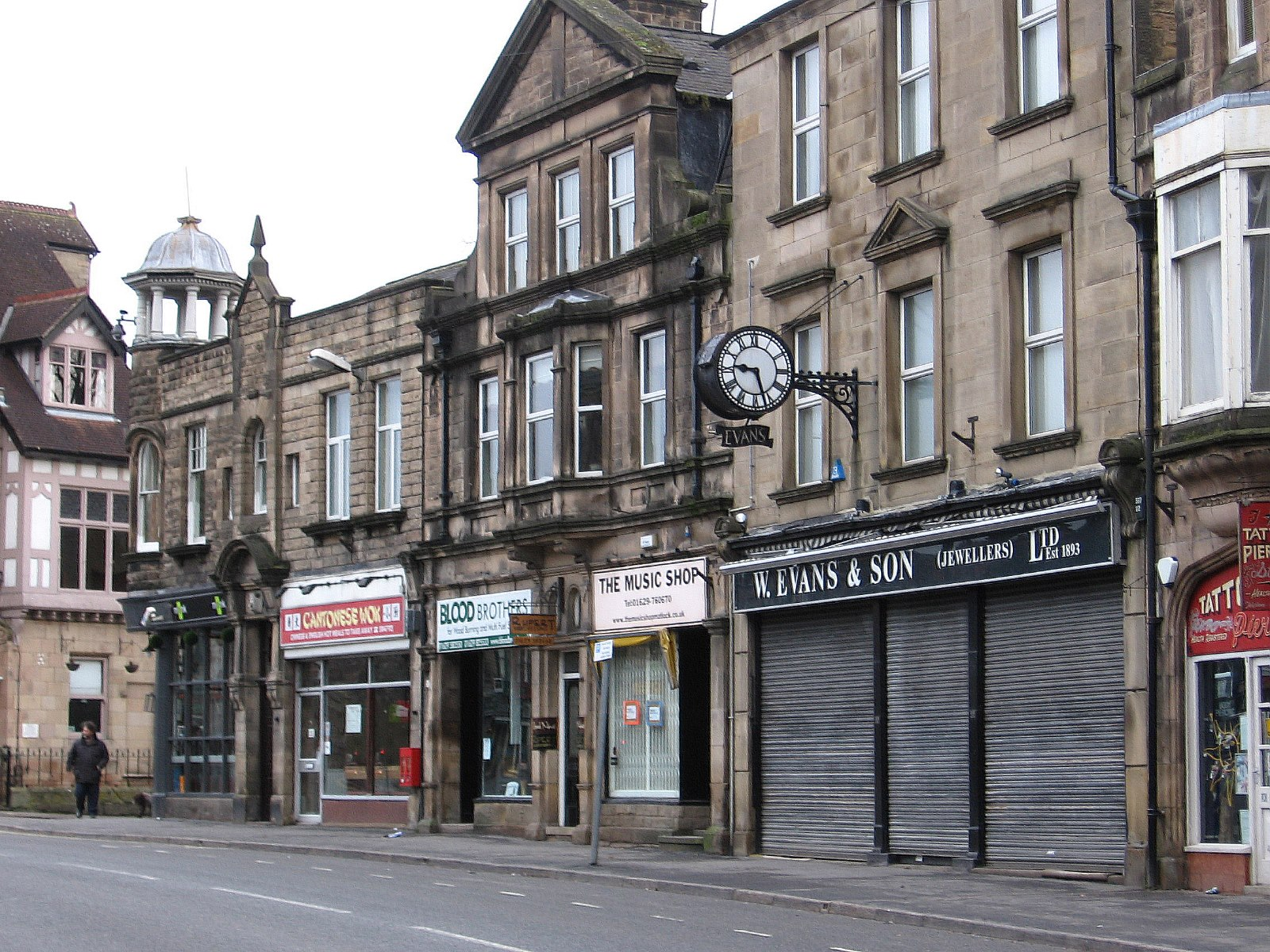
Evans Jeweller, with Lime and Olde Englishe Hotel beyond

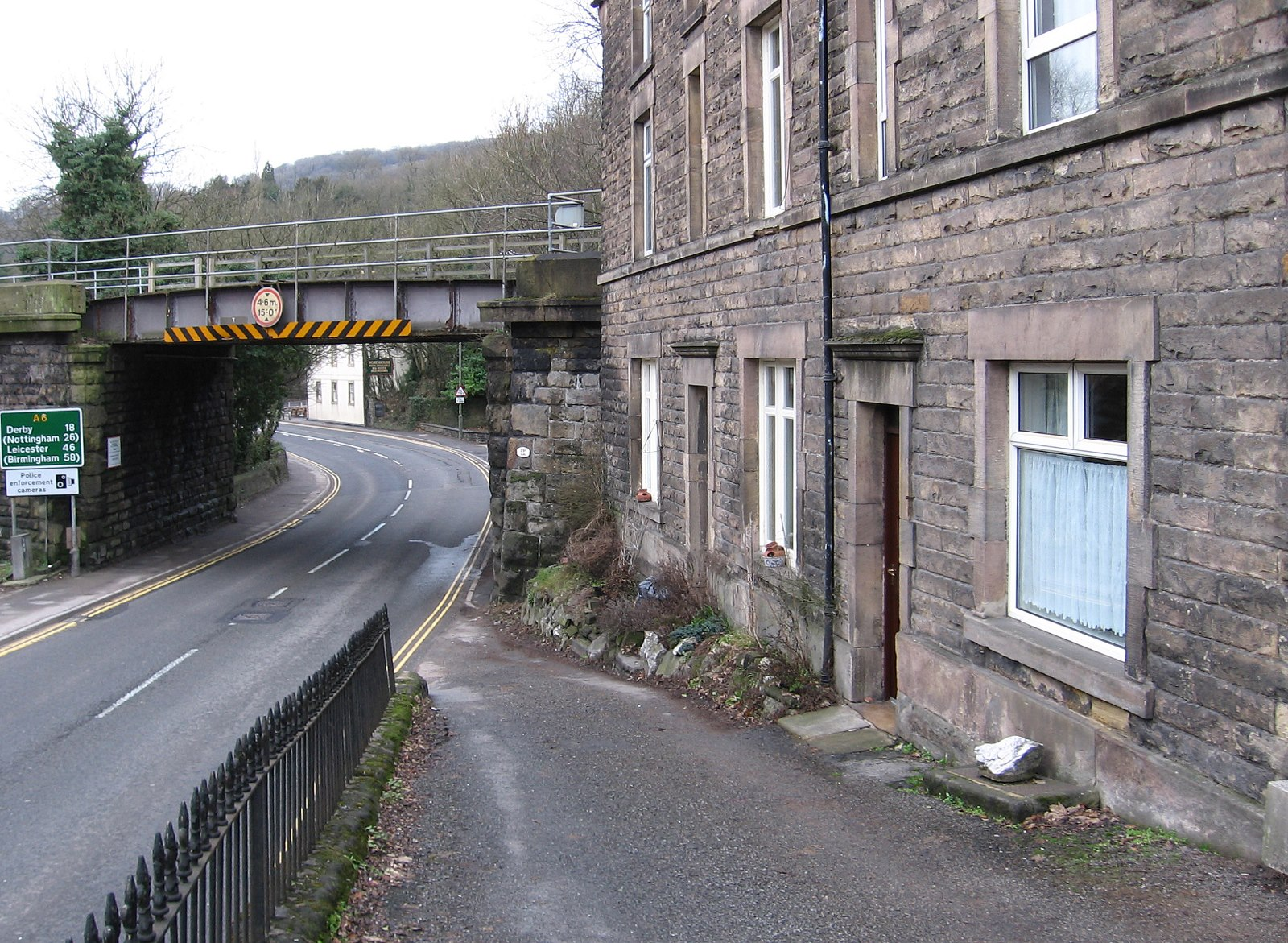
Holt Terrace with railway bridge to left

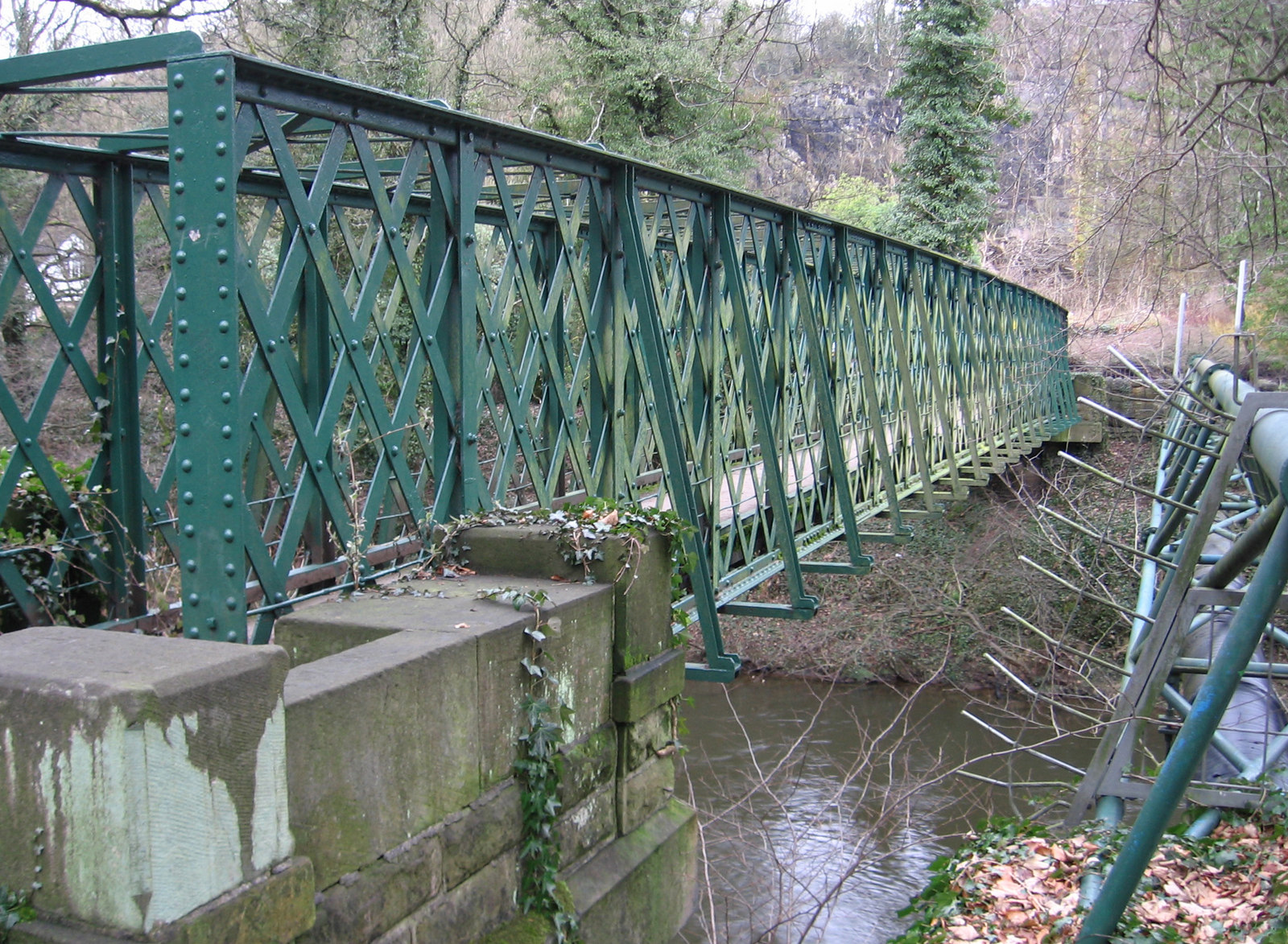
Footbridge to Pic Tor

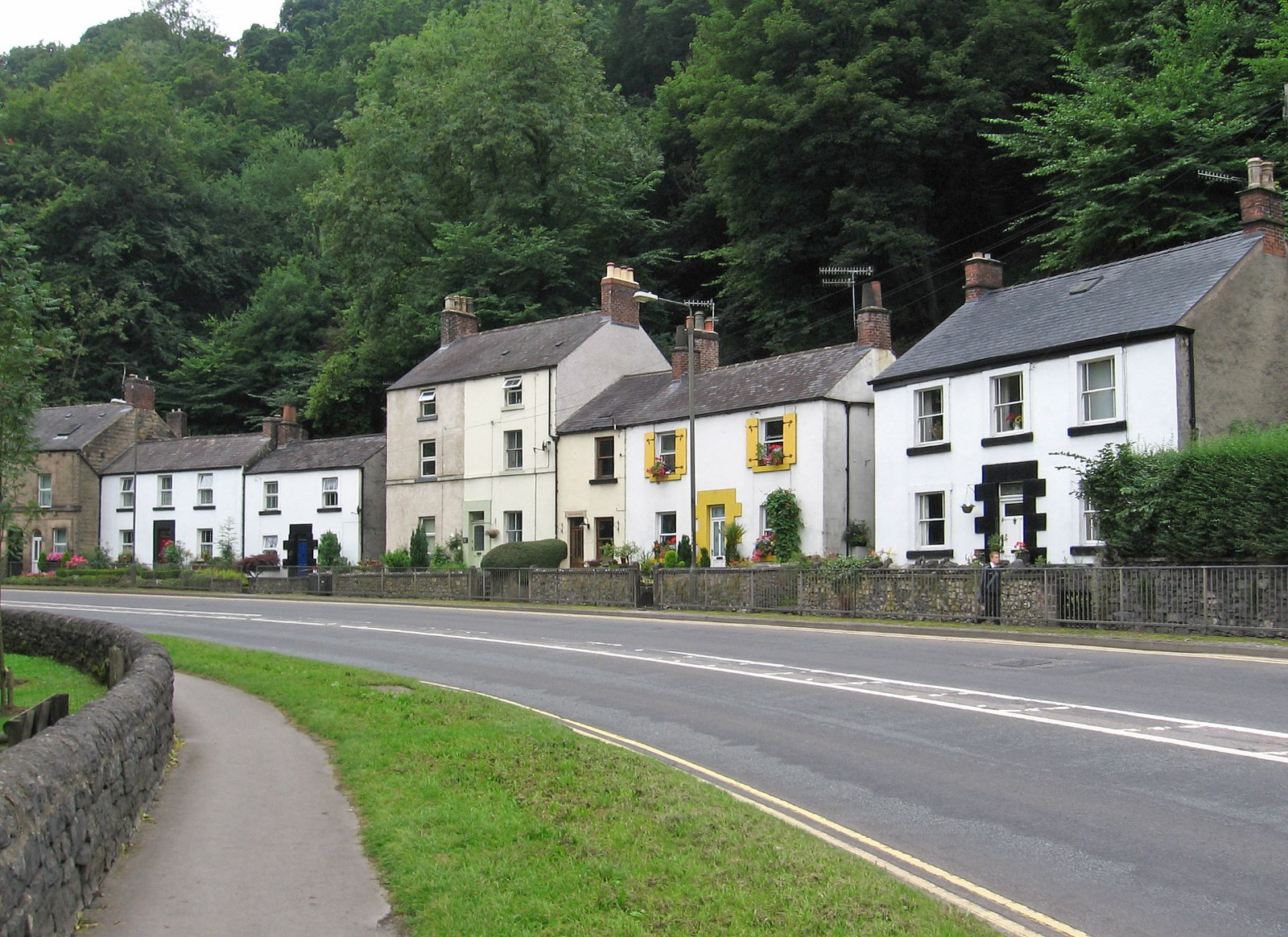
Artists Corner

== Sport ==
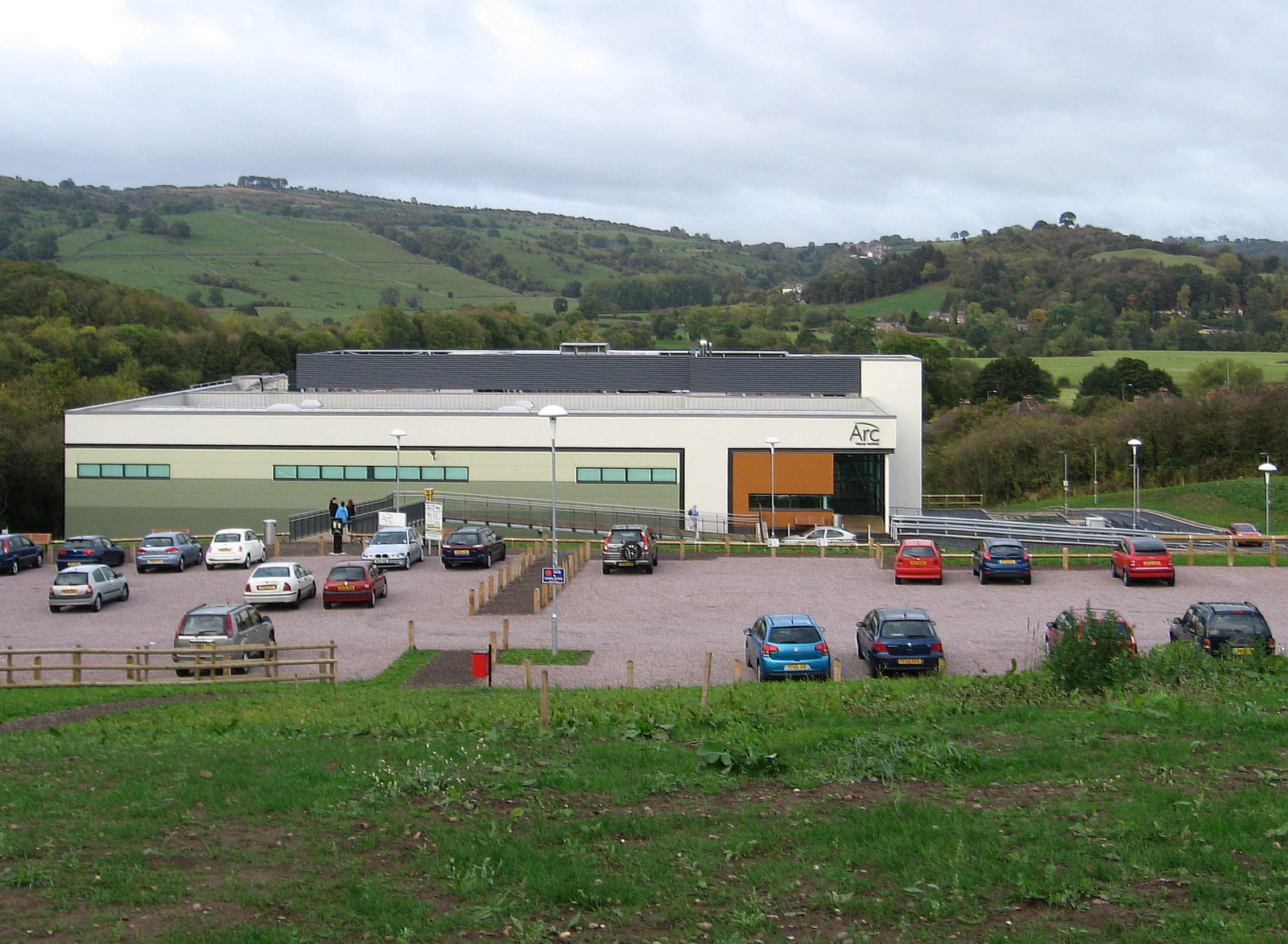
ARC Leisure Centre

Matlock is home to Matlock Town Football Club, playing in the Northern Premier League East Division at their Causeway Lane ground.

Matlock is also home to Matlock and Cromford Meadows Cricket Club playing next to the football ground, and Matlock and District Swimming Club (also known as MAD Swimming) which trained and competed in the nearby old Matlock Lido before it closed in August 2011 with subsequent events transferred to the Arc complex. Matlock Cycling Club has helped to produce a number of national and international status riders including Tim Gould, Olympian Mountain Biker Annie Last and has a popular youth section.

Matlock's rugby team play their home matches at nearby Cromford Meadows. They run 3 senior teams and the 1st XV compete at Level 6 in the RFU league structure. Matlock Rugby Club also has a thriving minis and junior section with over 250 members all supported by fully qualified mini and junior coaches. In 2007 the club was awarded the Derbyshire Tigger Price Memorial trophy for the team of the year award.

On the outskirts of Matlock off the A6 Bakewell Road, a new multi-use leisure centre and swimming facility was opened in 2011 known as Arc Leisure Matlock. It was opened officially by Lord Sebastian Coe.

== Education and arts ==
The annual arts festival Matlock Live began takes place in June or July each year featuring local musicians, dancers, artists, etc. As part of the summer event, Matlock Live invites buskers and other street performers to form a busking trail around Matlock raising money for the charity Aquabox. Matlock Music present a series of public concerts at Highfields School (Upper Lumsdale site). Storytelling is also well represented with a monthly venue at the Imperial Rooms.

=== Education history ===
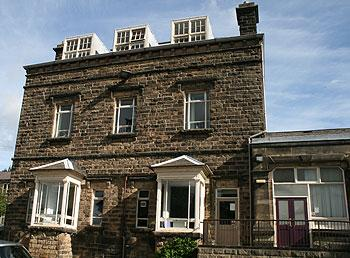
Ernest Bailey School (now County Council Records Office)

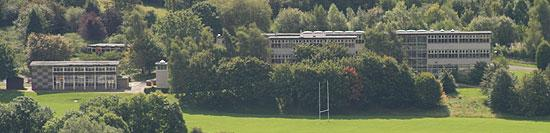
Highfields School 'Lower Site' at Starkholmes, formerly Charles White Secondary Modern

The first school in Matlock was founded in 1647 as a free school for local boys, originally funded by local George Spateman of Tansley and from 1668 by Anthony Wolley. This school was rebuilt in 1829 and expanded in 1860 and 1889 and girls first attended in 1816. This school has since been demolished (the date is unknown).

Another school, All Saints Primary School, was founded in 1875 to provide for the population of the newly developed Matlock Bank. This school still operates and is the biggest primary school in Matlock. In 1897, a third school, the Council School, was constructed on Matlock Bank, at the junction of Smedley Street and Chesterfield Road. It also still operates as Castle View Primary School.

Before Highfields School was founded in 1982, when the tripartite education system in Matlock ended, there were two secondary schools in Matlock; Charles White Secondary Modern School (founded in 1956, and named after two local MPs, father and son, the latter of who died in 1956) and Ernest Bailey's Grammar School (founded in 1924 and named after its wealthy founder).

As a Grammar school, Bailey's accepted students whose parents paid or who gained scholarships (by passing the Eleven plus exam) until fees were phased out, leaving scholarship as the only means of entry. Those who didn't attain a scholarship attended Charles White – it is estimated that Charles White students outnumbered Bailey's students 3:1. White had been built especially by Derbyshire County Council to accommodate the children who couldn't attend Bailey's.

The two schools were merged to create Highfields, a comprehensive school. The site of Charles White in Starkholmes became the 'lower site' of Highfields for years 7–8, while Bailey's was converted to the county council records offices. A new site was built to house the new 'upper site' at Lumsdale for years 9–13.

== Town centre development ==
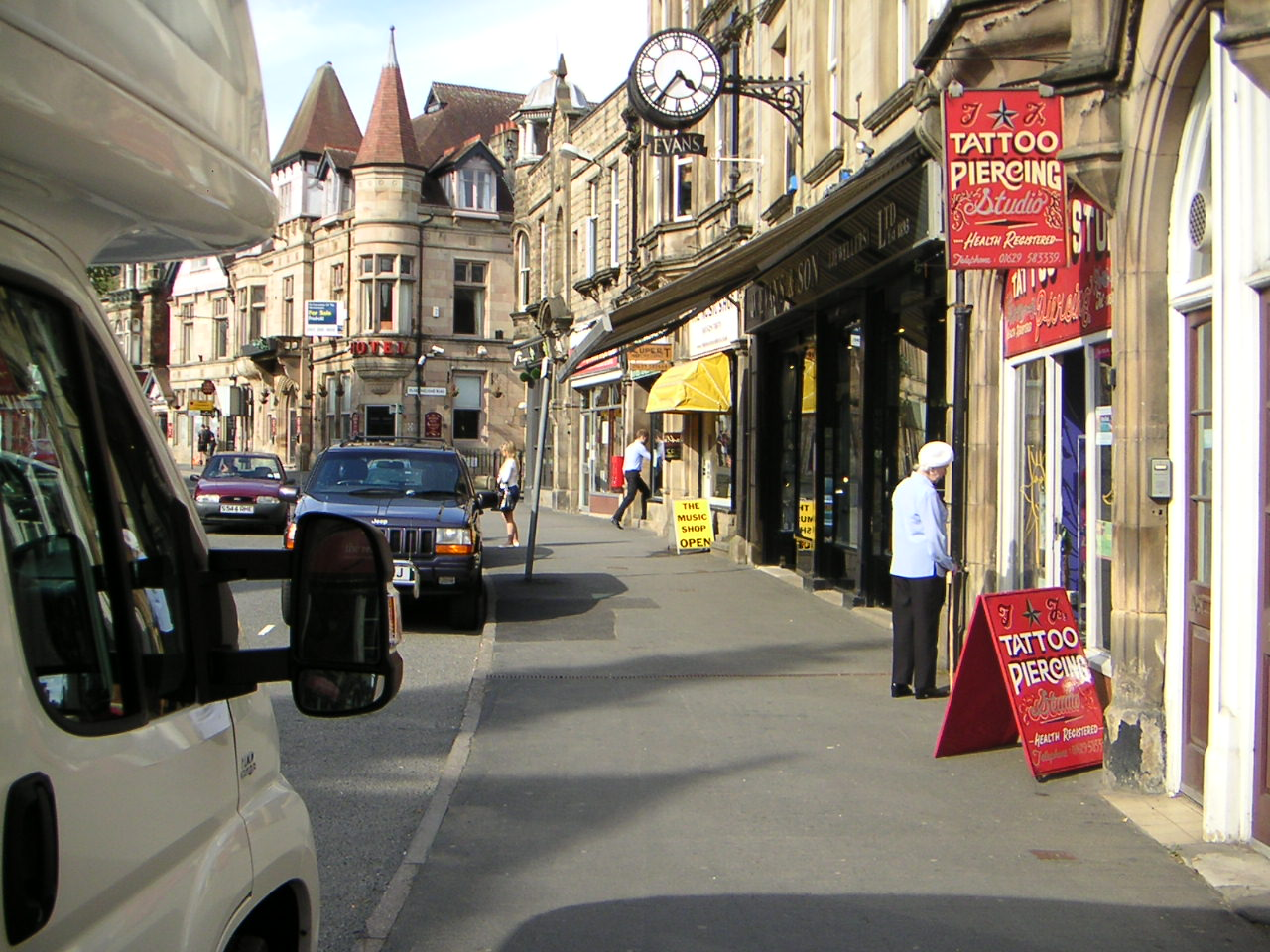
Dale Road (A6) exiting the edge of Matlock Town, showing traditional buildings housing independent shops and businesses

For over 10 years, the council had proposed to allow a Sainsbury's supermarket to be built in Cawdor Quarry, a disused quarry next to the railway station. In early 2007 building work started and it opened 4 October 2007. A new access road with its own bridge over the River Derwent allows the A6 to bypass the town centre. The old bridge is restricted to one-way traffic (out of town) and allows pedestrian access from the town centre to the train station, a newly built bus station and the supermarket. Several bus routes continue to serve only the old bus station on Bakewell Road, making Matlock one of the smallest towns in Britain to have two bus stations.

In 2010, Crown Square was updated with the replacement of pavements and street furniture intended to provide a look more appropriate to a conservation area; the old tarmac pavements and traffic island were rebuilt in local sandstone, barriers were replaced with heritage bollards and all street lights replaced. Bakewell Road and Firs Parade were not included in this phase as they are just off Crown Square, and along with Imperial Road they are yet to be redeveloped.

== Matlock on film and television ==
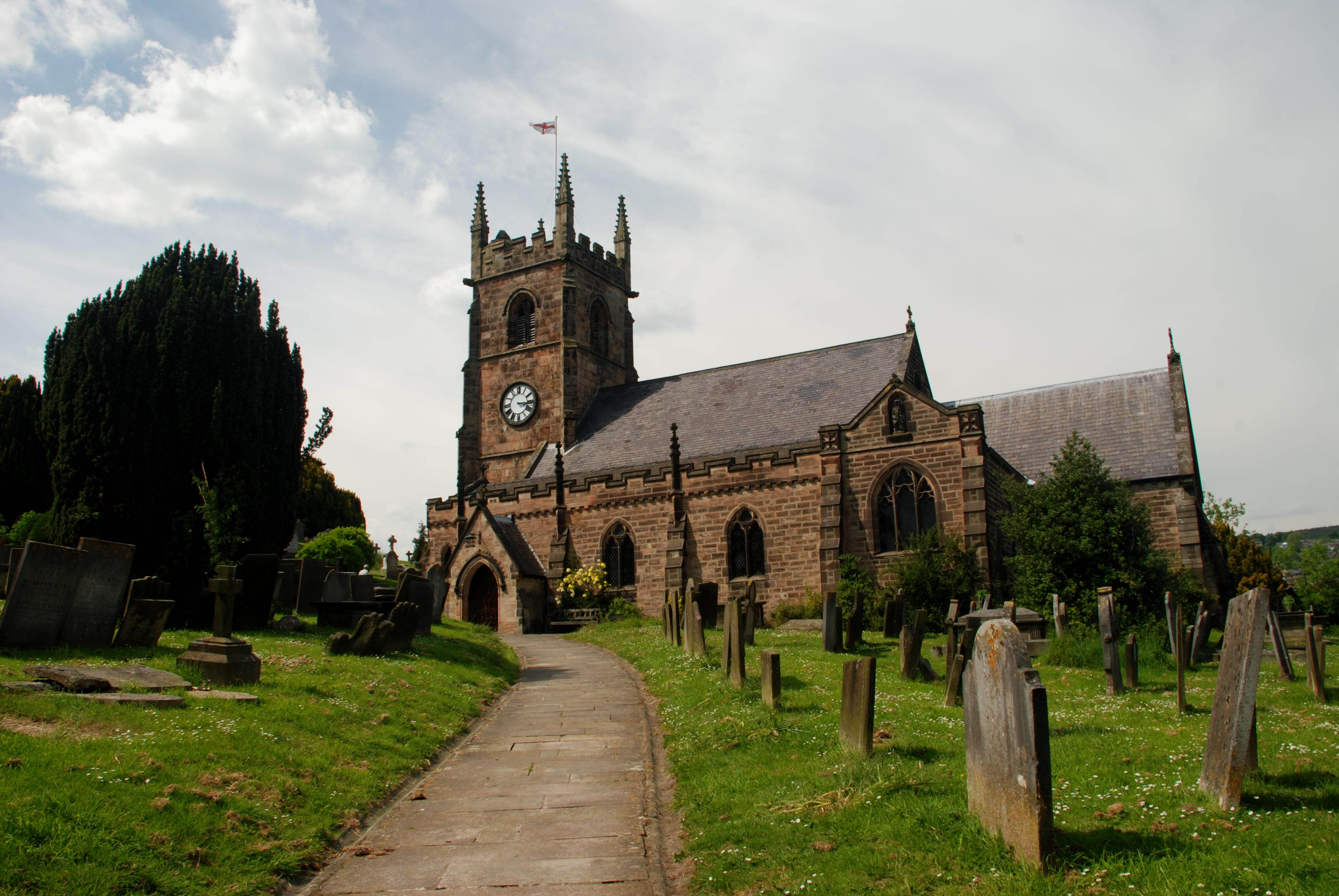
St Giles Church, featured in Women in Love

- Coming Down the Mountain, The BBC drama was set partly in Matlock although nothing was filmed there.
- Women in Love, Ken Russell's Oscar winning 1969 film, uses a house at the top of New Street (No. 80) as the home of the Brangwen sisters, Gudrun and Ursula. The house is currently a B&B. St Giles' Church in Church Street was the setting for the wedding of Laura Crich.
- A music video of Libera ("Salva Me", 1997) in a rock formation in Matlock Cave.
- Peak Practice, the ITV series, used locations in Matlock, including Highfields School, Victoria Hall Gardens and Henry Avenue, although the main village location is Crich and nearby Fritchley.
- Dead Man's Shoes, the 2004 film by Shane Meadows, was filmed in and around Matlock.
- In Denial of Murder, 2005 BBC dramatisation of Matlock Mercury editor Don Hale's campaign to free Stephen Downing.
- Skeletons, 2010 film, partially filmed around Matlock including locations at the Morledge estate.
- Starlings, a 2012 Sky 1 drama, is set in Matlock.
- The Neighbourhood, a 2026 ITV1 reality television series, was filmed at the Darwin Lake Holiday Village in Matlock.

== Local media ==
Local news and television channels are BBC East Midlands and ITV Central. Television signals can be received from one of the three local relay transmitters (Matlock, Stanton Moor and Bolehill).

Matlock's local radio stations are BBC Radio Derby on 95.3 FM, Capital Midlands on 102.8 FM and Greatest Hits Radio Yorkshire (formerly Peak FM) on 102.0 FM.

The Matlock Mercury is the town's weekly local newspaper.

== Matlock in literature ==
Karl Philipp Moritz in his Journeys of a German in England in 1782 describes Matlock as follows:

Travelling from Matlock Bath and via the Matlock Bridge you arrive in the small town of Matlock proper, a place hardly worth being called a village, as it is made up of very few, shoddy houses.

Mary Shelley in her 1818 novel Frankenstein:

We left Oxford with regret, and proceeded to Matlock, which was our next place of rest. The country in the neighbourhood of this village resembled, to a greater degree, the scenery of Switzerland; but every thing is on a lower scale, and the green hills want the crown of distant white Alps, which always attend on the piny mountains of my native country. We visited the wondrous cave, and the little cabinets of natural history, where the curiosities are disposed in the same manner as in the collections at Servox and Chamounix. The latter name made me tremble, when pronounced by Henry; and I hastened to quit Matlock, with which that terrible scene was thus associated.

Letitia Elizabeth Landon's poetical illustration Matlock, to an engraving of a painting by Thomas Allom, is subtitled "To the memory of a favourite child (the daughter of a friend) who died there". It was published in Fisher's Drawing Room Scrap Book, 1839.

William Berry's poem "Matlock" appeared in his collection A Victim to Glamour: And Other Poems. Leeds: T. Barmby, 1874.

Carola Dunn's mystery Gone West (2012) is set in Matlock.

== Youth hostels ==
The Youth Hostels Association (YHA) has its national headquarters in the former Severn Trent Water building on Dimple Road, Matlock.

== Notable residents ==
- Chris Bowler (1965-), scientist, noted in particular as director of the Tara Oceans project since 2021. Fellow of the Royal Society, member of the Accademia dei Lincei (Italy), and Académie des Sciences (France)
- John Bowne (1627–1695), a Quaker and an English settler residing in the Dutch colony of New Netherland.
- Joseph George Cumming (1812–1868), geologist and archaeologist, worked on the geology and history of the Isle of Man.
- Augustus Arkwright (1821–1887), from Willersley Castle, Royal Navy officer, politician and MP for North Derbyshire, 1868 to 1880.
- John Wolley (1823–1859), naturalist with a large collection of bird eggs and studies on the dodo and great auk.
- John E. Amoore (1930–1998), biochemist who proposed the stereochemical theory for olfaction.
- Phillip Whitehead (1937–2005), politician, MP for Derby North, 1970–1983 and later MEP
- Ann Leslie (1941–2023), a formidable journalist who went to school locally
- Alan Parker (born 1944), guitarist and composer
- Charles Webster (born c. 1965), DJ and record producer
- Ben Ottewell (born 1976), singer-songwriter of the indie-rock band Gomez, winners of the 1998 Mercury Prize
- Isy Suttie (born 1978), comedian and actress, brought up locally

=== Sport ===
- Bill Bradbury (1933–1999), footballer who played 257 games including 178 for Hull City
- Bert Loxley (1934–2008), footballer and manager who played 245 games for Notts County
- Brian Edmeades (born 1941), cricketer who played 255 First-class cricket matches with Essex
- Graham Brown (born 1944), football goalkeeper, played 329 games including 142 at Mansfield Town
- Gary Crewe (born 1946), former British international cyclist

== Gallery ==
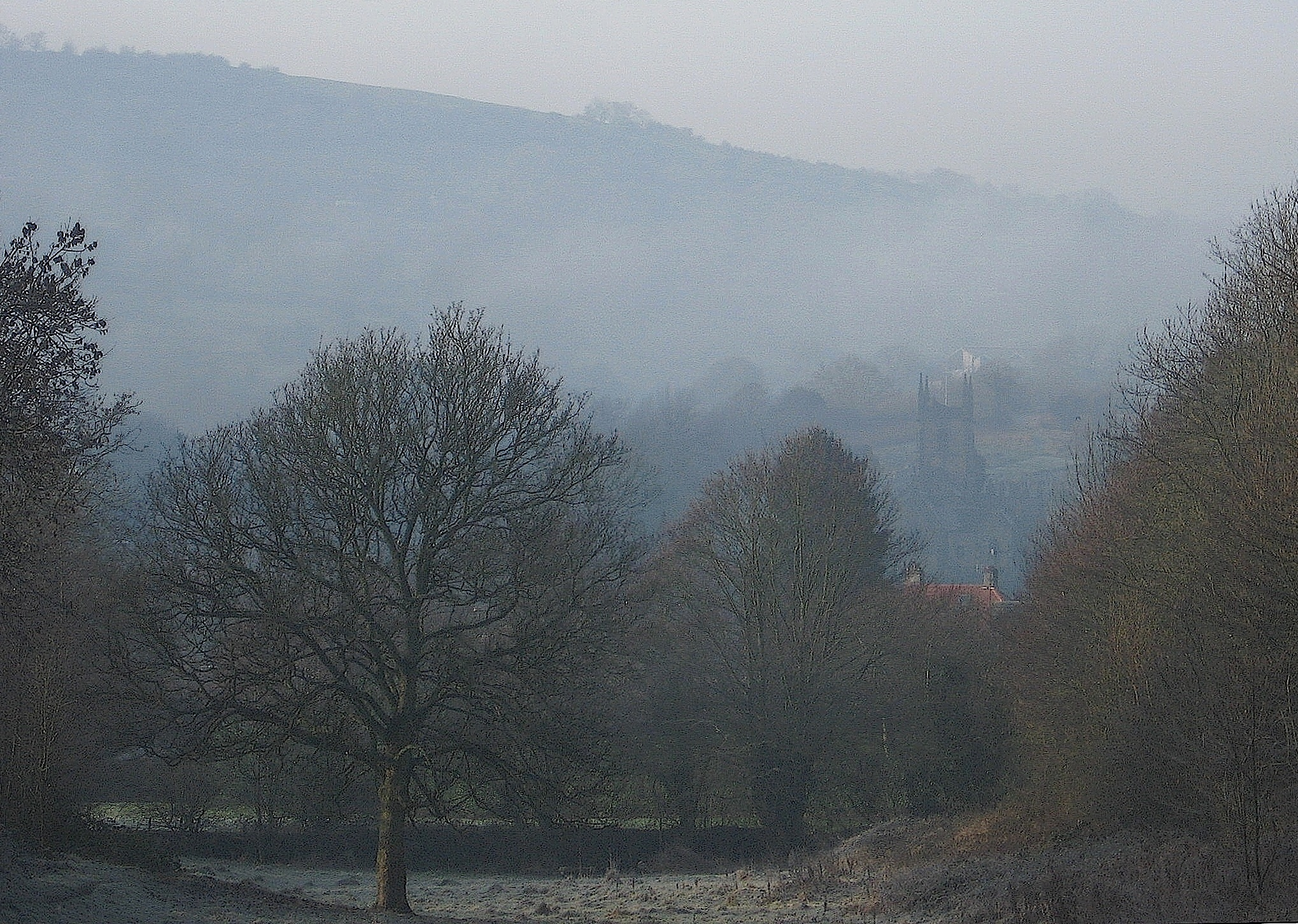
Matlock morning view from east, Lumsdale

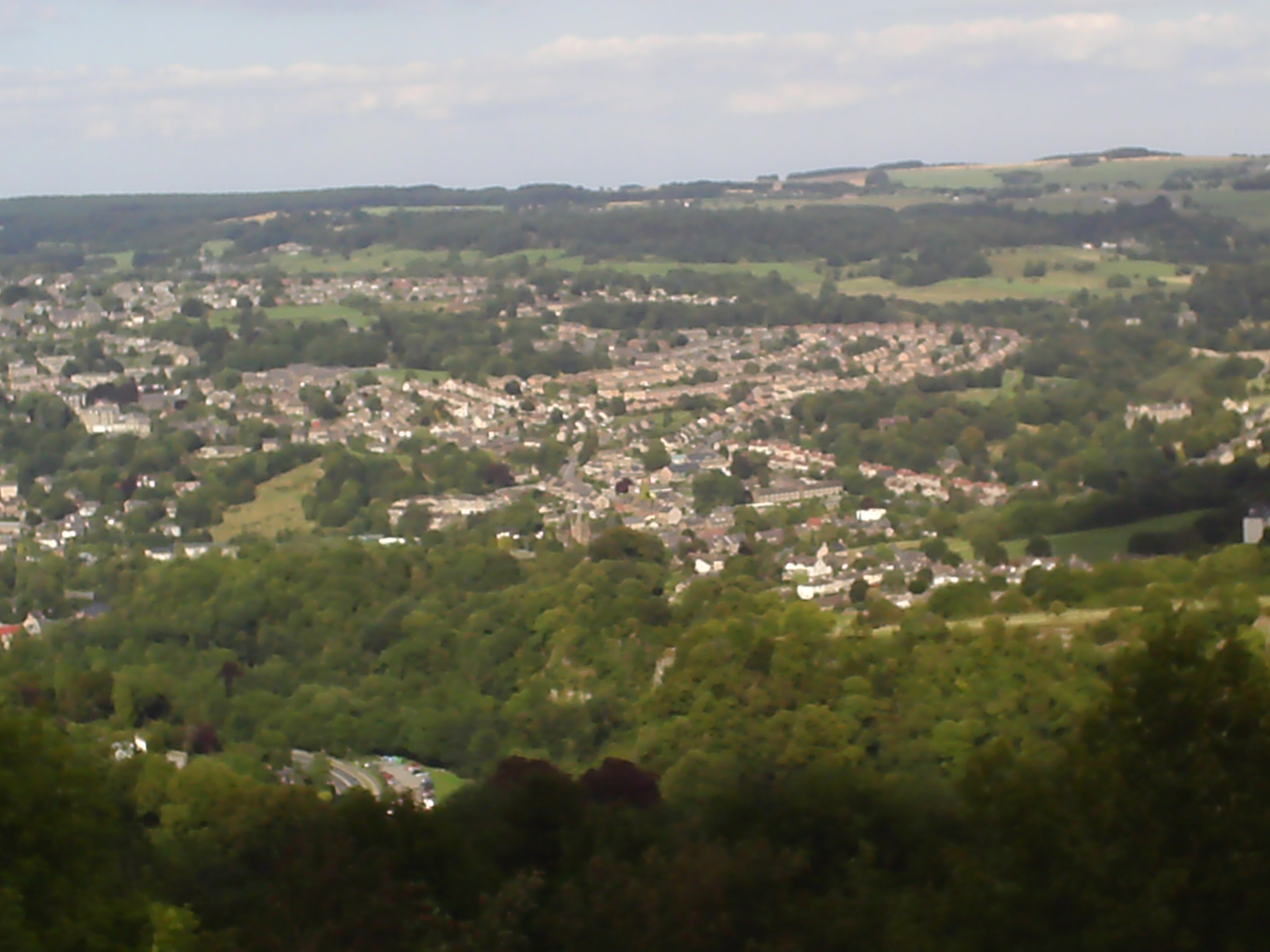
Matlock viewed from a nearby ridge

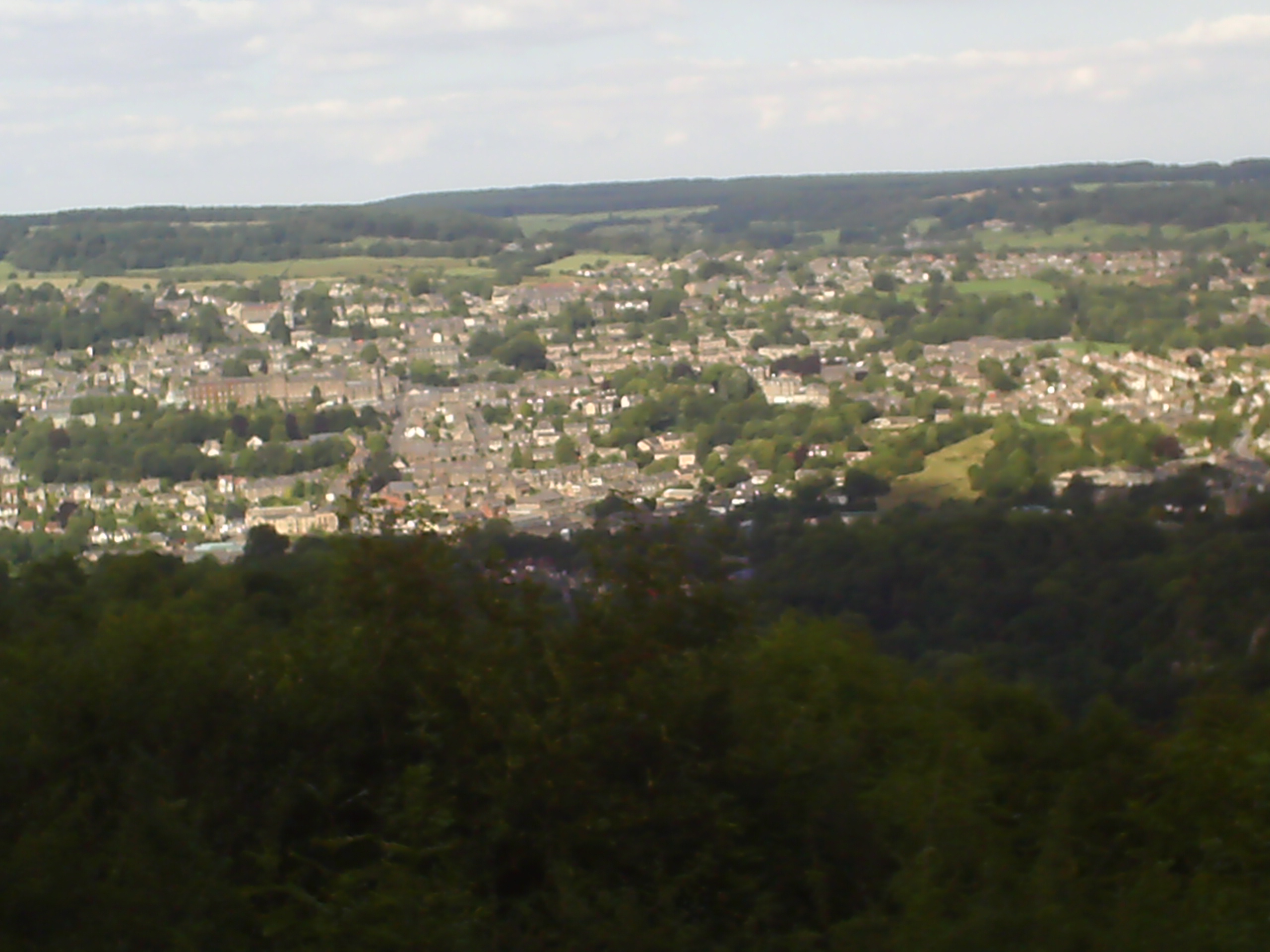
The town enjoys the Sun's rays as shade approaches

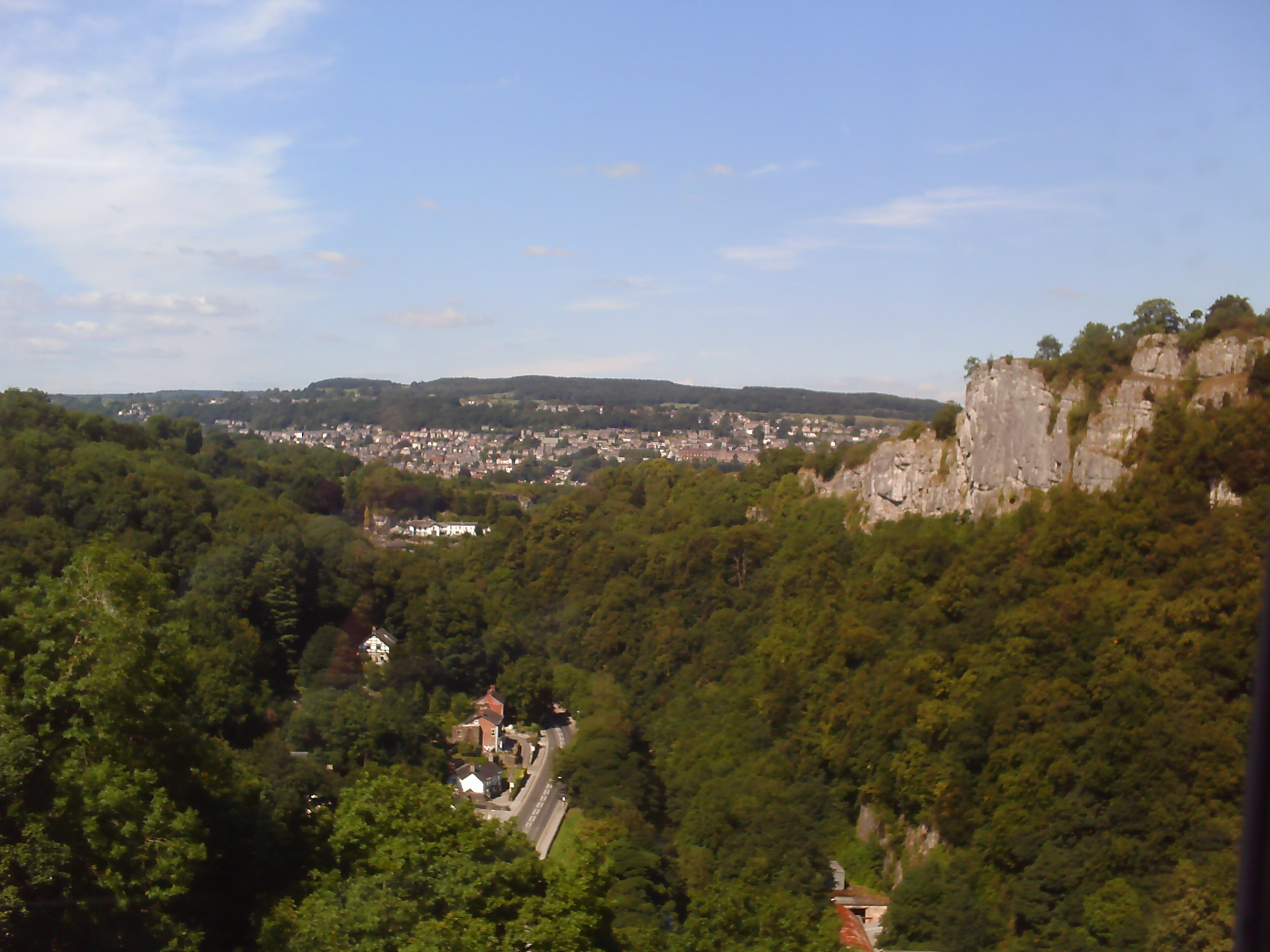
The town as seen from the nearby cable cars

== See also ==
- Listed buildings in Matlock Town
