= First Open =

British Rail First Open
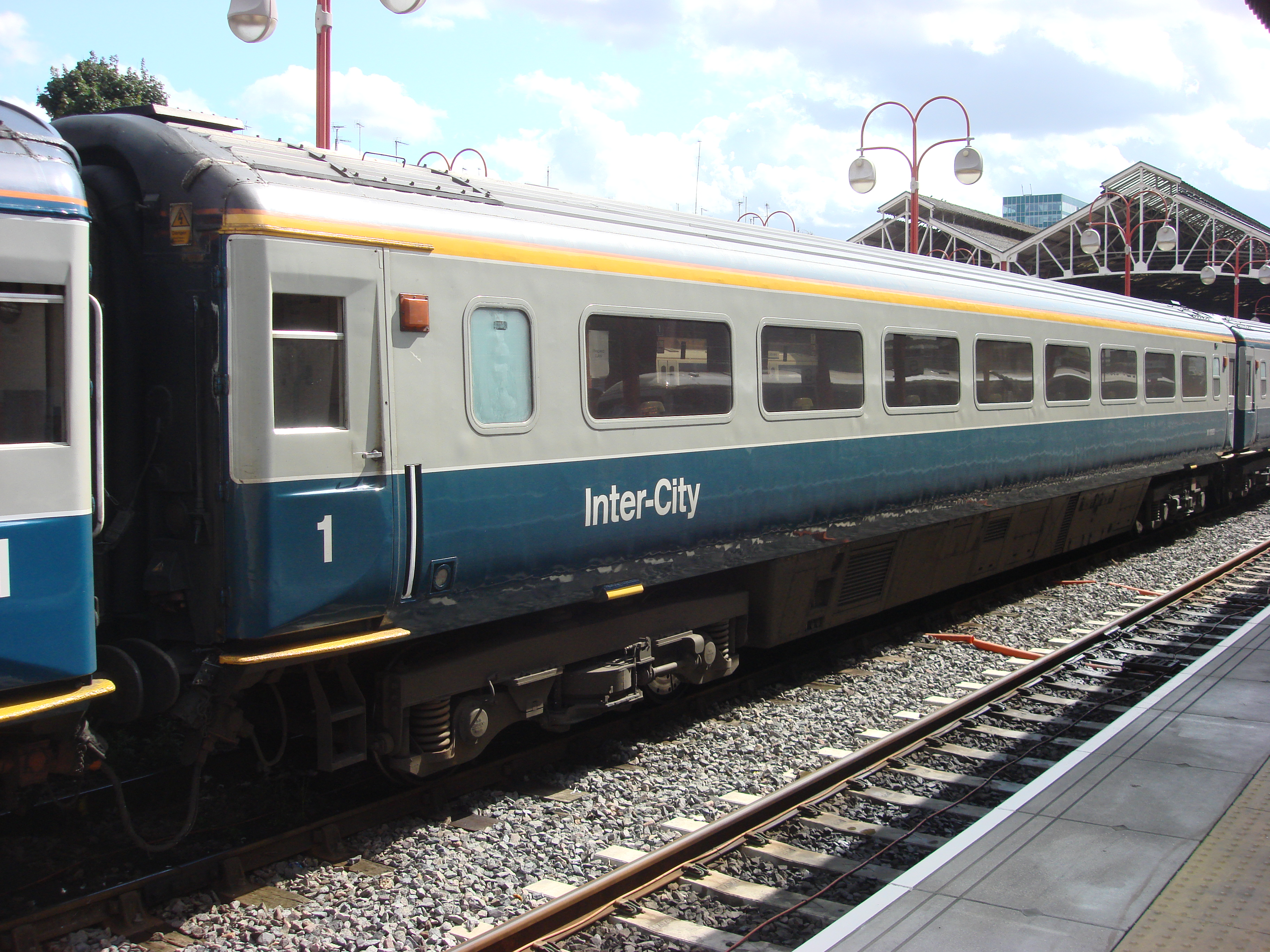
- Mark 3 First Open coach at Marylebone in September 2008
- In service: 1951–
- Manufacturers: Derby Litchurch Lane Works; Doncaster Works; Swindon Works; Wolverton Works; York Carriage Works; Birmingham Railway Carriage & Wagon Company; Metro-Cammell
- Family name: British Railways Mark 1, Mark 2, Mark 3 and Mark 4
- Constructed: Mk1 1951–1963; Mk2 1970-74; Mk3 1976-85; Mk4 1989-92
- Fleet numbers: Mk1: 3000-3151; Mk2c: 3152-3169; Mk2d: 3170-3216; Mk2e: 3221-3275; Mk2f: 3276-3439; Mk3: 11000-11003/41003-41169; Mk3a: 11004-11063; Mk3b: 11064-11101; Mk4: 11200-11263
- Capacity: Mk1: 42; Mk2c/d/e/f: Mk3/a/b: 48; Mk4: 46
- Operators: British Rail; InterCity; ScotRail; Abellio Greater Anglia; Anglia Railways; Arriva CrossCountry; Cargo-D; Chiltern Railways; Direct Rail Services; East Coast; East Midlands Railway; East Midlands Trains; East Midlands Railway; First Great Western; FM Rail; GNER; Midland Mainline; National Express East Anglia; National Express East Coast; London North Eastern Railway; Riviera Trains; Virgin CrossCountry; Virgin Trains East Coast; Virgin Trains West Coast; West Coast Railways

Specifications
- Car length: Mk1: 64 ft 6 in (19.66 m); Mk2/a: 65 ft 4 in (19.91 m); Mk2b/c/d/e/f: 66 ft 0 in (20.12 m); Mk3/a/b: 75 ft 0 in (22.86 m); Mk4: 23.4 m (76 ft 9 1/4 in)
- Width: Mk1: 9 ft 3 in (2.82 m); Mk2/a:9 ft 3 in (2.82 m); Mk2bb/c/d/e/f: 66 ft 0 in (20.12 m); Mk3/a/b:75 ft 0 in (22.86 m); Mk4: 2.74 m (8 ft 11 7/8 in)
- Height: Mk1 & Mk2: 12 ft 9 1/2 in (3.90 m)
- Doors: Mk1 Manual slam doors, two on each side Mk2c/d/e/f Manual slam doors, two on each side Mk3/a/b Manual slam doors, two on each side (some modified to automatic plug doors); Mk4 Automatic plug doors, two on each side
- Maximum speed: BR1/Cw: 90 mph (145 km/h); B4: 100 mph (161 km/h); BT10: 125 mph (201 km/h); SIG/BT41: 140 mph (225 km/h)
- Weight: 32.5 to 36.5 long tons (33.0 to 37.1 t; 36.4 to 40.9 short tons)
- HVAC: Steam or electric heat, or both
- Bogies: BR1, Commonwealth, B4, BT10 or SIG/BT41
- Braking systems: Vacuum, air, or both
- Coupling system: Drop-head knuckle coupler on draw-hook (dual)
- Track gauge: 4 ft 8 1/2 in (1,435 mm) standard gauge

A First Open or FO, is a type of railway carriage used by British Rail and subsequent operators since privatisation. They were first produced as British Railways Mark 1, and subsequently Mark 2, Mark 3, and Mark 4 variants were produced. This type of carriage is an "open coach" because of the arrangement of the seats inside – other types of carriage may be corridor based variants (FK) or have a brake compartment (BFO or BFK).

== Mark 1 ==
First Open carriages were introduced from 1951. The first three, for the London Midland Region, were the only Mk1 FO with no centre door, seating 42 in a 2+1 format. The second batch (3003–19), built from 1954, had a centre door in the centre seating bay, splitting the middle window into two thin panes. Carriages from 3020 had a separate centre vestibule with doors and reduced-width bays, still seating 42 in 2+1 format. BR1 type bogies were fitted as standard except on 3076–3080, a test batch built with Commonwealth bogies to improve ride quality. The ride quality of the BR1 bogie became poor after some use and, in 1961, changes were made. 3101–3151 were built with Commonwealth type bogies which became standard for a time, with the weight increasing by 5 tons.

BR1 and Commonwealth bogies usually run at a maximum of 90 mph (140 km/h). Later, B4 bogies were fitted to further improve ride quality with a maximum of 100 mph (160 km/h). These carriages were fitted with Pullman gangways on standard 64 ft (20 m) frames and fitted with buck-eye couplers as standard. Buck-eye couplers can be dropped and buffers extended to allow use of screw coupling fitted locomotives. Vacuum brakes and steam heating were fitted as standard. A number of Mk1 FO were later fitted with air brakes in the late 1960s and 1970s, some retaining vacuum brakes and being dual braked.

=== Orders ===
Fleet numbers	Built	Diagram	Builder	Lot No.
3000-3002	1951	71	York	30010
3003-3019	1954	72	BRCW	30008
3020-3039	1954	73/AD103	Doncaster	30042
3040-3057	1954	73/AD103	Doncaster	30091
3058-3070	1955	73/AD103	Doncaster	30169
3071-3080	1956	73/AD103	Doncaster	30242
3081	1957	77	BRCW	30359
3082	1957	76	Cravens	30361
3083	1957	74	Doncaster	30372
3084	1957	75	Doncaster	30373
3085-3094	1959	73/AD103	BRCW	30472
3095-3100	1959	73/AD103	BRCW	30576
3101-3103	1961	73/AD103	Wolverton	30648
3104-3129	1963	73/AD103	Swindon	30697
3130-3151	1963	73/AD103	Swindon	30717

=== Livery ===
The livery initially for Mk1 coaches for British Railways in 1951 was crimson lake and cream with black and gold lining, all new Mk1 FO coaches were delivered in this livery up until 1956. In 1956 the standard livery changed to maroon with black and gold lining except for the Southern Region stock which adopted an unlined dark malachite green. The Western Region on the other hand adopted chocolate and cream to sufficient stock to operate its named trains like the Cornish Riviera Express and Torbay Express being two examples. The Southern Region introduced the yellow UIC cantrail stripe denoting first class in 1960 for boat train coaches. Yellow UIC cantrail stripe was later introduced on other regions from 1963. In 1965 Rail Blue was introduced as trailed on XP64 stock the year before and lasted for another 20 years.

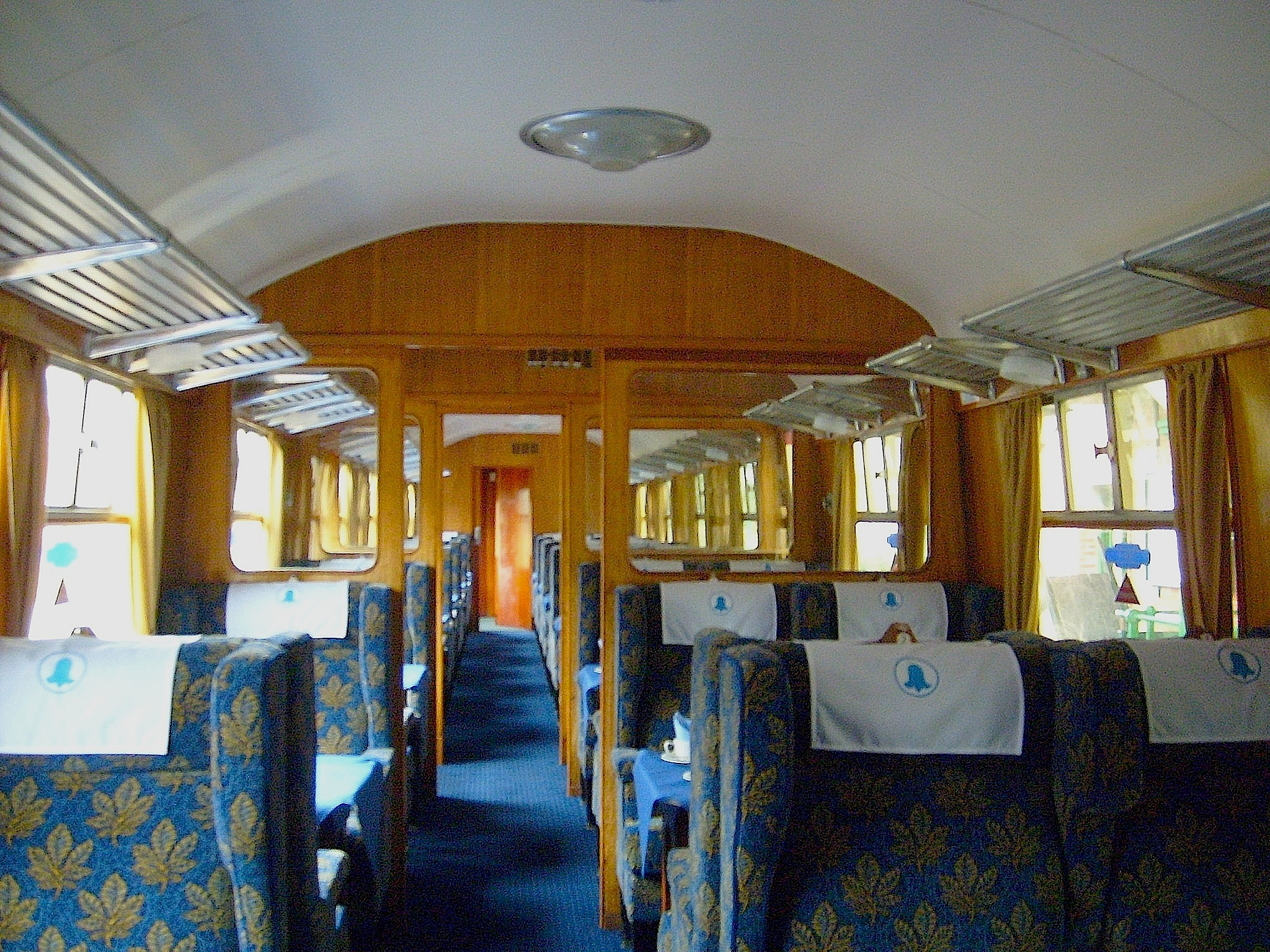
Mk1 First Open interior

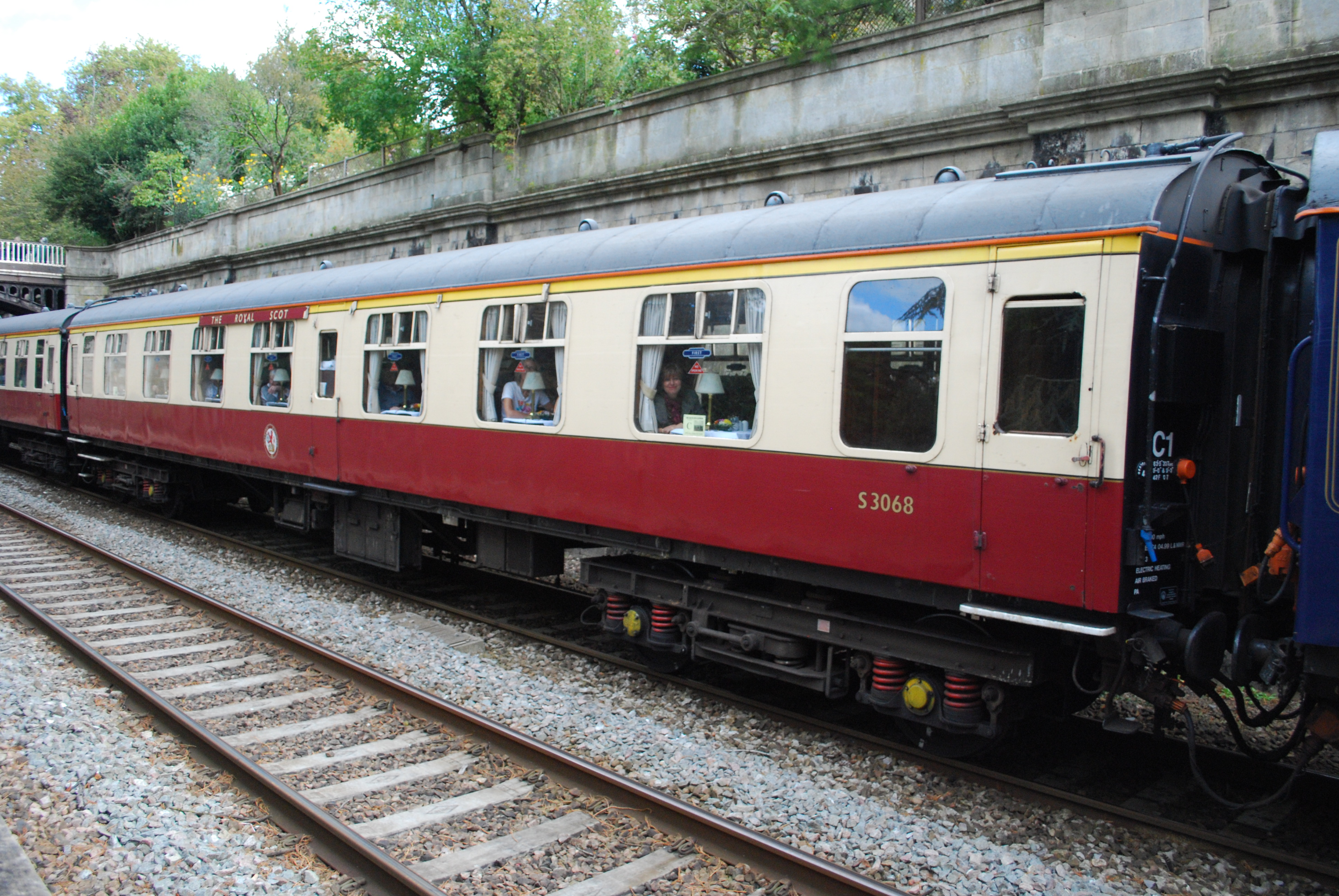
Mk1 First Open 3068 in the original red and cream livery pictured at Sydney Gardens, Bath in 2011

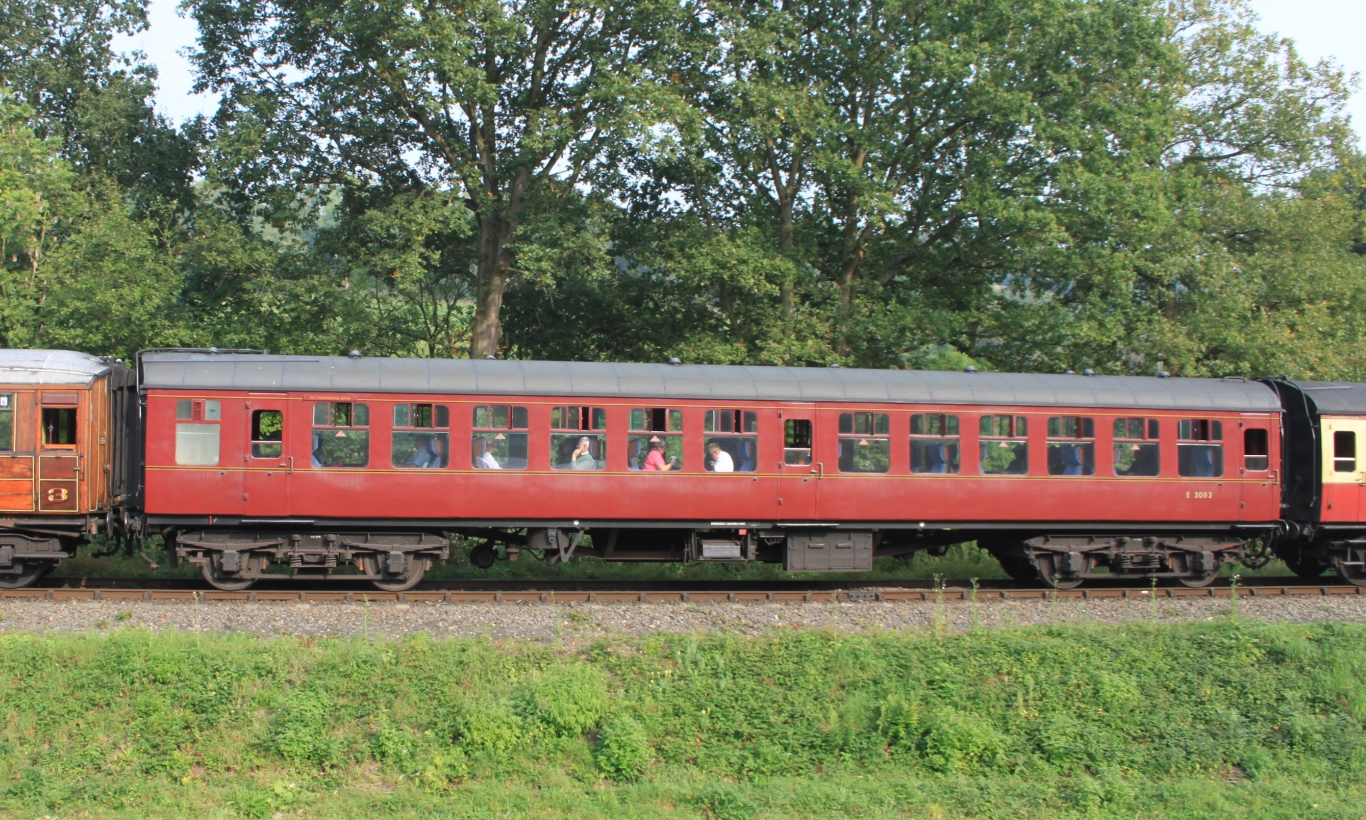
Doncaster 1957 Prototype Mk1 First Open 3083 in maroon livery pictured at Highley, Severn Valley Railway in 2014

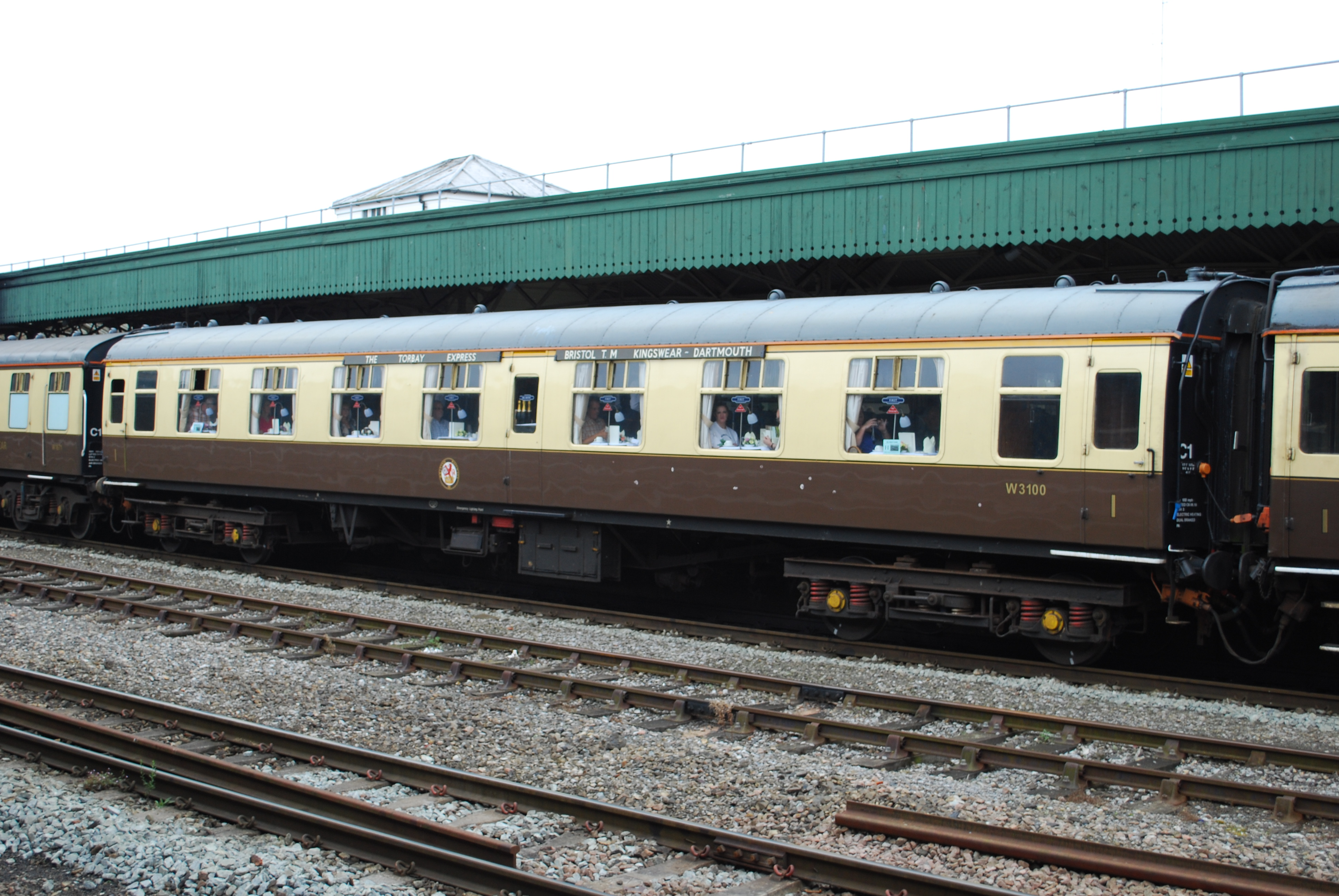
Mk1 FO 3100 BR(W) Chocolate & Cream livery, Bristol Temple Meads 2012

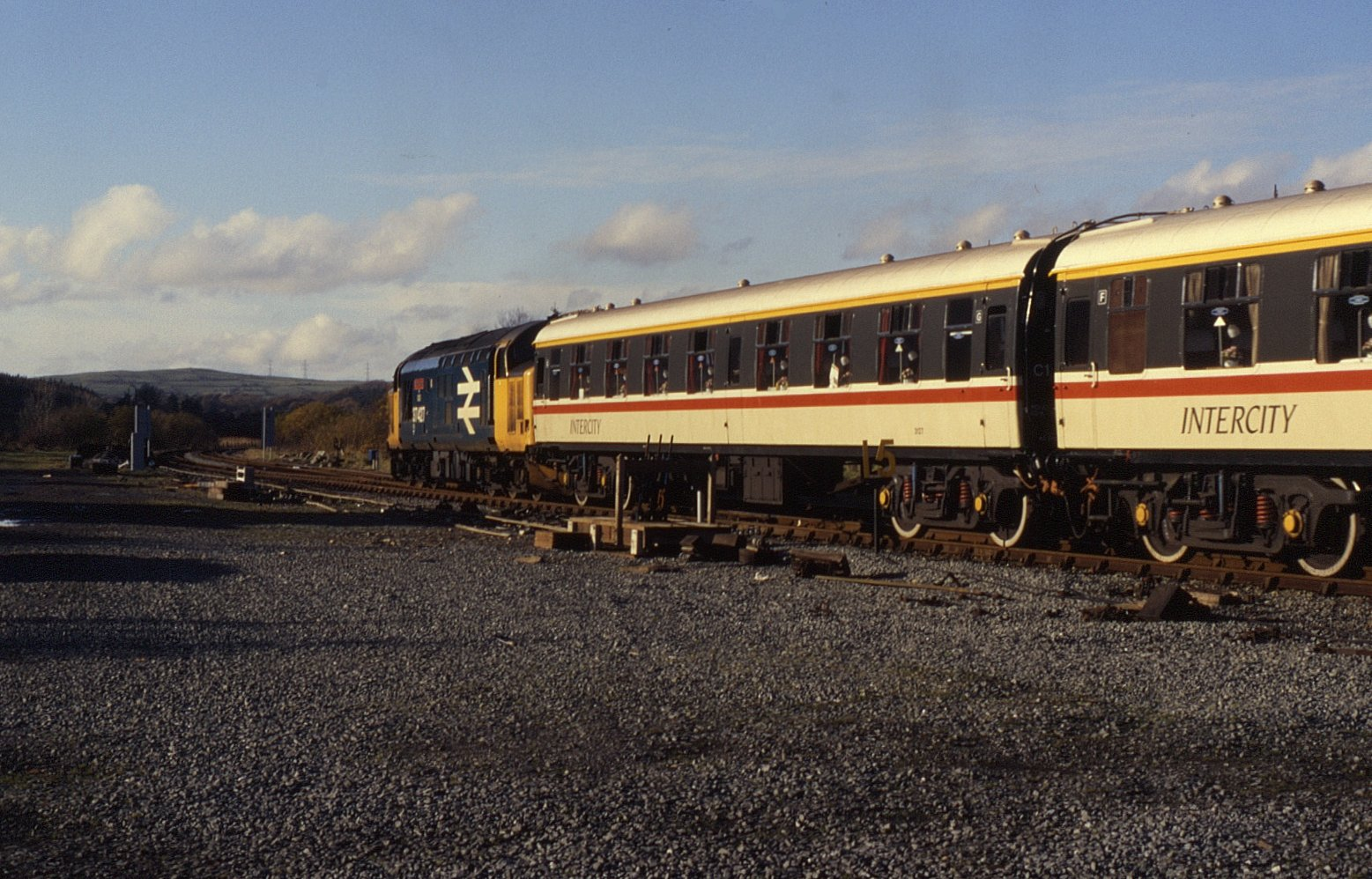
Mk1 FO in InterCity livery in November 1988

=== Mark 1 FO conversions ===
In 1976, 13 First Open were converted to Restaurant Second Open No Kitchen 1058-1070 RSO, 12 were later converted to Second Open 3600-3610 SO in 1981–82, 5 of the remaining SO in 1987 were converted back to First Open 31xx FO.

FO	RSO	SO	FO	FO	RSO	SO	FO
3128	1058	3600		3143	1065	3609	3143
3135	1059	3601	3135	3144	1066	3602	3144
3136	1060	3605		3145	1067	3610	3145
3138	1061	3607		3146	1068	3606	
3139	1062			3147	1069	3604	3147
3141	1063	3608		3148	1070	3611	
3142	1064	3603					

=== Departmental use ===
FO	Departmental	Notes
3009	ADB975631	CM&EE Test Car 9
3011	ADB975630	CM&EE Test Car 8
3012	DB975862	CCE Staff Coach, Carlisle Upperby
3013	ADB975653	HST Barrier Coach ER/ScR
3014	ADB975658	HST Barrier Coach ER/ScR
3015	ADB975649	HST Barrier Coach ER/ScR
3016	ADB975650	HST Barrier Coach ER/ScR
3049	DB977389	Barrier coach for DW139 RCE Track Recording Coach later Glasgow Works Test Train coach
3050	TDB977435	ECML Electrification driver training train coach
3052	TDB977431	ECML Electrification driver training train coach
3054	ADB975999	Barrier Coach for trial running with Mk3a Sleepers
3055	TDB977433	ECML Electrification driver training train coach
3058	TDB975313	HST Instruction Coach
3060	TDB975314	TOPS HR4 Mobile Training Classroom
3062	TDB975312	TOPS HR1 Mobile Training Classroom
3064	ADB975607	CM&EE Test Car 7
3068	RDB975606	Laboratory Coach 2 'Electra'
3071	DB977388	Barrier Coach for DB977144 RCE Track Recording coach later Glasgow Works Test Train coach
3072	TDB977399	ECML Electrification driver training train coach
3079	TDB975315	TOPS HR3 Mobile Training Classroom
3082	ADB975278	Laboratory Coach 15, APT Kitchen Mock up
3085	ADB977491	Test Train, Electric Locos SF
3086	ADB977449	Crewe Works Test Train coach, Electric Locos
3087	ADB977450	Crewe Works Test Train coach, Electric Locos
3088	TDB977434	ECML Electrification driver training train coach
3089	ADB977351	Barrier Coach WR later MTA Brake Force Runner
3091	ADB977352	Brake force coach for DW139 RCE Track Recording Coach later MTA Brake Force Runner
3093	ADB977594	Mobile office & stores then Springburn test train coach
3136	DB977970	Brake Force Runner
3145	DB977192	Use with Track Testing Vehicles

== Mark 2 ==
The first Mk2 First Open were built to Mk2c design in 1970, followed by Mk2d from 1971 complete with air conditioning, with the ETH supply becoming standard along with a motor-alternator to provide the lighting, heating and air conditioning. The Mk2e was introduced in 1972–73 with introduction of fluorescent tubes for lighting with the major change being the more compact toilet. The final development was the Mk2f being introduced in 1973-75 which the interior design from the prototype Mk3s with improved seating and air conditioning through body side heaters. All the Mk2 veterans are fitted with B4 bogies with a maximum of 100 mph (160 km/h).

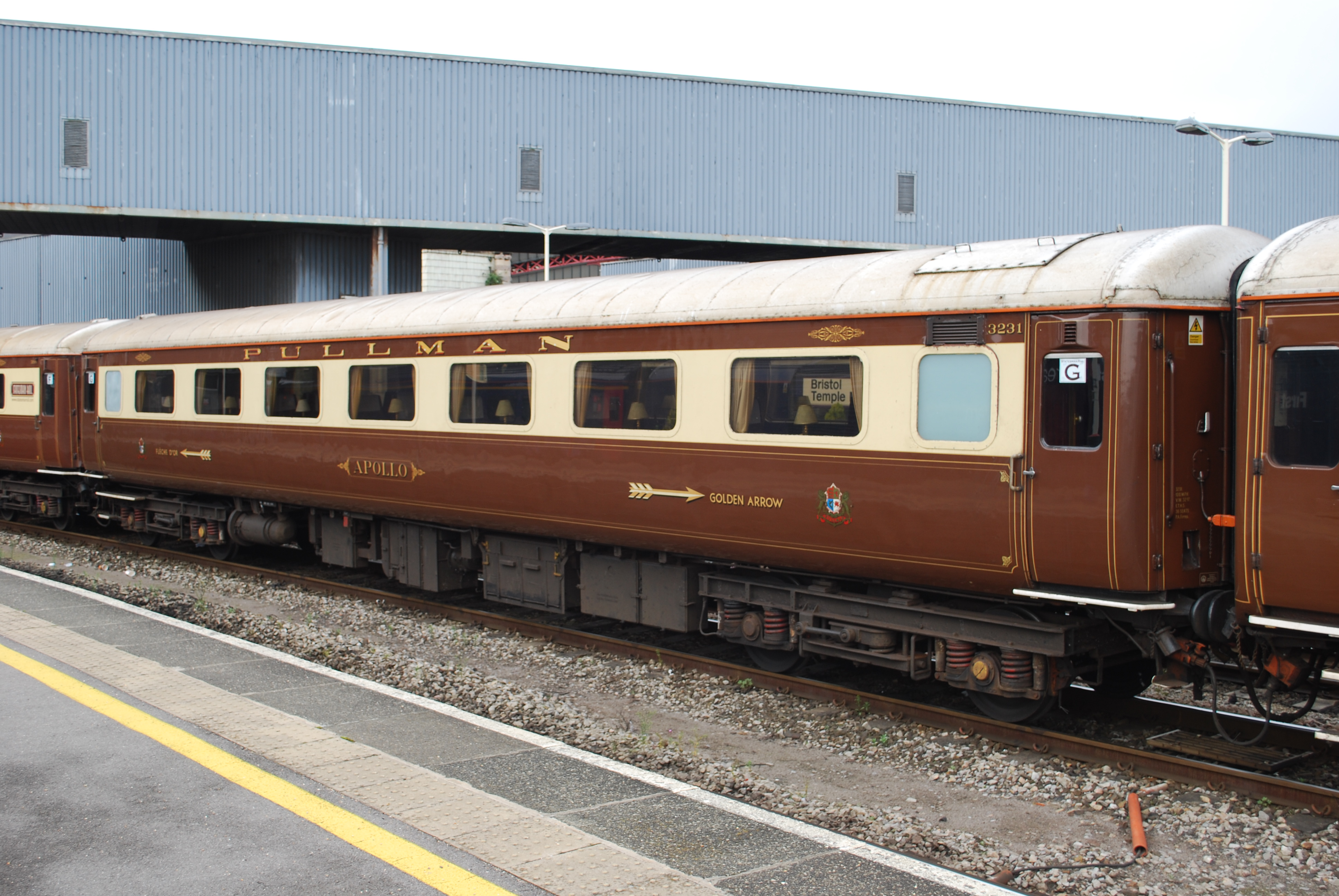
Mk2d First Open 3231 named Apollo of Railfilms in Pullman livery with Golden Arrow & Fleche d'Or branding at Bristol Temple Meads in August 2012

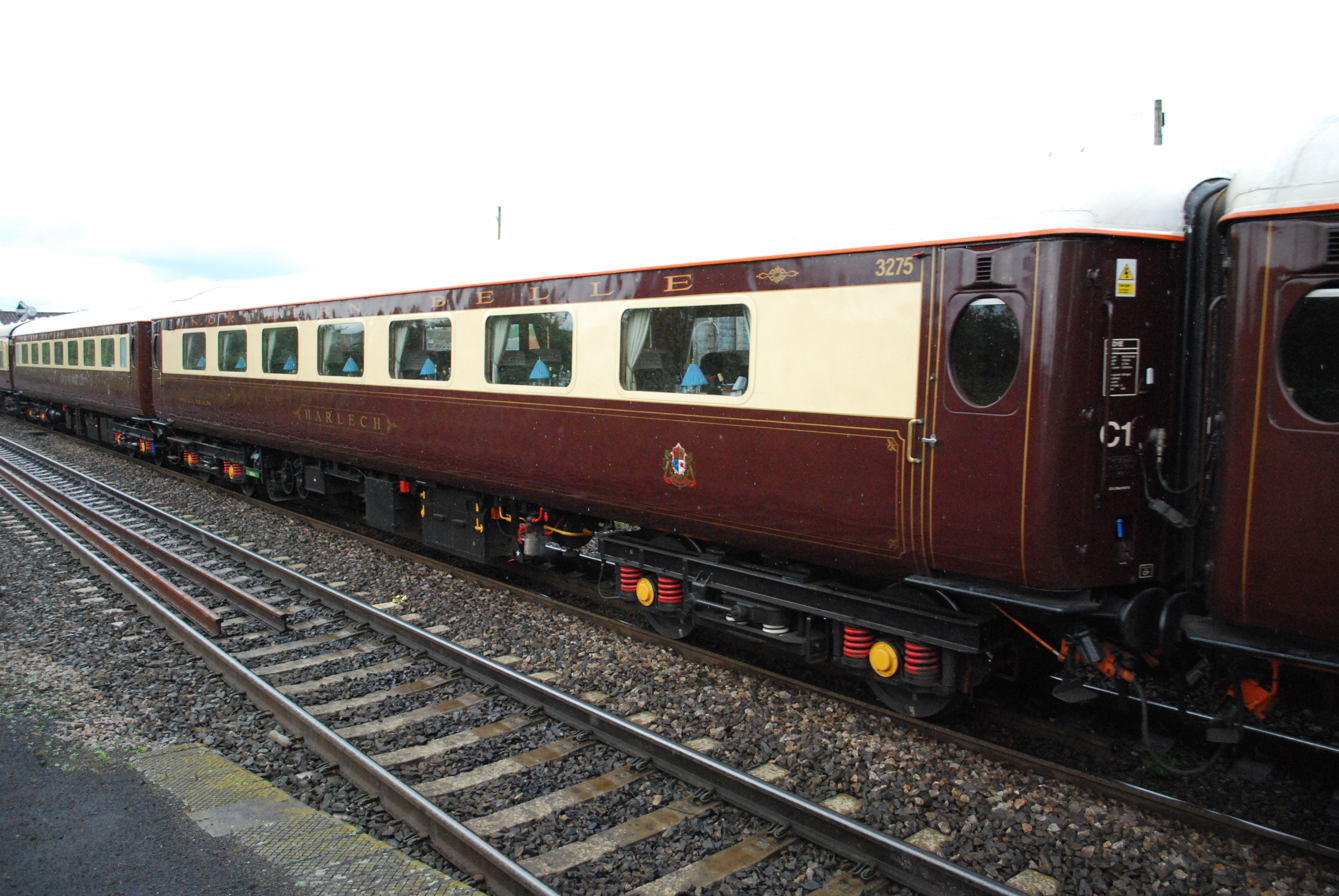
Mk2e First Open 3247 named Chatsworth of Venice-Simplon Orient Express' The Northern Belle in Pullman livery at Patchway in April 2012

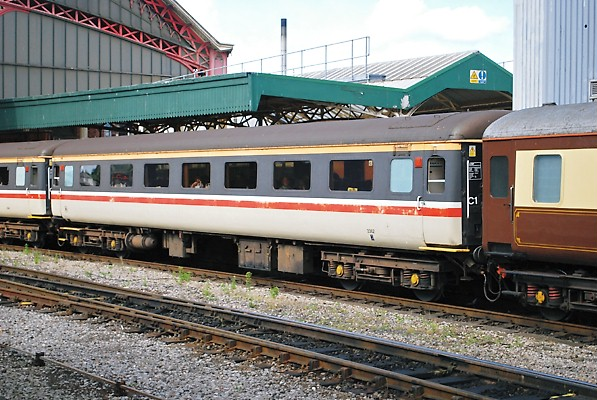
Mk2f First Open 3362 of West Coast Railways in unbranded InterCity Executive livery at Bristol Temple Meads in August 2009

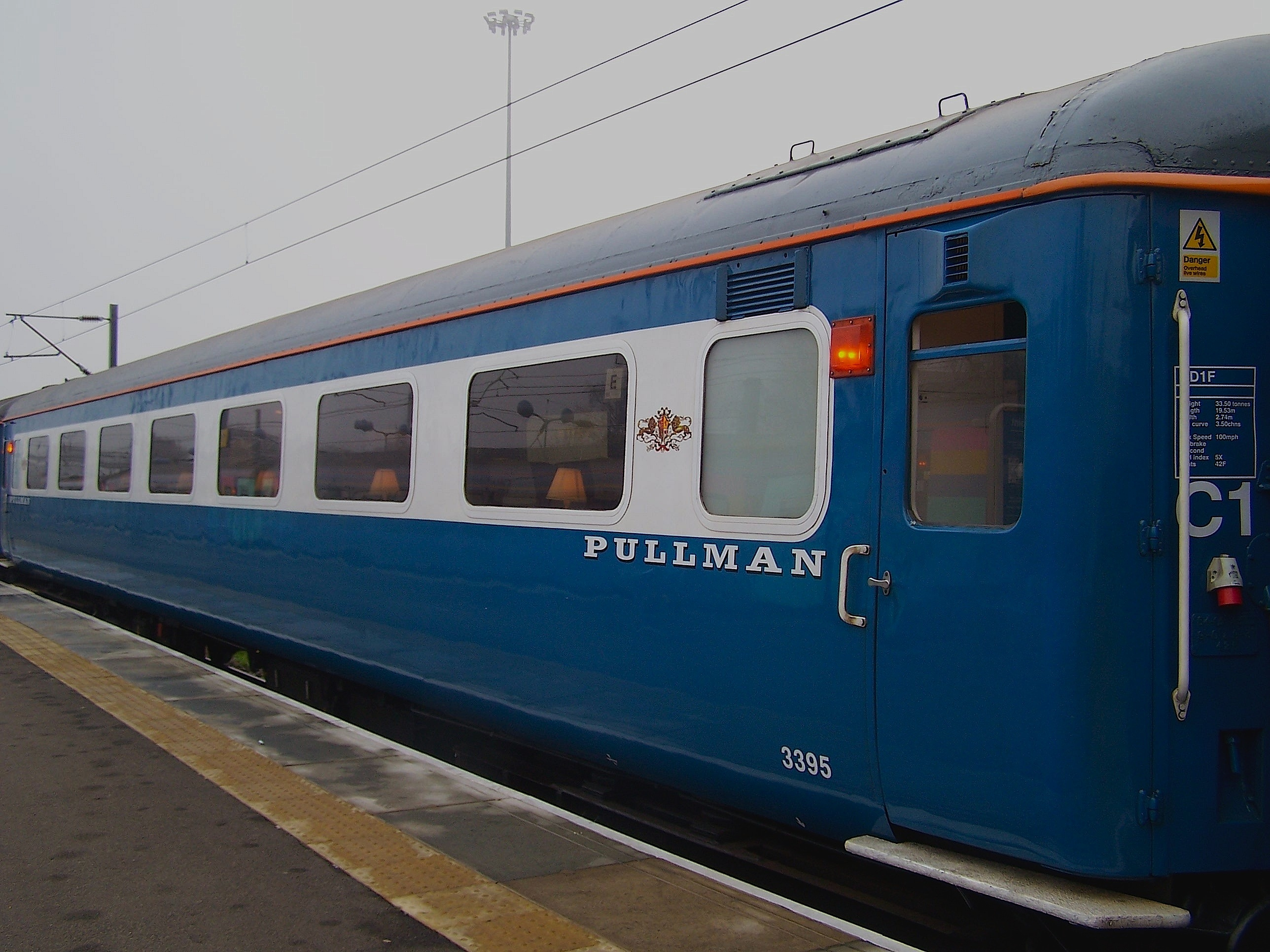
Mk2f First Open of FM Rail in Blue Pullman livery

=== Orders ===
Fleet numbers	Mark	Built	Diagram	Builder	Lot No.
3152-3169	2c	1970	80/AD104	Derby	30810
3170-3216	2d	1972	81/AD105	Derby	30821
3221-3275	2e	1973	82/AD106	Derby	30843
3276-3320	2f	1973	83/AD107	Derby	30845
3321-3428	2f	1974	83/AD107	Derby	30859
3429-3439	2f	1975	83/AD107	Derby	30873

=== Mark 2 FO conversions ===
- In 1982–84, 17 Mk2c coaches were converted to Second Open 6400-6416 SO.
- In 1983–84, 10 Mk2f coaches were converted to Class 488 EMU trailers 72500-72509 TFOH
- In 1985–86, 45 Mk2f coaches were converted to Second Open 6418-6465 SO later 6800-6829 TSO.
- In 1988, 9 Mk2f coaches were converted to Restaurant Lounge First Buffet later Sleeper reception car 6700-6708 RLO with 3 converted from Second Open 64xx.
- In 1988-89 / 1991, 33 Mk2f coaches were converted to Buffet Open First 1200-1221/1250-1260 RFB with 11 converted from Second Open 64xx.
- In 1989, 36 Mk2d coaches were converted to Second Open 6200-6235 TSO
- In 1990, 30 Mk2f coaches were converted to high-density Second Open 6800-6829 TSO with 72 seats were converted from Second Open 64xx.
- In 1992, 6 Mk2e coaches were converted to First Open (Pantry) 3520-3525 FOT.

Mk2c
Number	Type	2nd Number	Departmental	Irish Rail
3152	SO	6411	DB977547 West Ruislip (LUL) Brake Force Runner	
3153	SO	6404	DB977551 Mobile Track Assessment Brake Force Runner Old Oak Common	
3154	SO	6405		IR 4104
3155	SO	6415		
3156	SO	6406		IR 4103
3157	SO	6413		IR 4106
3158	SO	6403	DB977597 Doncaster Works Test Train	IR 4107
3159	SO	6407	DB977548 Brake Force Runner	
3160	SO	6402	DB977589 Brake Force Runner	
3161	SO	6414		
3162	SO	6408	DB977549 Mobile track assessment Brake Force Runner Old Oak Common	
3163	SO	6401		IR 4105
3164	SO	6410	DB977390 Barrier coach for DW139 Track Recording Coach later Crewe Works Test Train coach	
3165	SO	6416	DB977546 Springburn Works Test Train coach	
3166				NIR 903
3167	SO	6400		
3168	SO	6412		
3169	SO	6409	DB977550 Mobile Track Assessment Brake Force Runner Old Oak Common	

Mk2d
Number	Type	2nd Number	Notes	Number	Type	2nd Number	Notes
3170	TSO	6215	Exported to New Zealand	3197	TSO	6227	Exported to New Zealand
3171	TSO	6222	Exported to New Zealand	3198	TSO	6200	
3173	TSO	6221		3199	TSO	6232	Exported to New Zealand
3175	TSO	6220		3200	TSO	6225	Exported to New Zealand
3176	TSO	6212		3201	TSO	6228	Exported to New Zealand
3177	TSO	6209		3203	TSO	6226	
3179	TSO	6216		3204	TSO	6207	
3180	TSO	6203		3205	TSO	6208	Exported to New Zealand
3183	TSO	6206		3206	TSO	6233	
3184	TSO	6217	Exported to New Zealand	3207	TSO	6234	Exported to New Zealand
3185	TSO	6230	Exported to New Zealand	3208	TSO	6213	
3189	TSO	6231	Exported to New Zealand	3209	TSO	6218	
3190	TSO	6235	Exported to New Zealand	3210	TSO	6201	
3191	TSO	6202		3211	TSO	6214	Exported to New Zealand
3193	TSO	6205	Exported to New Zealand	3212	TSO	6229	Exported to New Zealand
3194	TSO	6223		3213	TSO	6219	
3195	TSO	6224	Exported to New Zealand	3215	TSO	6211	
3196	TSO	6210		3216	TSO	6204	

Mk2e
Number	Type	2nd Number	Notes
3236	FOT	3522	
3238	FOT	3523	
3253	FOT	3520	
3254	FOT	3524	
3255	FOT	3525	
3271	FOT	3521	

Mk2f
Number	Type	2nd Number	Type	3rd Number	Notes	Number	Type	2nd Number	Type	3rd Number	Notes
3276	SO	6418	RLO	6707		3349	SO	6442	TSO	6801	
3279	SO	6419	FO	3279	Conversion to SO 6419 not carried out	3355	SO	6443	TSO	6803	
3280	RFO	1252				3357	SO	6444	RFO	1217	
3281	SO	6458	TSO	6821		3361	SO	6445	RFO	1201	
3282	SO	6420	TSO	6815		3365	SO	6446	TSO	6819	
3283	SO	6421	RLO	6706		3367					NIR 904
3284	RFO	1255				3370	RLO	6708			
3287	SO	6459	RFO	1200		3371	RFO	1221			
3288	SO	6423	TSO	6829		3372	RFO	1250			
3289	SO	6424	TSO	6823		3376	SO	6447	TSO	6822	
3291	RFO	1203				3377	RFO	1215			
3294	SO	6425	TSO	6826		3378	RFO	1260			
3296	RFO	1256				3380	SO	6464	TSO	6828	
3297	SO	6426				3382	TFH	72501			
3298	SO	6427	TSO	6827		3383	RFO	1251			
3301	SO	6460	TSO	6825		3391	RFO	1254			
3302	RFO	1216				3393	RFO	1208			
3305	RFO	1211				3394	SO	6448	TSO	6812	
3306	SO	6428	TSO	6827		3396	SO	6449	TSO	6804	
3307	SO	6429	TSO	6824		3398	TFH	72509			
3308	RLO	6703				3401	RFO	1204			
3310	SO	6430	RLO	6705		3403	SO	6450	FO	3403	
3311	SO	6431	TSO	6817		3404	SO	6451	TSO	6810	
3315	SO	6432	RFO	1220		3405	SO	6462	RFO	1210	
3316	SO	6461	TSO	6816		3406	TFH	72504			
3317	SO	6433	RFO	1214		3407	TFH	72503			977983
3319	RFO	1206				3409	TFH	72508			
3320	SO	6434	TSO	6820		3410	SO	6463	TSO	6813	
3321	TFH	72502				3412	TFH	72507			
3322	RFO	1258				3413	TFH	72500			
3323	SO	6435	TSO	6800		3415	TFH	72505			
3324	SO	6436	TSO	6805		3418	RFO	1219			
3327	SO	6437	TSO	6811		3419	RFO	1213			
3328	SO	6422	RFO	1207		3421	RLO	6702			
3329	SO	6438	RFO	1205		3422	SO	6465	TSO	6814	
3332	RFO	1218				3423	SO	6452	TSO	6807	
3335	TFH	72506				3427	SO	6453	RFO	1212	
3339	SO	6439	TSO	6802		3430	SO	6454	TSO	6808	
3341	RLO	6704				3432	RFO	1253			
3342	SO	6440	TSO	6806		3435	SO	6455	TSO	6809	
3343	SO	6441				3436	SO	6456	RFO	1202	
3346	RLO	6701				3437	SO	6457	RFO	1209	
3347	RLO	6700				3439	RFO	1259			

=== Departmental use ===
FO		Departmental	Notes
3152	Mk2c	DB977547	Brake Force Runner
3153	Mk2c	DB977551	Mobile Track Assessment Brake Force Runner
3160	Mk2c	DB977589	Brake Force Runner
3162	Mk2c	DB977549	Mobile Track Assessment Brake Force Runner
3164	Mk2c	DB977390	REC Barrier coach later Crewe Works Test Train coach
3165	Mk2c	DB977546	Brake Force Runner
3169	Mk2c	DB977550	Mobile Track Assessment Brake Force Runner
3189	Mk2d	DB977986	Track Recording Train Coach later Structure Gauging train coach
3250	Mk2e	99666	Ultrasonic Test Coach
3407	Mk2f	DB977983	Hot Box Detection Coach later Electrification Measurement Coach

== Mark 3 ==
First Mk3 prototypes were built at Derby Litchurch Lane Works in 1972 for the new Class 252 and were built to 75 ft 0 in (22.86 m) with BT5 bogies with a maximum of 125 mph (201 km/h). Production built Mark 3 stock for class 253 and 254 InterCity 125 were built at Derby Litchurch Lane in 1975–82 with BT10 bogies with a maximum of 125 mph (201 km/h) seat 48 and referred to as a trailer First. Mark 3a is the production built loco-hauled Mk3 built by BR at Derby Litchurch Lane introduced on the West Coast Main Line from 1975.

From 1979, seven First Open were used on the Glasgow to Edinburgh push pull service 11004–11010 with 11022 added later as 11004 was involved in the Polmont rail accident in 1984. ScotRail later down graded its First Open in 1986 to Open Composite were renumbered 119xx. Two First Open 11021 and 11032 were fitted with BT15 bogies along with 11058 fitted with BTS bogies in the mid-1980s.

With a further order for 38 Mk3b built at Derby Litchurch Lane in 1985 and were delivered new in InterCity livery with a number receiving names and being used on services on the West Coast Main Line offering a first class Pullman service.

Number	Name	Number	Name
11073	William Ewart Gladstone	11084	William Roscoe
11074	Thomas Brassey	11085	Sir John Barbirolli
11076	John Lennon	11086	Henry Dalton
11077	Sir Richard Arkwright	11087	Sir William Fairbairn
11078	John Owens	11088	Sir John Brunner
11079	Francis Egerton	11089	George Stubbs
11080	Emmeline Pankhurst	11091	Sir Stanley Matthews
11081	Elizabeth Gaskell	11092	Ernest Rutherford
11082	James Joule	11093	LS Lowry
11083	Kitty Wilkinson	11094	Arnold Bennett

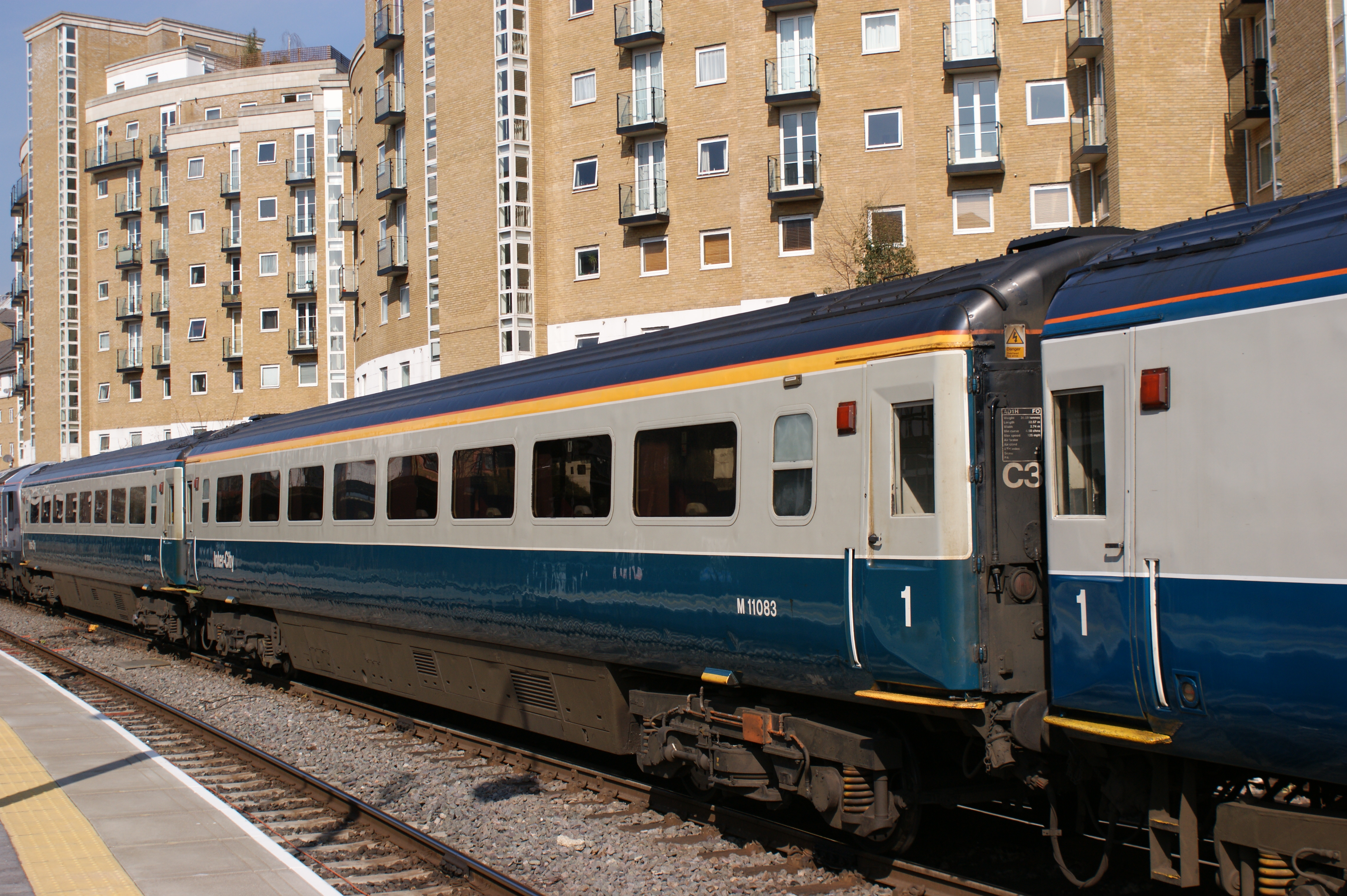
Mk3b First Open 11083 in BR blue grey livery at Marylebone in March 2009

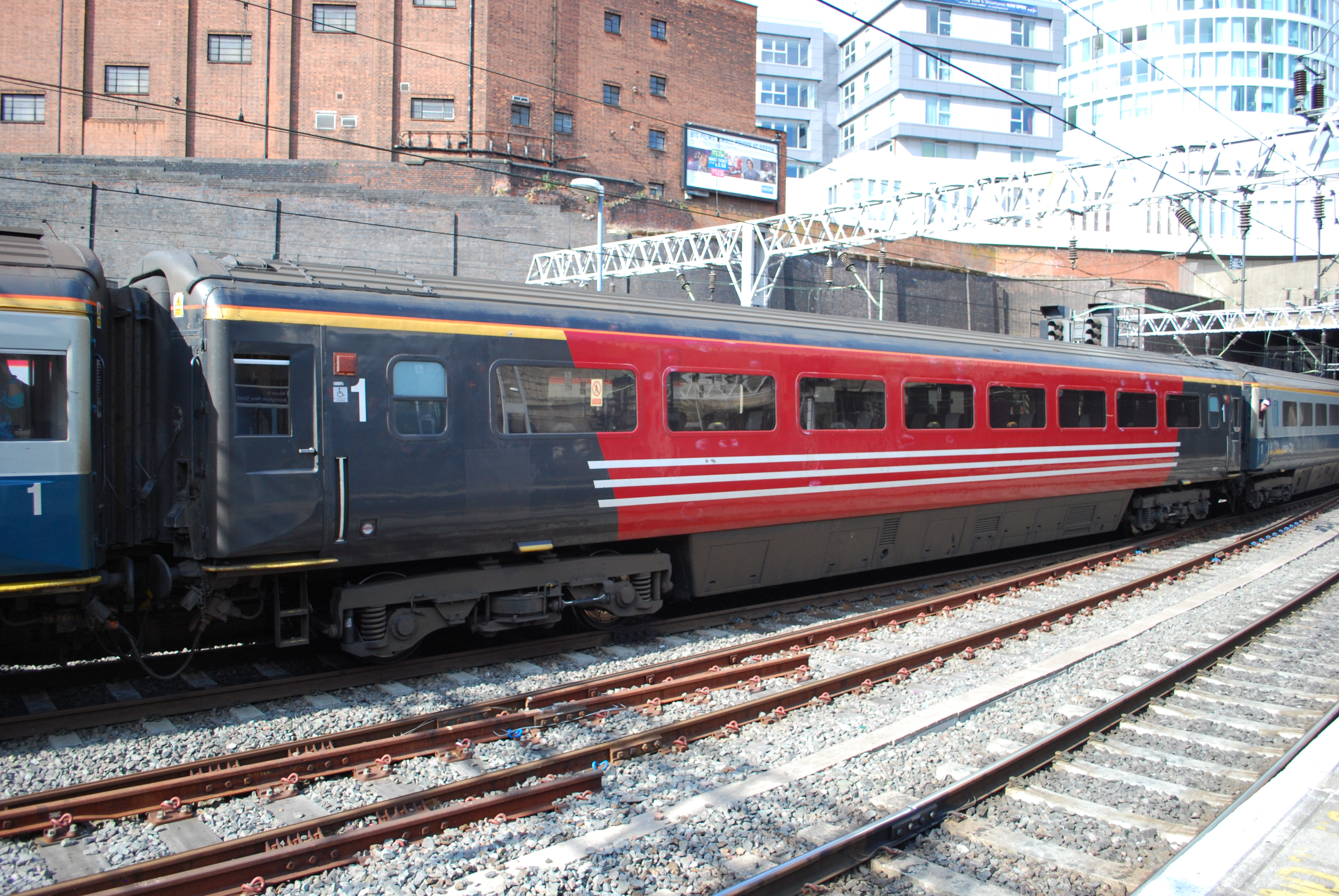
Mk3a First Open 11027 in original Virgin Trains West Coast livery at Birmingham New Street in July 2009

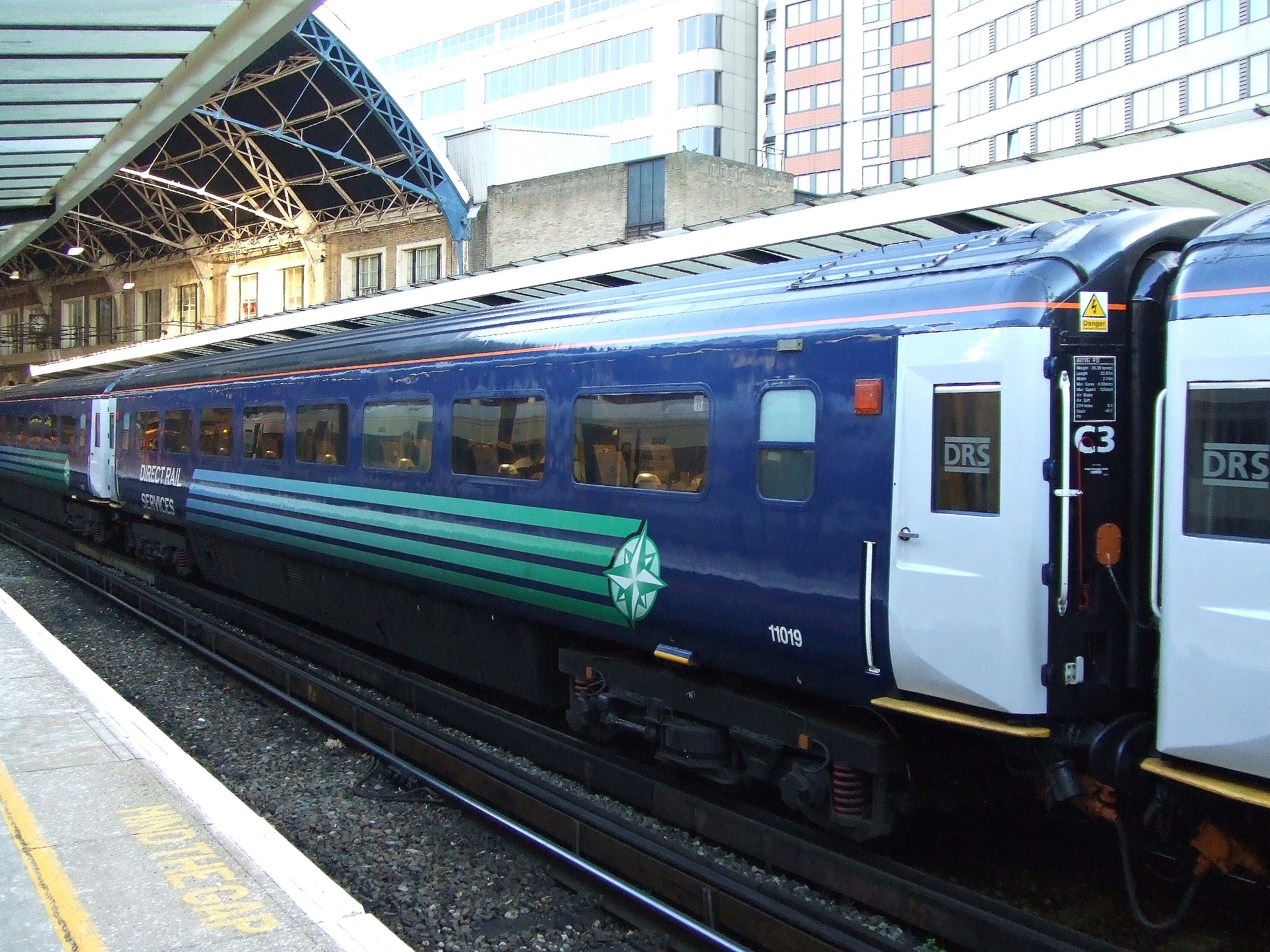
Mk3a First Open 11019 in Direct Rail Services livery at London Victoria in December 2007

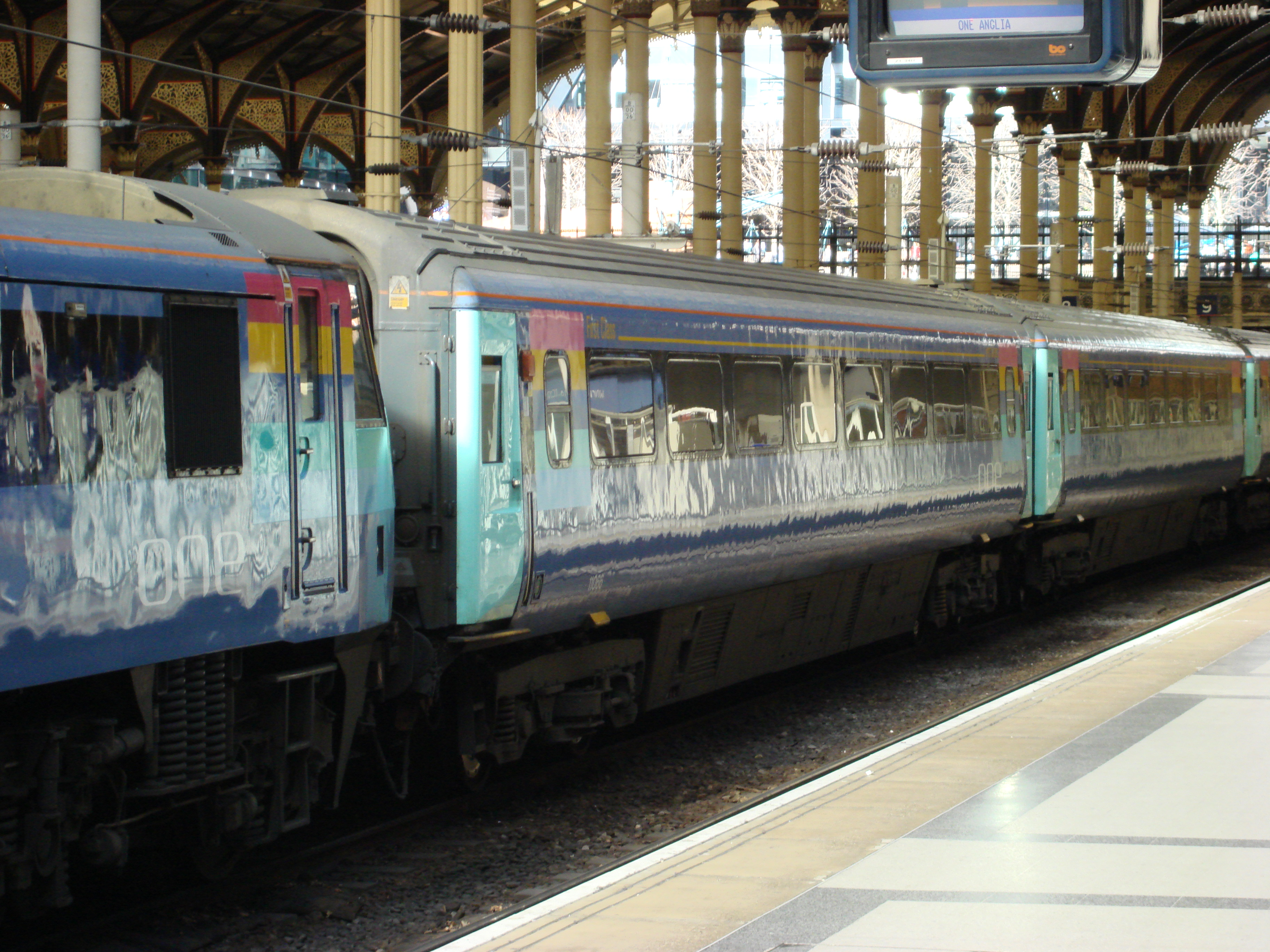
Mk3b First Open in One livery at London Liverpool Street in March 2007

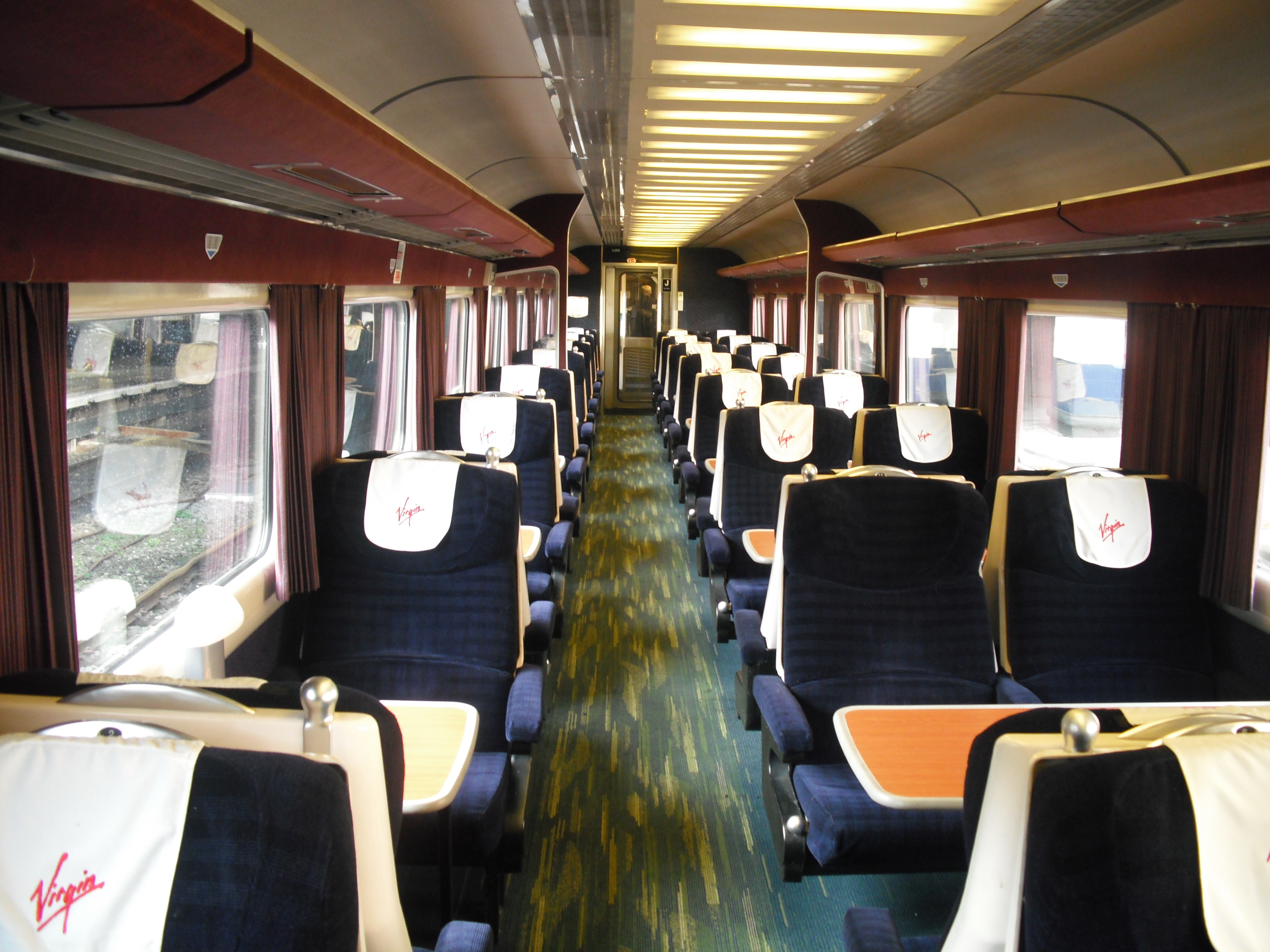
Virgin Trains West Coast Mk3a First Open Interior in December 2009.

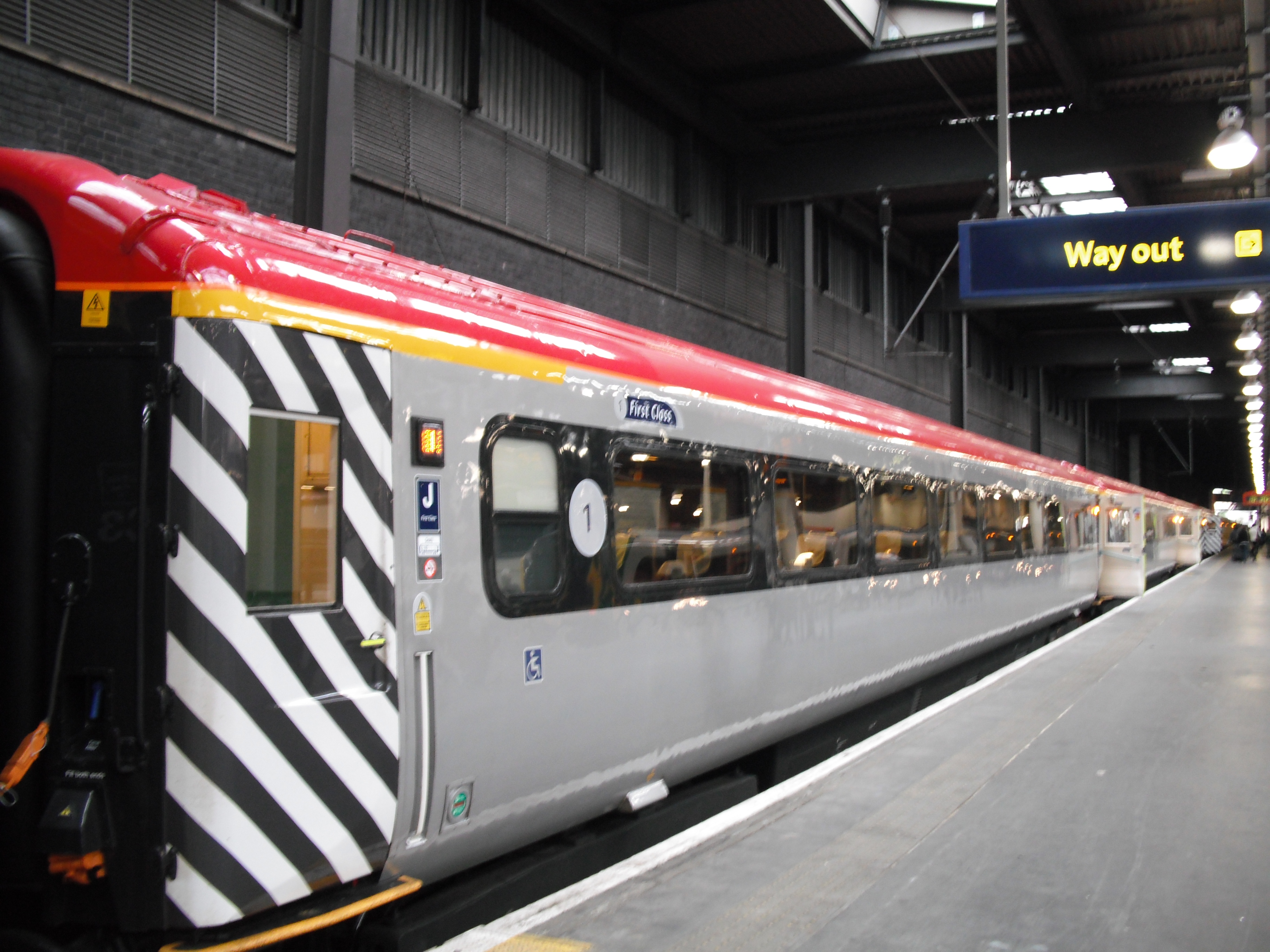
Mk3a First Open in Virgin Trains Silver livery at London Euston in August 2009.

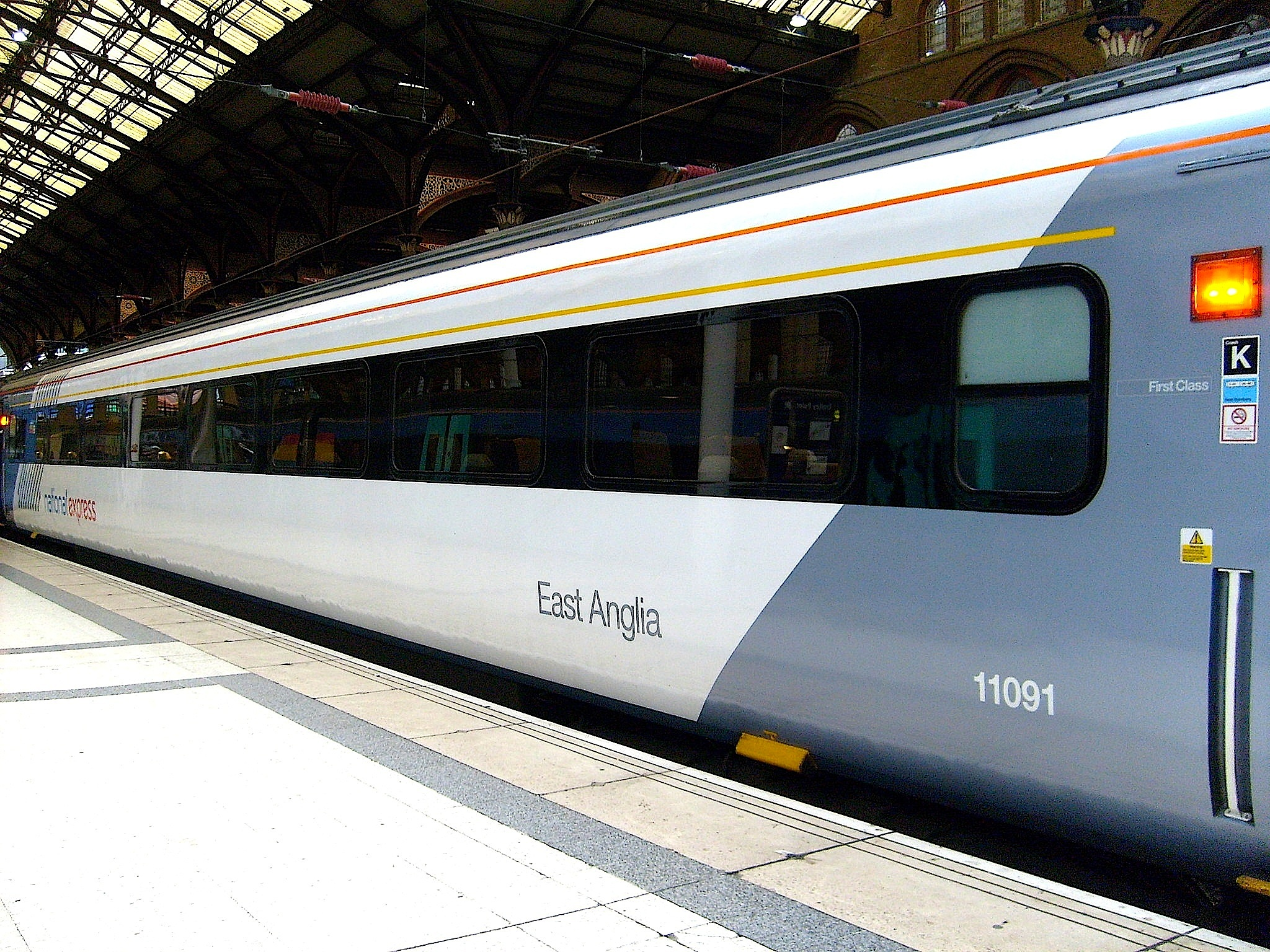
Mk3b First Open 11091 in National Express East Anglia livery at London Liverpool Street on 8 March 2008, Peter Skuce

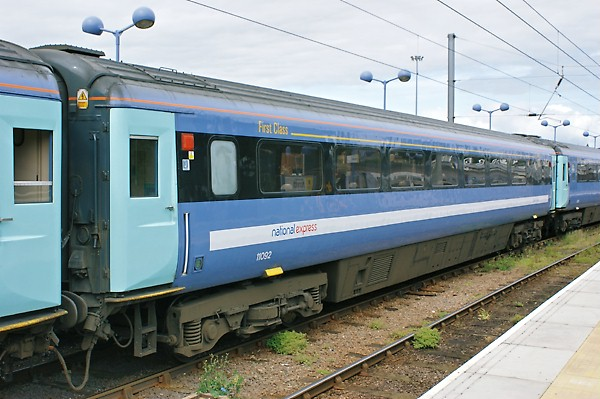
Mk3b First Open 11092 in debranded One livery with National Express branding at Norwich in June 2008

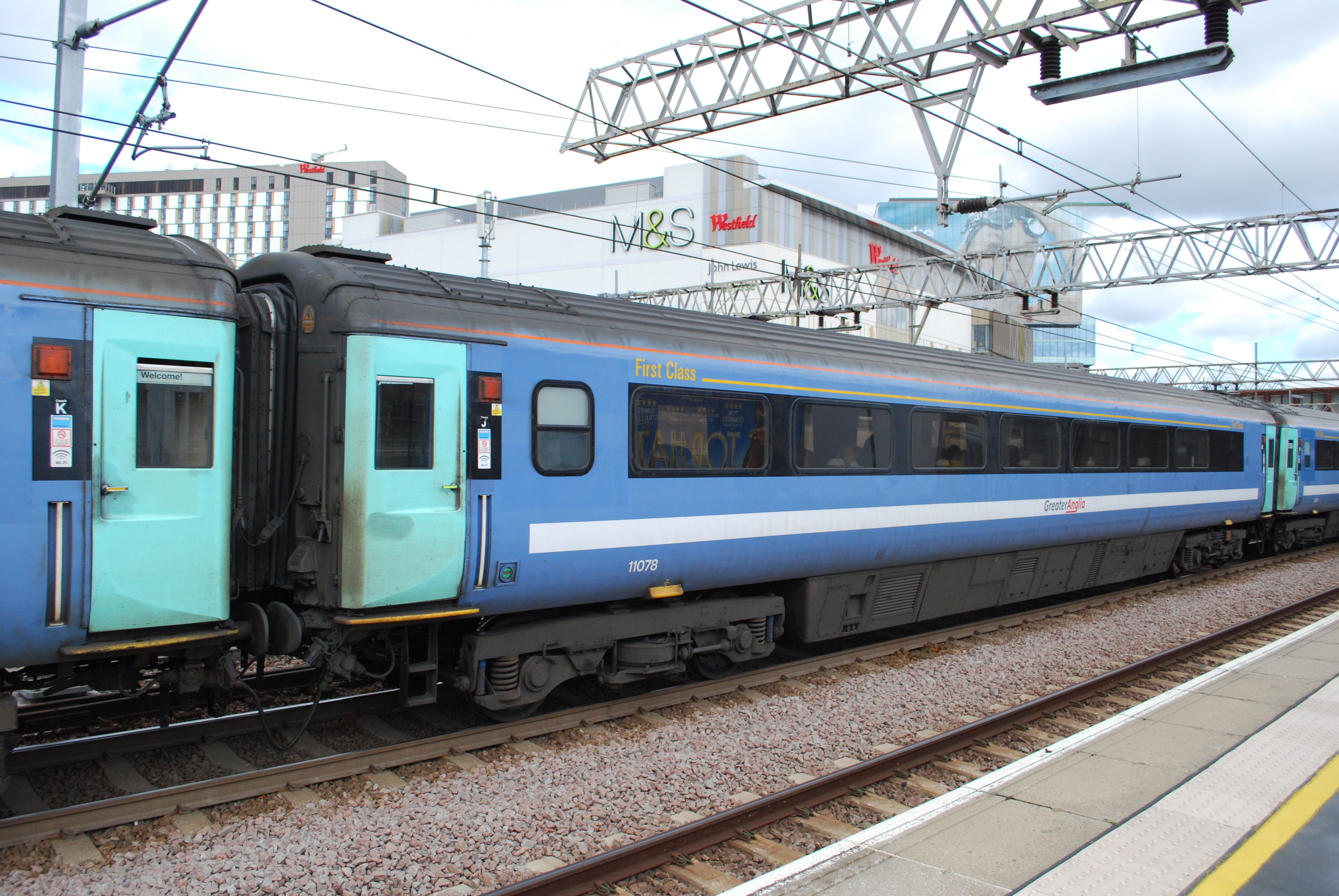
Mk3b First Open 11078 in debranded One livery with Greater Anglia branding at Stratford in August 2012

=== Orders ===
Fleet numbers	Mark	Built	Diagram	Builder	Lot No.
11000-11002	3	1972	665	Derby	30848
11003	3	1972	665	Derby	30833
11004-11063	3a	1975	69/AD108	Derby	30878
11064-11101	3b	1985	AD110	Derby	30982

=== Mark 3 FO conversions ===
- In 1975, 3 Mk3 First Open coaches were reclassified as Trailer First 41000-002 TF.
- In 1977, Mk3 First Open 11001 coach converted to The Queens Saloon and consists of a lounge, bedroom & bathroom, along with a bedroom & bathroom for the Queens dresser.
- In 1981, Mk3 Trailer First 41000 TF converted to M&EE Test Car 10 ADB975814 QXA.
- In 1982, 2 Mk3 Trailer First 41001-41002 TF coaches were converted to production HST Trailer First 4117x TF specification.
- In 1986, 7 Mk3a coaches were converted to Open Composite 119xx CO.
- In 1986–87, 18 Mk3a coaches were converted to Restaurant First Modular 10212-10229 RFM.
- In 1990, 4 Mk3a Open Composite coaches were converted to Standard Open 12169-12170 TSO.
- In 1990, 3 Mk3a Open Composite coaches were converted back to First Open regaining their former numbers.
- In 1992, Mk3 Trailer First 41174 TF were converted to Trailer Standard 42357 TS.
- In 2007–08, 6 Mk3a coaches were converted to Trailer First 41201-41206 TF
- In 2008, 3 Mk3a coaches were converted to Trailer First 41193-41195 TF.
- In 2011–13, 5 Mk3a First Open coaches were converted to Standard Open 126xx TSO
- In 2012, 6 Mk3a coaches First Open were converted to Standard Open 12176-12181 TSO.
- In 2015, 4 Mk3a coaches, First Open 11034 FO and 3 Restaurant First Modular 102xx RFM were converted to Standard Open Miniature Buffet 10413-416 TSOB

Mk3
1st Number	Converted to	2nd Number	Converted to	3rd Number	Converted to	4th Number
11000	TF	41000	Test Car 10	975814	New Measurement Train recording coach	
11001	Queens Saloon	2903				
11002	TF	41001	TF	41170		
11003	TF	41002	TF	41174	TS	42357
Mk3a
1st Number	Converted to	2nd Number	Converted to	3rd Number	Converted to	4th Number
11005	CO	11905	FO	11005		
11006	CO	11906	FO	11006		
11007	CO	11907	FO	11007		
11008	CO	11908	TSO	12169	TSO	12618
11009	CO	11909	TSO	12170		
11010	CO	11910	TSO	12171		
11012	RFM	10221				
11013	TSO	12182				
11014	RFM	10225				
11015	RFM	10226				
11016	TF	41194				
11017	TF	41202				
11019	TSOL	12623				
11020	TFD	41195				
11022	CO	11922	TSO	12172	TS	42383
11023	TF	41204				
11027	TSO	12183				
11030	TSO	12625				
11032	RFM	10215				
11034	RFM	10214	TSOB	10413		
11035	RFM	10228				
11036	TF	41205				
11038	TF	41203				
11040	TSO	12605				
11041	RFM	10216	TSOB	10414		
11042	TSO	12173	TSOL	12613		
11043	RFM	10223	TSOB	10415		
11044	TSO	12184				
11045	TF	41201				
11046	TSO	12621				
11047	RFM	10219				
11049	RFM	10212				
11050	RFM	10213				
11051	RFM	10217				
11052	TSO	12174	TSO	12617		
11053	RFM	10218				
11054	TSO	12627				
11055	TF	41206				
11056	RFM	10220				
11057	RFM	10227				
11058	TSO	12175	TSO	12619		
11059	RFM	10229				
11060	TF	41193				
11062	RFM	10224				
11063	RFM	10222				
Mk3b
1st Number	Converted to	2nd Number	Converted to	3rd Number	Converted to	4th Number
11064	TSO	12176				
11065	TSO	12177				
11071	TSO	12178				
11083	TSO	12179				
11084	TSO	12180				
11086	TSO	12181				
11089	TSO	12185				

== Mark 4 ==
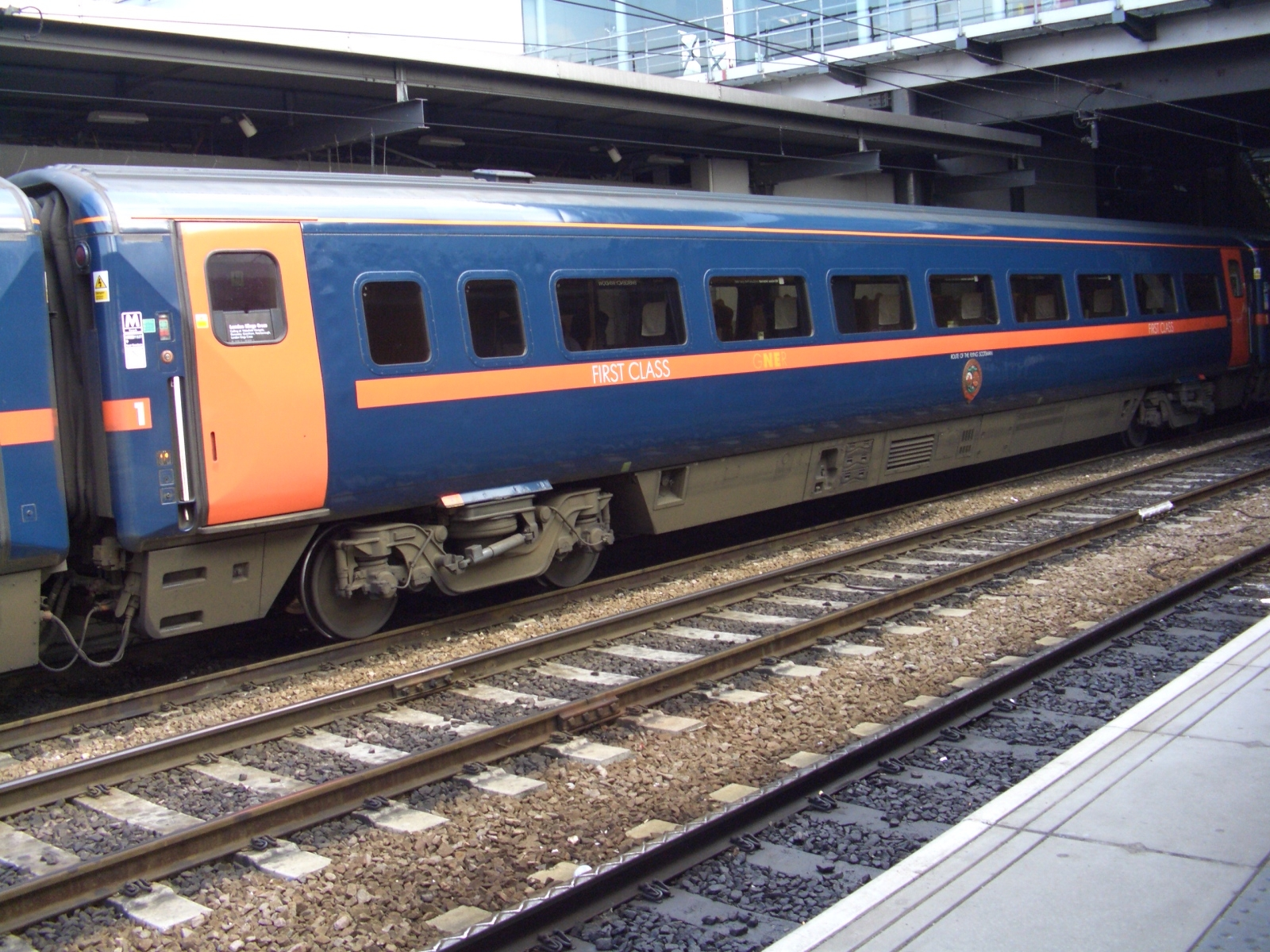
GNER Mark 4 First Open at Leeds in 2006

Built in 1991 and 1992 by Metro-Cammell as the main coaching stock for InterCity 225 sets, Mark 4 coaches were provided from-new with controlled-emission toilets and power-operated plug doors. They are fitted with Swiss-made SIG BT41A bogies and have a design maximum speed of 140 mph (225 km/h), though for operational reasons their normal maximum speed in service is 125 mph (201 km/h).

=== Orders ===
Fleet numbers	Built	Diagram	Builder	Lot No.
11200-11263	1991	AD111	Metro-Cammell Washwood Heath	31046
11272-11276	1992	AD111	Metro-Cammell Washwood Heath	31046

=== Mark 4 FO conversions ===
- From 2003 to 2005, 30 FO coaches were converted to First Open Disabled (FOD) and renumbered 11301 to 11330.
- From 2003 to 2005, 30 FO coaches were converted to First Open Smoking (FOS) and renumbered 11401 to 11430. After smoking became illegal on all train services in Britain the coaches switched back to the FO designation, but kept their new numbers.

Original Number	New Designation	New Number	Original Number	New Designation	New Number
11200	FO	11427	11235	FOD	11323
11202	FO	11404	11236	FOD	11327
11203	FOD	11302	11238	FOD	11315
11204	FO	11405	11239	FO	11424
11205	FO	11406	11240	FO	11411
11206	FOD	11326	11242	FO	11420
11207	FOD	11314	11243	FOD	11329
11208	FO	11415	11245	FOD	11321
11209	FO	11412	11246	FO	11414
11210	FOD	11313	11247	FOD	11319
11211	FOD	11303	11248	FO	11430
11212	FO	11413	11249	FOD	11330
11214	FO	11401	11250	FO	11419
11215	FOD	11301	11251	FOD	11318
11216	FO	11402	11252	FO	11426
11217	FOD	11307	11253	FOD	11324
11218	FO	11408	11254	FO	11416
11220	FO	11421	11255	FOD	11320
11221	FOD	11311	11256	FO	11407
11222	FO	11418	11257	FOD	11304
11223	FOD	11317	11258	FO	11403
11225	FOD	11312	11259	FOD	11309
11226	FO	11417	11260	FO	11410
11227	FOD	11316	11261	FOD	11305
11228	FOD	11322	11262	FO	11409
11230	FO	11423	11263	FOD	11308
11231	FOD	11325	11272	FOD	11310
11232	FO	11422	11274	FOD	11328
11233	FO	11428	11275	FO	11429
11234	FO	11425	11276	FOD	11306

== Notes ==
Coach Type Conversions Abbreviations
CO	Open Composite
FO	First Open
FOD	First Open Disabled
RFM	Restaurant First Modular
SO	Second Open 2+1
TF	Trailer First
TFD	Trailer First Disabled
TS	Trailer Second
TSO	Open Second 2+2
TSOB	Standard Open with Buffet
