= LMS railcars =

The London, Midland and Scottish Railway (LMS) introduced a number of railcars to service between 1927 and 1939. Most were single units but one was a three-car articulated set and one was a four-car set.

== Leyland Single units ==
LMS 29950–29952
- In service: 1933
- Manufacturer: London, Midland and Scottish Railway
- Built at: Leyland Motors
- Constructed: 1933
- Number built: 3
- Number scrapped: All
- Fleet numbers: 29950–29952
- Capacity: 40 third-class
- Operators: London, Midland and Scottish Railway

Specifications
- Weight: 10 long tons (10 t; 11 short tons)
- Prime mover: 95 hp (71 kW) diesel
- Track gauge: 4 ft 8 1/2 in (1,435 mm)

The LMS bought three four-wheeled diesel railcars from Leyland Motors in 1933. These were allocated to LMS diagram D2132, although this may have been after they were delivered, and may have been required when modifications were made. They were numbered 29950–29952 in the multiple unit section of the LMS carriage number series. Each had 40 third class seats arranged 2+2 either side of a central gangway and were powered by a 95 hp (71 kW) diesel engine. After trials between Preston and Carlisle they worked from Blackburn to Spring Vale and Clitheroe and subsequently at Hamilton Central in Lanarkshire. They passed to British Railways when the LMS was nationalised. BR withdrew them in 1951, so they never received TOPS classification.

== Articulated unit ==
LMS 80000–80002
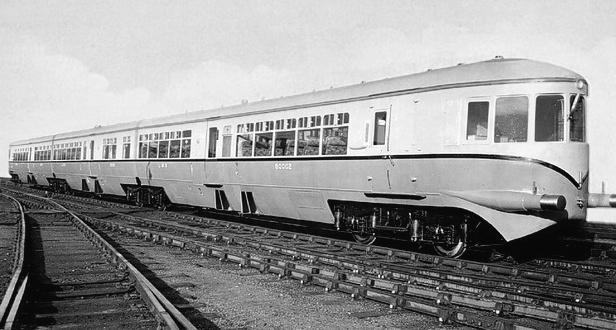
- Railcar 80002 as built in 1938, official photograph.
- In service: 1939
- Manufacturer: London, Midland and Scottish Railway
- Built at: Derby Carriage and Wagon Works
- Constructed: 1938
- Number built: 1 set (3 cars)
- Number scrapped: All
- Fleet numbers: 80000–80002
- Capacity: 24 first-class 138 third-class
- Operators: London, Midland and Scottish Railway
- Depot: Bedford

Specifications
- Train length: 182 ft 0 in (55.47 m)
- Car length: Centre: 52 ft 0 in (15.85 m), Outer: 64 ft 0 in (19.51 m)
- Articulated sections: Three
- Weight: 73 long tons (74 t; 82 short tons)
- Prime mover: Six 125 hp (93 kW) engines (2 per car)
- Power output: 750 hp (559 kW)
- UIC classification: 1A+AA+AA+A1
- Track gauge: 4 ft 8 1/2 in (1,435 mm)

In 1937, the LMS decided to produce a more modern diesel train for itself. This was a three-car articulated railcar built to LMS diagram D1996 and outshopped from Derby Carriage and Wagon Works in 1939. The cars were numbered 80000, 80001 and 80002.

The streamlined three-car train was a single articulated unit; the two outer coaches were each 64 ft (19.51 m) long and rested on a centre coach that was 52 ft (15.85 m) long. The articulation was an idea that had been already taken up by Sir William Stanier for some locomotive hauled stock.

Mechanically, the train was a development of railcars that had entered service from 1933 on the LMS Northern Counties Committee's (NCC) lines in Northern Ireland, using an identical arrangement of in-line powertrain as NCC railcars Nos. 2–4. Under each coach were two vertically mounted Leyland 125 bhp (93 kW) diesel engines driving the inner axle of each bogie through a Lysholm-Smith torque converter. There were six engines for the three-car set which gave a total power of 750 bhp (559 kW). The whole unit weighed 73 long tons, so this yielded a power/weight ratio of slightly more than 10 bhp/ton which provided a main line standard of performance with a maximum speed of 75 mph (121 km/h).

Accommodation in the end cars was split into two saloons with 26 seats in the outer saloon plus a lavatory, and 28 seats in the inner saloon, all seats being reversible and third class. Between the outer saloon and the driving cab was a small luggage and brake compartment. The centre car was a composite with a 30-seat third class saloon with a lavatory, and the other saloon having 24 first-class seats. All of the seats were arranged as 2+2. The cab was generously proportioned with the driver in a central position.

It entered revenue-earning service in 1939 based at Bedford, and worked first on the Varsity Line between Oxford Rewley Road and Cambridge, and then on St Pancras – Nottingham services.

A second unit may have been intended, and the diagram was marked that two units should be constructed although the order was for the one unit that was actually built. 80000–80001–80002 was withdrawn on the outbreak of World War II in 1939, stored, and never re-entered passenger service.

=== Conversion for Overhead line maintenance ===
In 1949, British Railways converted the articulated unit to a two-car set for overhead line maintenance. The centre car was removed and the number of engines in the set reduced to two. The driving cabs were given flat ends. To enable engineering staff to work on the overhead cables the roofs of the two coaches were flattened, creating a work space 130 feet (40 m) long and 5 feet 4 inches (1.63 m) wide. Between the two cars a manually operated lift was installed that could be raised to 6 feet (1.8 m) above roof level.

One coach was converted into a workshop with all passenger seats removed and workbench facilities installed. The other coach was converted into staff accommodation with lockers, cooking, washing facilities and a WC, and 12 seats with tables as a mess saloon. An old 30 feet (9.1 m) coach was converted to carry 2,000 feet (610 m) of overhead wire and attached to the unit as a trailer. Portable floodlights for night work were installed in the two coaches and in the trailer.

The unit worked on the Manchester – Altrincham line. It was moved to Longsight Depot in 1959 and taken out of service shortly afterwards. It still existed in a derelict state as late as 1967.

The design may be seen as a step in the development of post-war British Railways diesel multiple units (DMU) such as the Derby Lightweight units, at least as far the powertrain is concerned.

== Other single units ==
An Armstrong Whitworth diesel-electric railcar operated a luxury 12-seat express service on the LMS for two weeks in 1933 between London and Castle Bromwich near Birmingham in connection with a British Industries Fair. This car, with body work by Cravens which incorporated a kitchen, was powered by a standard Armstrong-Saurer 250 bhp engine.

Between 1936 and 1937, the LMS trialled two experimental railcars built by Armstrong Siddeley to a French design, which had Michelin pneumatic tyres. These were tested on the Leamington to Nuneaton route. Despite proving popular with passengers and crew, no orders happened, and they were withdrawn in 1937.

== Other multiple units ==
In 1927 a four-car electric multiple unit, originally built for a trial of 3.5KV overhead DC electrification on the Bury–Holcombe Brook line, was converted to diesel-electric operation.

== See also ==
- LMS (Northern Counties Committee) railcars
- Railmotor
