= Derby Litchurch Lane Works =

Railway rolling stock factory in Derbyshire, England

Coordinates: 52.906°N 1.459°W

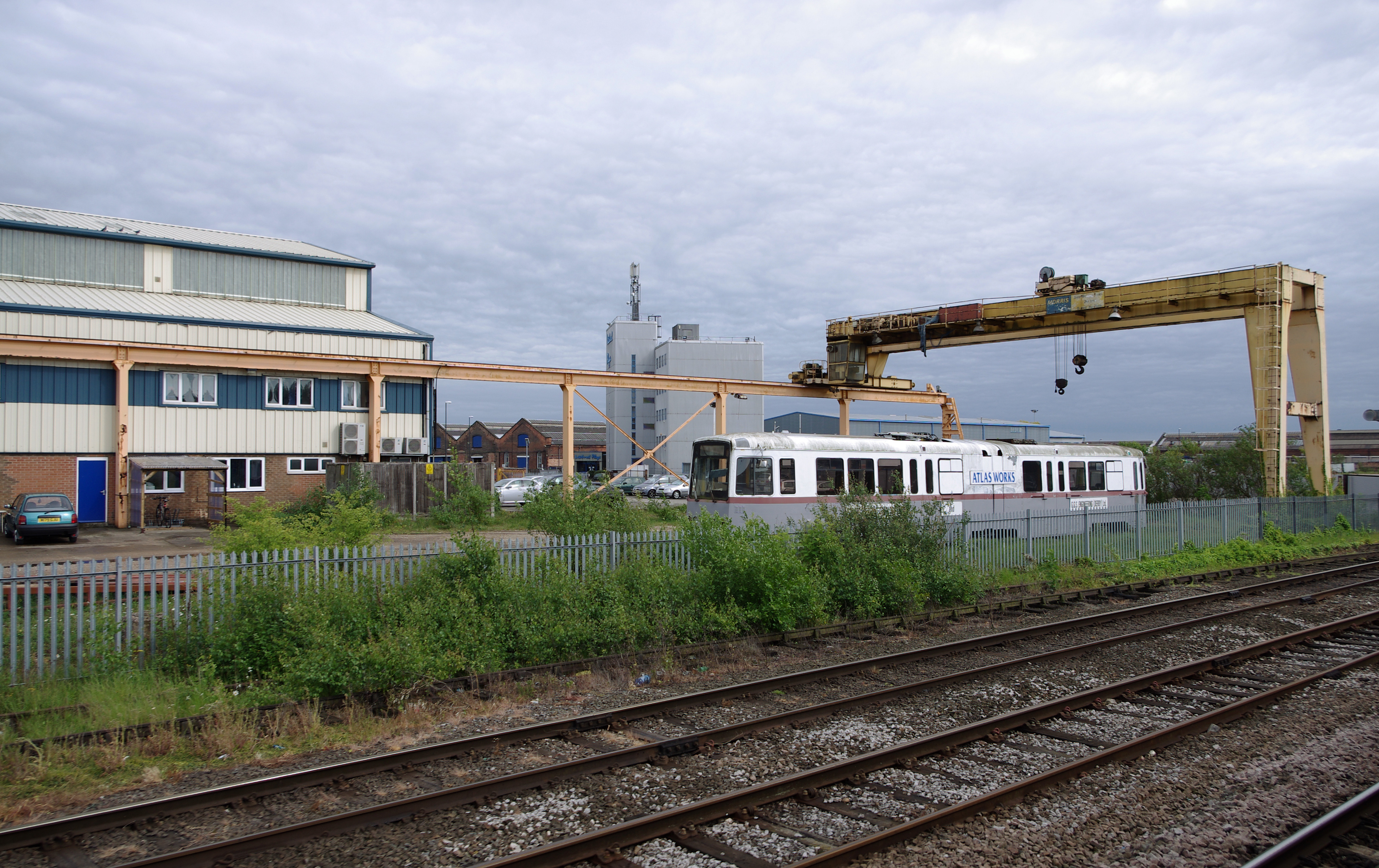
Litchurch Lane works seen from a passing train in 2011. A US Standard Light Rail Vehicle (now scrapped) is visible, which was originally intended for use on the Manchester Metrolink network

Derby Litchurch Lane Works, formerly Derby Carriage and Wagon Works, is a railway rolling stock factory in Derby, Derbyshire, England. It is presently owned by the multinational transportation manufacturer Alstom.

Derby works originally commenced production of rolling stock on behalf of its owner, the Midland Railway, during the mid 1840s as the direction of Matthew Kirtley, the company's first locomotive and carriage superintendent. Due to its expansion, it was split into the Midland Railway Locomotive Works and the newer Carriage and Wagon Works during 1873. In the 1910s, amid the First World War, production techniques at the works were drastically overhauled, greatly reducing the manhours involved in producing carriages amongst other things; the works was also involved in the manufacture of various goods for the British military. During 1923, the Midland Railway, and thus the Derby works, became part of the London, Midland and Scottish Railway.

During the Second World War, the Derby works were involved in manufacturing aircraft sections. Following the creation of British Railways in 1948 and the associated nationalisation of, amongst many other railway-related locations, the Derby works, it became the principal rolling stock works of the London Midland Region of British Railways. On 1 January 1970, the works were transferred to the newly created subsidiary British Rail Engineering Limited (BREL) and renamed Derby Litchurch Lane Works. BREL, and thus the works, was privatised in 1989 and became wholly owned by Asea Brown Boveri (ABB) three years later. During the 1990s, production of the Turbostar DMUs and Electrostar EMUs commenced. During 2001, the works became part of Bombardier Transportation.

After the closure of Alstom's Washwood Heath plant in 2005, Derby works became the only passenger rolling stock manufacturer in the UK. During mid-2011, Bombardier announced it was to cut 1,400 out of the 3,000 jobs at Derby. In November 2019, following the awarding of several big contracts, Bombardier announced the creation of 400 new jobs at the works. In January 2021, Alstom acquired Bombardier Transportation, and thus Derby works. During early 2024, Alstom publicly called on the British government to place orders for a minimum of ten trains in order to prevent 1,300 job losses and a permanent loss of capability at the Derby site. In June, the orders were confirmed. In August 2025, Litchurch Lane hosted The Greatest Gathering exhibition of rolling stock.

== History ==
=== Midland Railway (1876–1923) ===
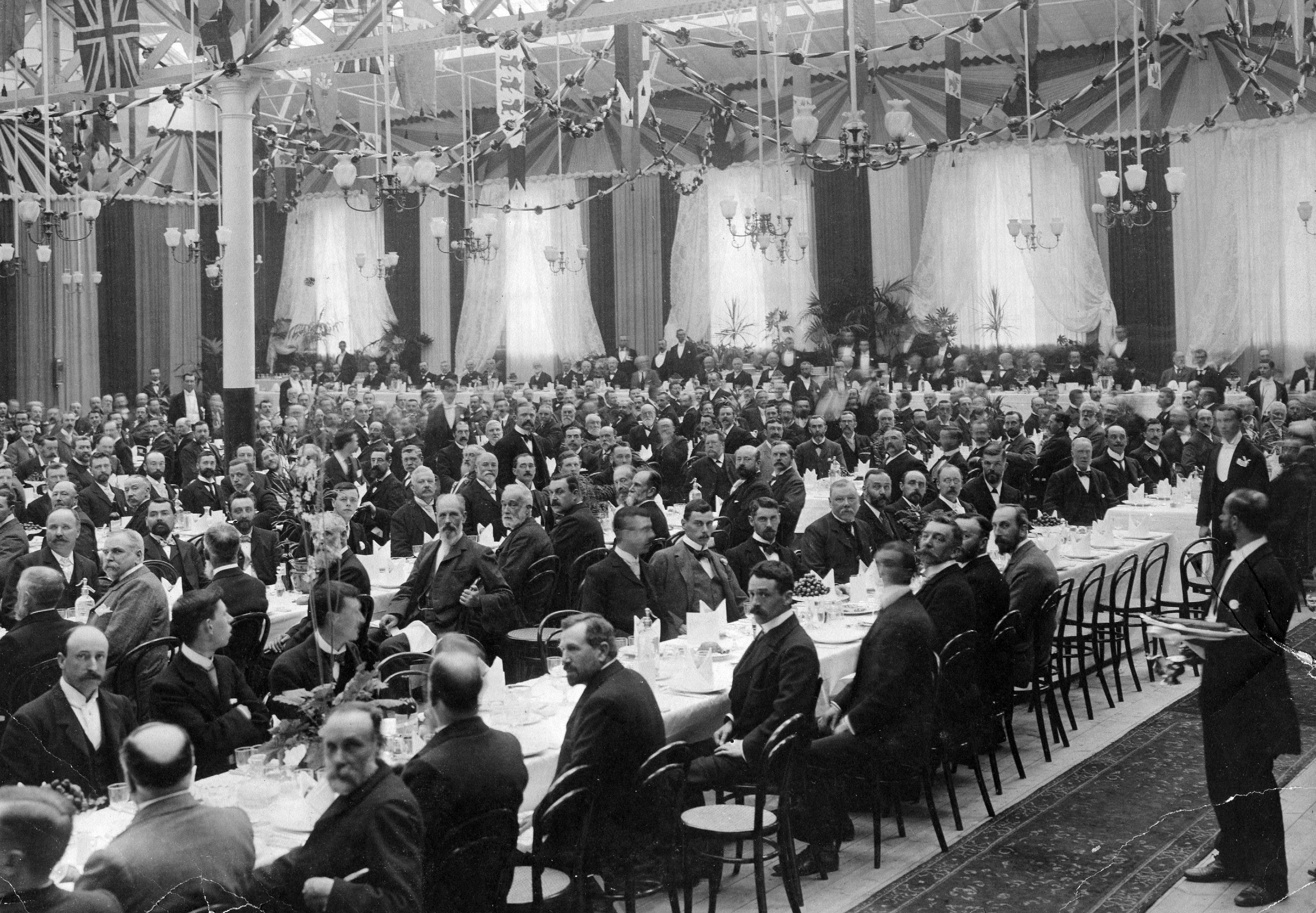
Annual dinner of the Institution of Mechanical Engineers held in the carriage works of the Midland Railway at Derby in 1898. Samuel Johnson, the railway's Chief Mechanical Engineer was the institution president.

Railway building began at Derby Works in 1840, when the North Midland Railway, the Midland Counties Railway and the Birmingham and Derby Railway set up engine sheds as part of their Tri Junct Station. When the three merged in 1844 to form the Midland Railway, its first locomotive and carriage superintendent Matthew Kirtley set out to organise their activities and persuaded the directors to build their own rolling stock, rather than buying it in (see Derby Works).

By the 1860s, the works had expanded to such an extent that he was considering reorganising it and, in 1873, it separated into the Midland Railway Locomotive Works, known locally as "The Loco", and a new Carriage and Wagon Works further south, off Litchurch Lane, locally known as the "Carriage and Wagon". This was completed by his successor Samuel Waite Johnson, under the control of Thomas Gethin Clayton The Derby Carriage and Wagon works were built in 1876.

The carriages of the time were generally less than 50 feet (15 m) long but, possibly because the Midland had just taken delivery of its first Pullman car 56 feet 5 inches (17.20 m) long, Clayton had the foresight to design the works to deal with vehicles up to 70 feet (21 m). This meant, for instance, that the traversers at the end of each shed were still in use a century later.

Production had begun in 1873, at the original loco works, of carriages from kits supplied by the Pullman Company of Detroit, United States. These were followed by Clayton's own design of 54-foot-long (16 m) coaches, which incorporated both first- and third-class accommodation, and ran on four- or six-wheeled bogies. Initially claret or dark red, with dark green locomotives, the livery of both was changed to the well-known crimson in 1883. Five layers of undercoat were used, followed by a top coat and three coats of varnish.

During 1879, the first bogie coaches were built for the Midland's line to Glasgow over its newly opened Settle-Carlisle line. Clayton's successor in 1903 was David Bain, by which time the works was building sleeping cars and dining coaches as well. In 1904, two steam motor-carriages were fitted out for the Morecambe-Heysham service.

Ten- and twelve-ton wagons were produced in quantity, starting with a set of components in the morning, each would be assembled for painting by the end of the day. W. R. Reid and E. J. H. Lemon studied American mass production methods and introduced them around 1919, raising output to 200 wagons and ten coaches per week. The sawmill was recognised as the most modern and largest in Europe, with over 2,000 miles (3,200 km) of timber being seasoned, of nearly 60 different varieties, from pine to lignum vitae.

During 1914, following the outbreak of the First World War, the works was rapidly reoriented towards the productions of various goods for the British armed forces. Specifically, the site manufactured ambulance trains and army wagons along with miscellaneous components for rifles.

=== London, Midland and Scottish Railway (1923-1948) ===
In 1923, the Midland Railway became part of the London, Midland and Scottish Railway, and W. R. Reid was appointed carriage & wagon superintendent. Together with the LNWR's Wolverton works, new coaches were built to the Midland design, corridor coaches with doors to each compartment - the so-called "all-doors". These were still in use until nearly 1960, particularly on the Liverpool and Newcastle to Bristol expresses.

Around 1929, the compartment doors, however, were replaced by two fixed lights, and later with single large windows while all-wood construction gave way to steel panels. In the next decade, the Works' superintendent, Ernest Pugson, realised the potential of the new technology of metallic arc welding, replacing many forged and cast components; at his direction, the first composite welded steel/timber bodies with standardised jig-built components was introduced. The first open carriages, referred to as "vestibule coaches", also appeared around this time. From 1933, roofs were of steel rather than wood, with a simplified livery and a smoother external appearance, and, by the end of the 1930s, all-welded steel vehicles were built for the Liverpool and Southport electric service, the Class 502.

During the Second World War, the Derby works introduced pioneering production techniques for building aeroplane wings; by 1945, the works had produced over 4,000 such wings. With the loco works, wings and fuselages were repaired and sent to a private contractor at Nottingham for assembly, initially of Hampden bombers but later of other aircraft including Lancasters.

Although towards the end of the 1930s, a complete Coronation Scot train was built for an exhibition tour in America and a streamlined all-welded three coach railcar, most of the all-steel carriages were made by outside manufacturers. After the conflict, the LMS began to produce its own, the so-called "porthole" stock with round windows to the lavatory compartment. After nationalisation in 1948, as the main carriage works of the London Midland Region, the first Mk I all-steel carriages were produced.

=== British Railways and BREL (1948–1989) ===
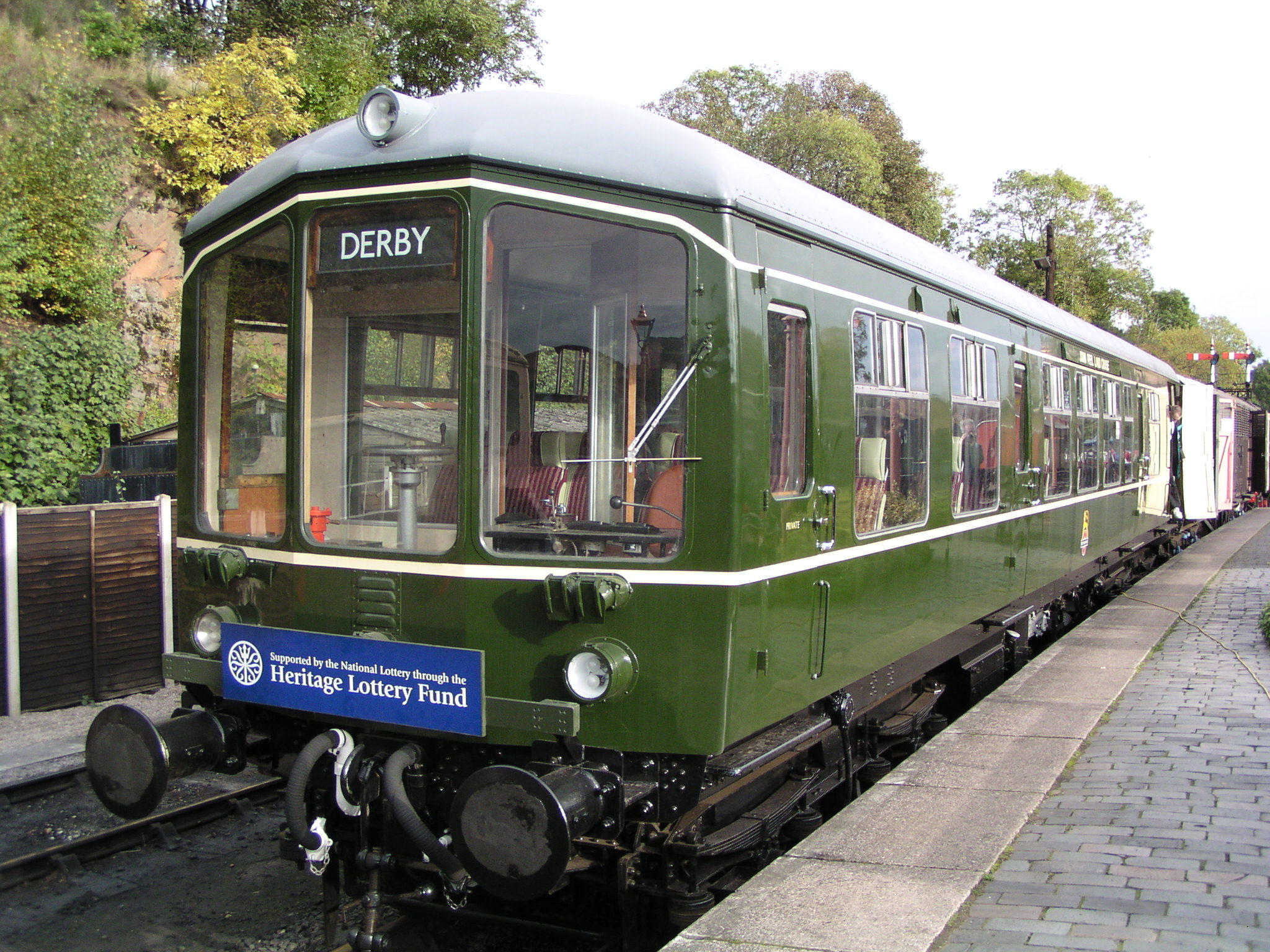
Preserved Derby Lightweight at Bewdley

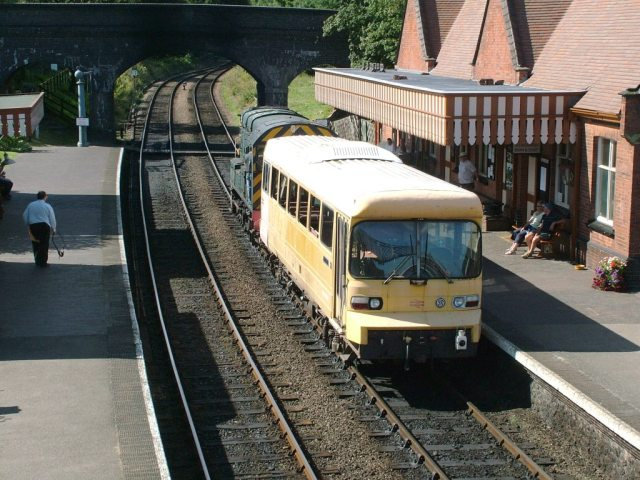
The prototype railbus LEV1

The works became the principal rolling stock works of the London Midland Region of British Railways at nationalisation in 1948; the steel British Railways Mark 1 carriage was developed in the 1950s, and at the beginning of the 1950s the works employed over 5,000 people.

In 1953, the works began production of Derby Lightweight DMUs; units of aluminium construction. The use of glass fibre laminate was introduced for the roof ends.

Trailer cars were also built for the London Transport Executive as replacements on the London Underground's Piccadilly line. In 1956, all-steel DMUs, the Derby Heavyweights were introduced, with over a thousand being built in that decade.

From 1958, the new Class 108 of Derby Lightweights was produced in quantity. A number of steel-bodied Class 107 DMUs were built in 1960 for lines in Scotland.

On 1 January 1970, the works were transferred to the newly created subsidiary British Rail Engineering Limited (BREL) and renamed Derby Litchurch Lane Works. Wagon building and repairs ended following a major re-organisation of the carriage and railcar work; during 1979, container production was ended permanently.

In 1984, British Rail was under extreme financial pressure to close branch lines. At the same time a worldwide need was seen for a low-cost rail vehicle. The Research Division and British Leyland together produced a lightweight four-wheeled vehicle which they referred to as LEV-1. After proving trials, which included assessment on the Boston and Maine Railroad in America, it was developed into the Class 140 which led to a series of two-car Pacer units, and around 150 of various classes were built.

=== Post-privatisation (1989–present) ===
==== BREL (1989–1992), ABB (1992–1996), Adtranz (1996–2001) ====
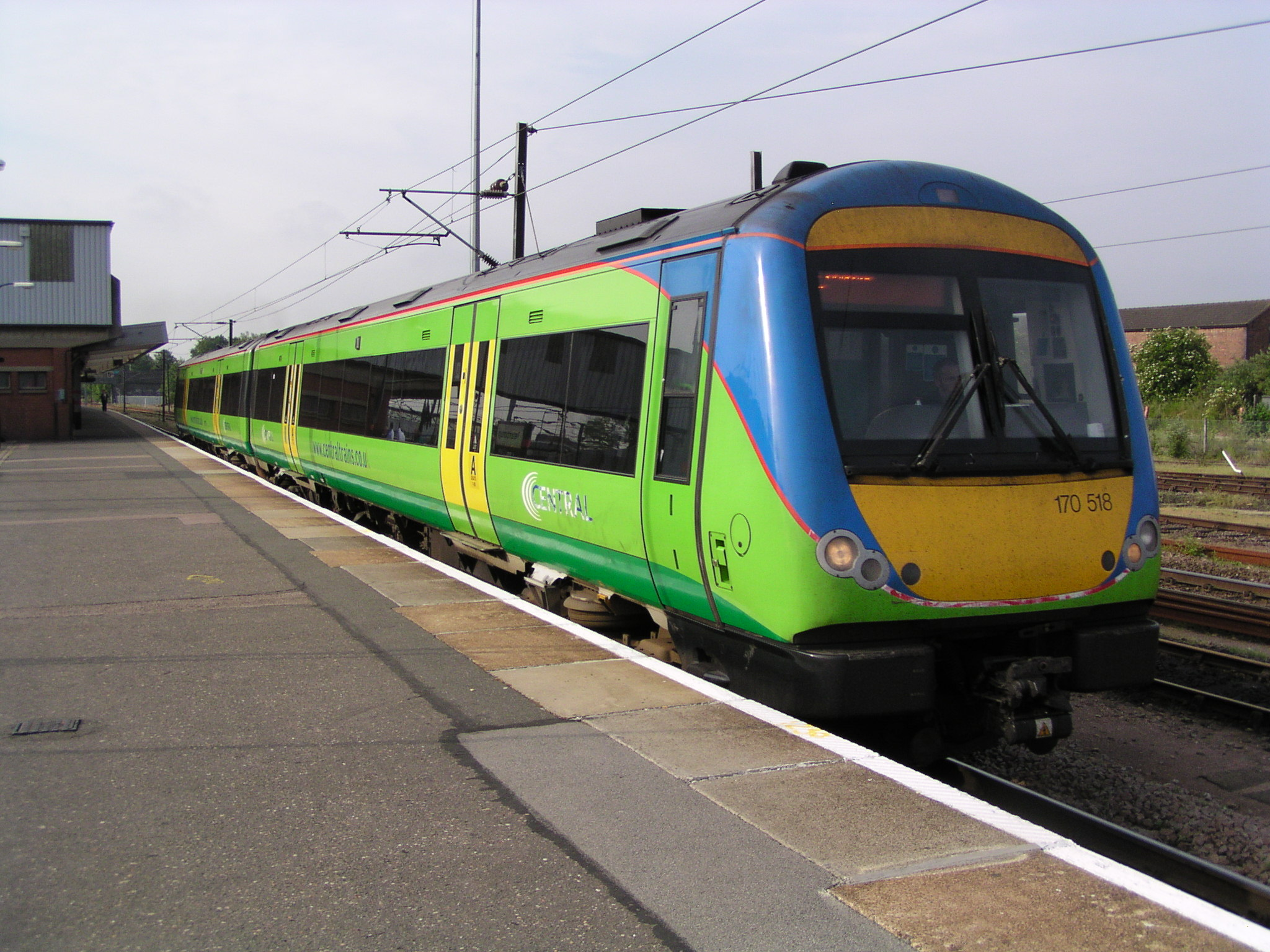
Class 170 Turbostar at Peterborough

BREL was privatised in 1989; the Class 158 also started being built at the works. BREL became wholly owned by ABB in 1992, with the works later becoming part of Adtranz in 1996.

One of the first orders in 1993 was for Class 482 electric multiple units (EMUs) for the Waterloo and City Line. During 1995, a number of Class 325 parcels EMUs were also built at Derby. However, this period was characterised by large contracts and rushes of work, interspersed with periods of relative idleness and layoffs. The works kept going by refurbishing ex-Southern Region slam-door stock.

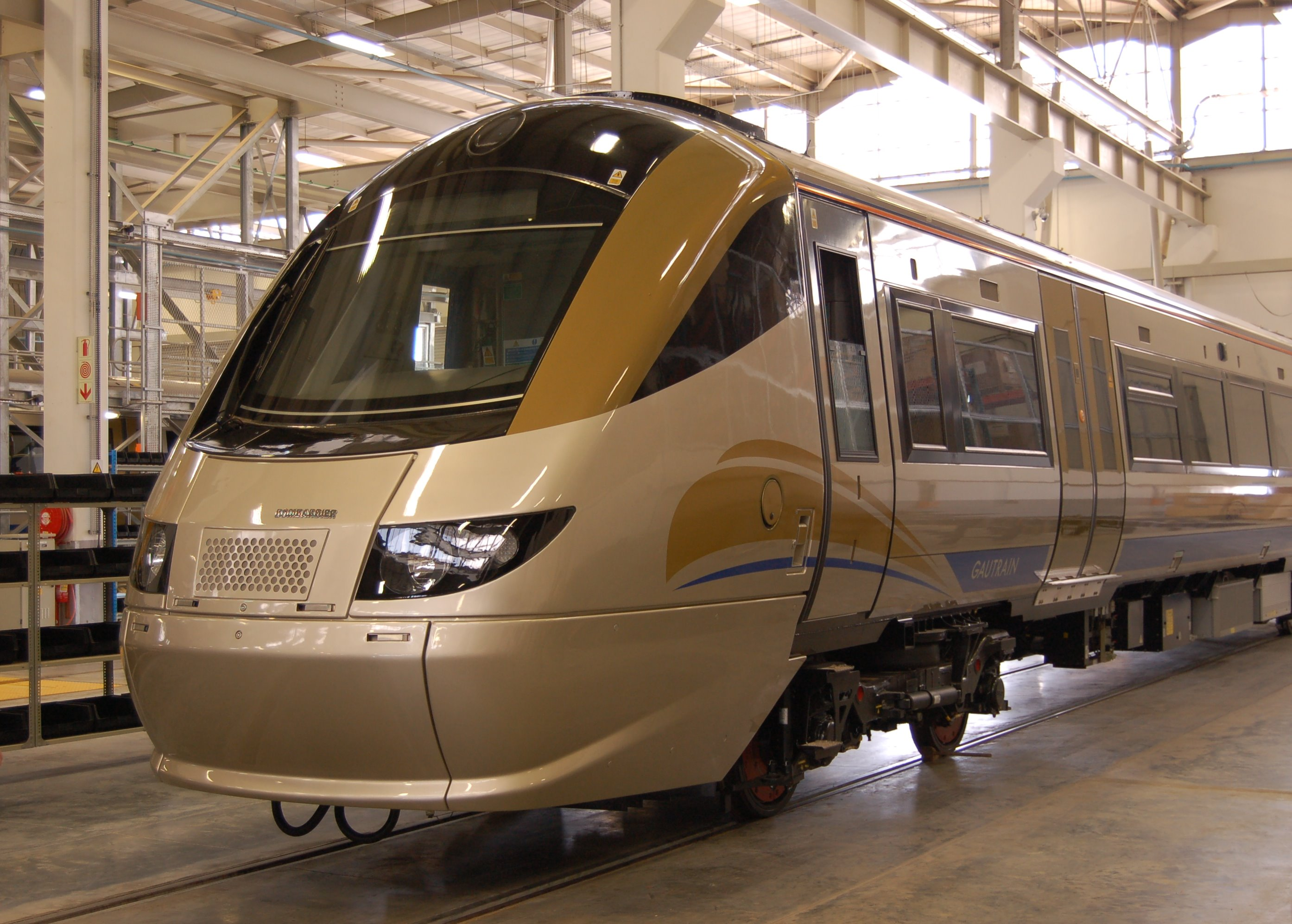
Gautrain EMU in South Africa

In 1997, a contract was received from Chiltern Railways to supply the new Class 168 Clubman DMU. These were the first of over 200 Turbostar DMUs built at the works between 1997 and 2012.

In 1997, a contract was received from Prism Rail to supply 44 Class 357 Electrostar EMU. These were the first of over 640 Electrostar EMU trainsets built at the works between 1999 and 2017, making them the most numerous type of EMU built in the post-privatisation period of Britain's railways.

==== Bombardier (2001–2021) ====
During 2001, the works became part of Bombardier Transportation, following the corporation's purchase of Adtranz.

In 2004, the plant was retained as part of Bombardier's manufacturing capacity in Europe after restructuring by the company led to closure of seven of its European facilities. (Note: Plants closed in the UK included a Derby Pride Park (bogies), Doncaster (maintenance), and Bombardier Prorail, Wakefield (refurbishment).) The site had previously considered a possibility for closure, and had an order gap between the end of the Electrostar contract (for train operators SouthCentral and Southeastern) until 2008 when a major £3.4 billion contract of over 1,700 carriages for Metronet was to begin. The order gap was bridged by an order for Electrostars for the Gautrain project in South Africa won in 2006; the first 15 vehicles were delivered complete, and the remaining 81 in kit form for assembly at Union Carriage & Wagon's plant in Nigel, South Africa.

After the closure of Alstom's Washwood Heath plant in 2005, Bombardier's Derby plant was the only passenger rolling stock manufacturer in the UK. Around this time, there was a nationwide drought in rolling stock orders, raising questions for the future of British train manufacturing.

In early 2009, Bombardier received a contract to build thirty Class 379 EMUs for National Express services including Stansted Express. By mid-2011, Derby had completed construction of EMUs for the 2009 Stock and Class 379 EMUs and was completing an order of Class 172 Turbostar DMUs. The plant had a large order of 192 S Stock trains for London Underground which was completed in 2017.

During 2011, Bombardier was expecting to lay off approximately 1,200 workers at the plant, irrespective of future orders, and the contract for the Thameslink Programme was seen by Bombardier's management as critical to the continued viability of the plant and related supply chain. After Siemens was named preferred bidder in June 2011 to construct the new rolling stock for Thameslink services through London, Bombardier announced it was to cut 1,400 out of the 3,000 jobs at Derby. Colin Walton, chairman of Bombardier Transportation in the UK, said the loss of the contract had forced the company to review its UK operations.

On 28 December 2011, Bombardier won a £188 million contract to produce 130 carriages for Southern. By February 2012, the plant had reduced its workforce to approximately 1,600; however, three years later, the future of the works was secured after securing orders for both the Gatwick Express and Crossrail. In November 2019, Bombardier announced the creation of 400 new jobs at the plant for the production of hundreds of Aventra vehicles for Greater Anglia, South Western Railway and West Midlands Trains.

==== Alstom (2021–present) ====
In January 2021, Alstom acquired Bombardier Transportation in exchange for €5.1 billion; accordingly, it took over operations of the Derby site and its rolling stock designs, such as the Aventra and Electrostar.

In December 2021, Alstom, in joint venture with Hitachi, successfully gained a landmark contract to build the High Speed Two Phase One Class 895 rolling stock, capable of 225 mph (362 km/h). The end stage of the rolling stock will be done at Derby and Alstom's Crewe works with the first stage of production being done at the Hitachi Newton Aycliffe facility; questions over the future of this order have been raised.

During early 2024, Alstom publicly called on the British government to place orders for a minimum of ten trains in order to prevent 1,300 job losses and a permanent loss of capability at the Derby site. In June, Alstom announced they had been given the go-ahead to build the new trains, with a contract for maintenance of them until 2046. The option for voluntary redundancies however still remain.

=== The Greatest Gathering (2025) ===
2025 marked the 200th anniversary since the opening of the Stockton and Darlington Railway in 1825 & 200 years in the history of rail transport. To mark the 200th anniversary an event called The Greatest Gathering was to take place. The Greatest Gathering was an exhibition of railway vehicles to be hosted at Derby Litchurch Lane Works from Friday 1 to Sunday 3 August 2025. It was the world's largest-ever gathering of historic and modern rolling stock.

The event marked 200 years in the history of rail transport since the construction of Locomotion No. 1 and hauling of the world's first passenger train along the Stockton and Darlington Railway on 27 September 1825.

Minister of State for Transport, Lord Peter Hendy stated that The Greatest Gathering "promises to enter the history books as the largest exhibition of railway equipment ever staged in the UK."

==== Exhibits ====
The original plan had been for 30 to 50 exhibits and 5,000 visitors. During 1–3 August 2025 there were 40,000 visitors, and over 140 railway vehicles and railway locomotives on display covering two centuries. Locomotives included heritage steam locomotives alongside heritage diesel and electric locomotives plus units to modern locomotives including electric multiple units.

== See also ==
- LMS railcars
- Listed buildings in Alvaston
