= British Rail Mark 1 =

Railway coaching stock

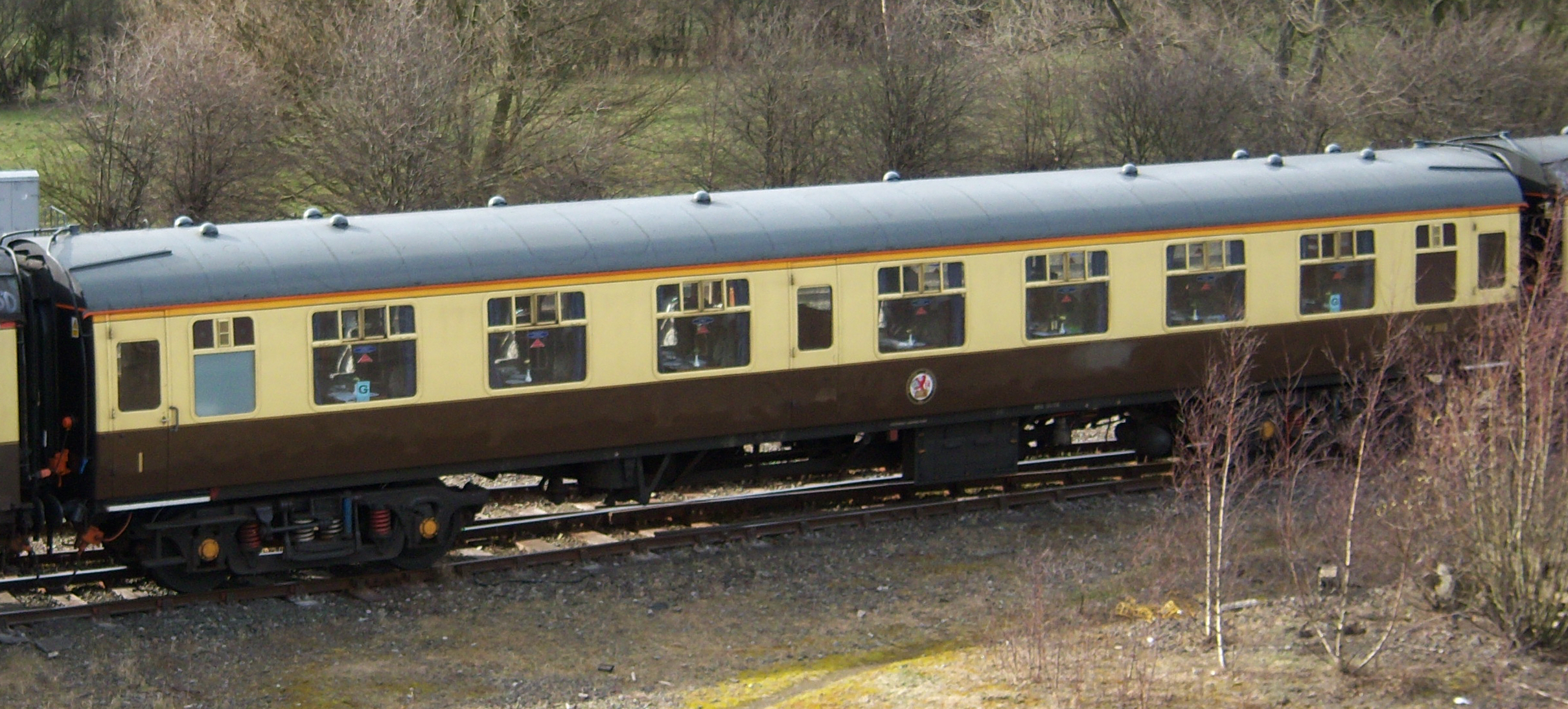
- Mark 1 Open First on Commonwealth bogies at Tyne Yard in March 2009

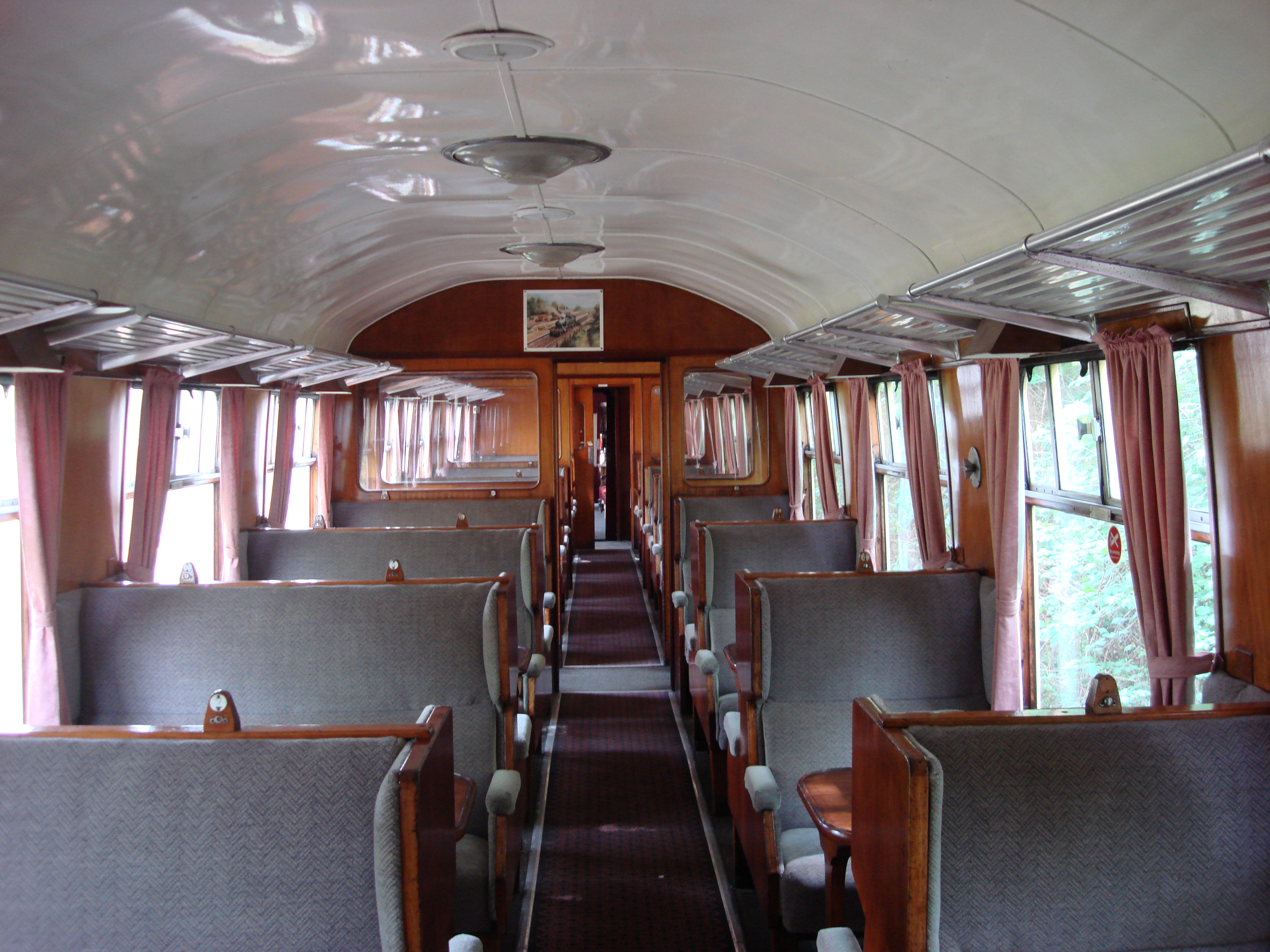
- Interior of a Mark 1 SO (Second Open) Colne Valley Railway
- In service: 1951–present
- Manufacturers: British Railways; Cravens; Gloucester Railway Carriage & Wagon Company
- Built at: Derby; Doncaster; Eastleigh; Swindon; Wolverton; York
- Constructed: 1951–1963
- Operator: British Railways

Specifications
- Car body construction: Steel; Body-on-frame, non-integral
- Car length: 57 ft 0 in (17.37 m) or 63 ft 6 in (19.35 m)
- Doors: Slam
- Maximum speed: 90 or 100 mph 140 or 160 km/h
- HVAC: Steam or electric or both
- Bogies: BR1, BR2, Commonwealth or B4
- Braking systems: automatic vacuum, air, or dual
- Coupling system: Drawhook or retractable knuckle coupler resting on drawhook
- Track gauge: 4 ft 8 1/2 in (1,435 mm) standard gauge

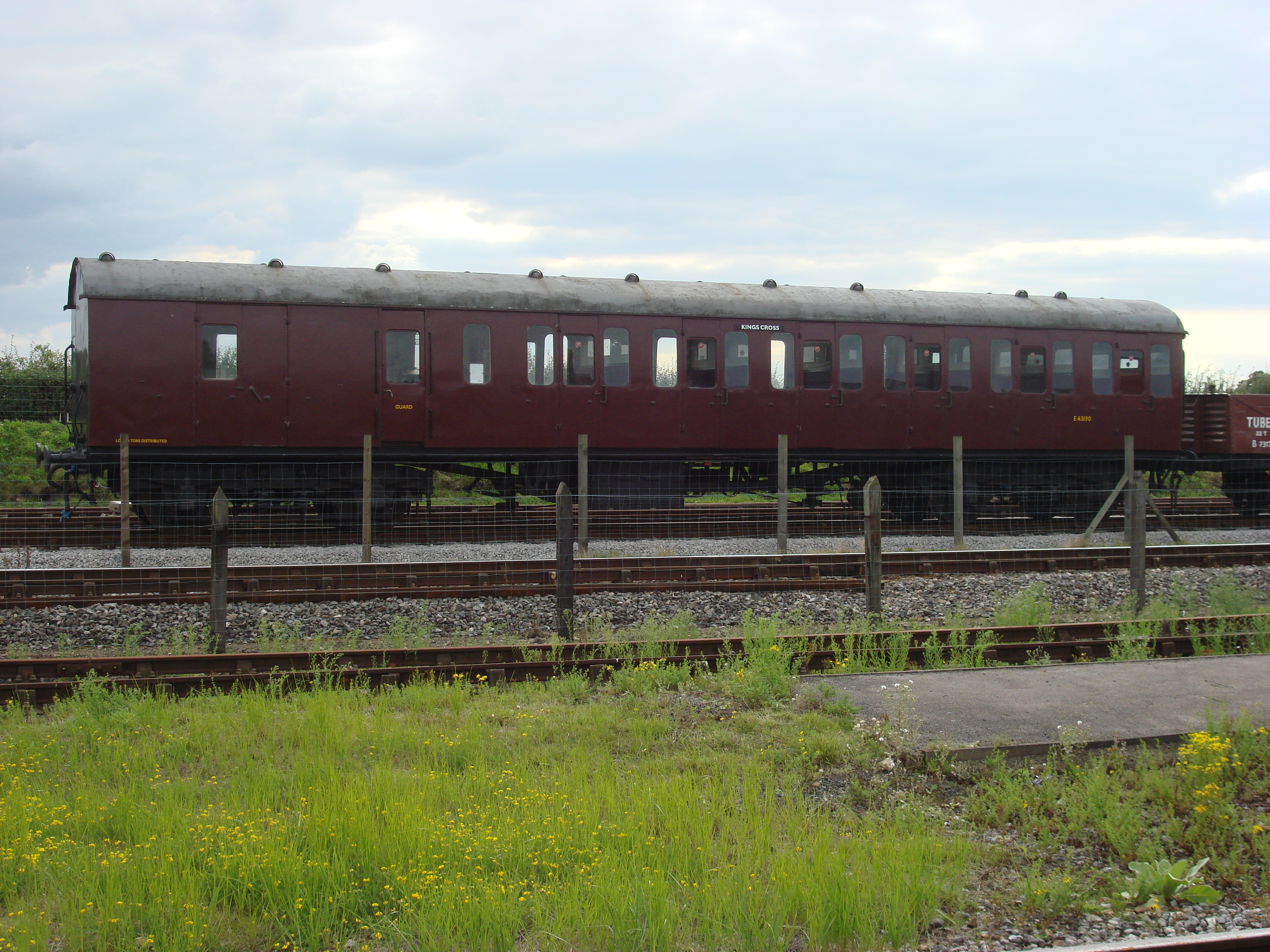
Mark 1 Brake Suburban E43190 at the Buckinghamshire Railway Centre This type was shorter than standard and has no corridor

British Rail Mark 1 is the family designation for the first standardised designs of railway carriages built by British Railways (BR) from 1951 until 1974, now used only for charter services on the main lines or on preserved railways.

Following nationalisation in 1948, BR had continued to build carriages to the designs of the "Big Four" companies (the Great Western, Southern, London, Midland and Scottish and London and North Eastern railways), and the Mark 1 was intended to be the standard carriage design for use across all lines, incorporating the best features of each of the former companies' designs. It was also designed to be much stronger than previous designs, to provide better protection for passengers in the event of a collision or derailment.

The Mark 1 coaches were built in two distinct tranches: the early vehicles (1951–1960) and, from 1961 onwards, the "Commonwealth" stock – so named on account of their bogies, which were a variant of the bogie designed by the General Steel Castings Corporation (formerly named the Commonwealth Steel Company) of Granite City, United States of America.

== Construction ==
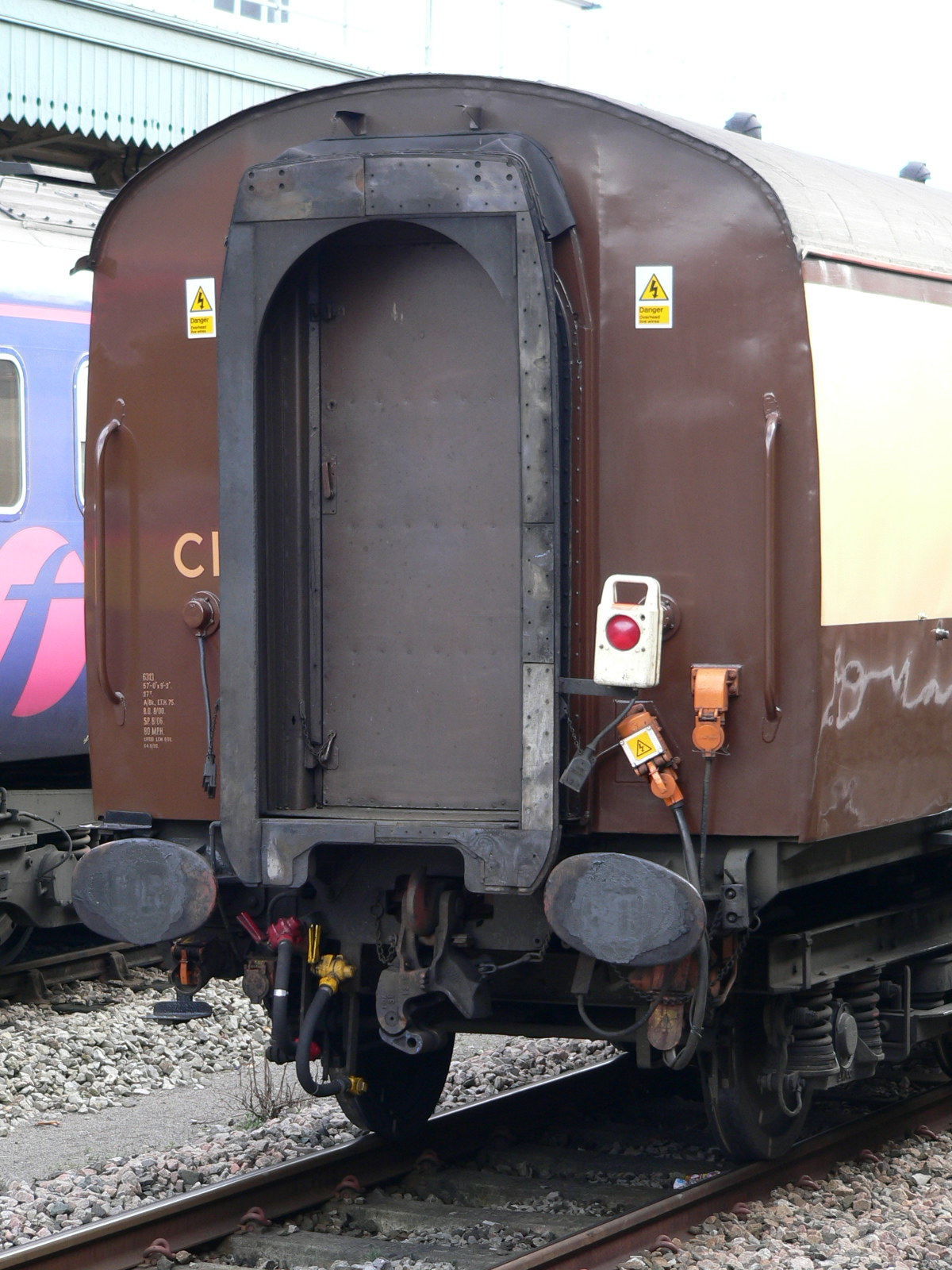
Mark 1 coach fitted with a British-style dual buffer-and-chain/janney coupler with knuckle swung out of the way

The design was used for hauled passenger stock, multiple unit carriages and non-passenger carrying stock. For passenger stock, construction continued from 1951 to 1963, while multiple units and non-passenger carrying stock continued to be built until 1974. Developed by Derby Carriage & Wagon Works, they were built at Derby, Doncaster, Eastleigh, Swindon, Wolverton and York works.

These were constructed in two lengths. Most had underframes 63 ft 5 in (19.33 m) long, with bogies at 46 ft 6 in (14.17 m) centres; the body was 64 ft 6 in (19.7 m) long if the coach was gangwayed, or 63 ft 5 3/4 in (19.35 m) if non-gangwayed. A smaller number had underframes 56 ft 11 in (17.3 m) long, with bogies at 40 ft (12.2 m) centres; the body was 58 ft (17.7 m) long if the carriage was gangwayed, or 57 ft 1 3/4 in (17.4 m) if non-gangwayed.

A device known as a tell-tale connects the emergency (communication) cord or chain to the train line to facilitate an emergency stop.

== 1957 prototypes ==
In 1957, twelve carriages were built (four by Doncaster Works and two each by four outside contractors) in an attempt to improve on the existing design.

== Fibreglass bodied vehicles ==
In 1962, Eastleigh Works constructed a single fibreglass bodied Mark 1. The vehicle, numbered S1000S, was mounted on the underframe of Mark 1 Tourist Second Open S4378, which was written off as a result of the Lewisham rail crash in 1957. Only the one example was built due to the cost, making this the only fibreglass-bodied passenger carriage built by British Railways. S1000S was used on the Hayling Island Branch Line until closure in 1963. After use as a generator van at Lancing Carriage Works, it re-entered capital stock. Its final duties were on commuter trains between Clapham Junction and Kensington Olympia. After withdrawal, it was stored at Micheldever. It was purchased in 1973 by the East Somerset Railway. In 2010, the carriage was restored, and as of January 2011 is in service on the East Somerset Railway. Repainted into maroon when work carried out in 2016.

A single van, no. E85000, also had fibreglass body panels. This was converted from a normal passenger carriage (Mark 1 Corridor Composite no. Sc15170) at Derby Carriage & Wagon Works in 1970 to carry parcels conveyed in BRUTE trolleys; it was used until 1982. It weighed 27 long tons (27.4 t; 30.2 short tons), even though it was 6 feet 6 inches (1.98 m) longer than a normal parcels van weighing 30 long tons (30.5 t; 33.6 short tons).

== XP64 ==
Near the end of the production of hauled Mark 1 stock came a series of eight experimental carriages known as the XP64 set. Three Corridor Firsts, two Corridor Seconds, and three Tourist Second Opens were built by Derby Carriage & Wagon Works in 1964. Externally they resembled Mark 1 stock with the addition of a cosmetic cover over the solebars of the standard Mark 1 underframes, but inside they included many new features, including pressure ventilation, new seating designs and wider bi-fold doors.

== Safety ==
The 1988 Clapham Junction rail accident highlighted that by the 1980s the Mark 1 coach was dated, and less able to withstand collisions than newer designs. Nevertheless, the Hidden Report into the disaster concluded that withdrawal of Mark 1 units was impractical and the design was not inherently unsafe: "The inventory of Mark I coaching stock is large, and much of it has not reached an end of economic life, nor will do so for another decade or more. Mark I vehicles have good riding qualities, and are not intrinsically lacking in collision resistance."

During the late 1990s Mark 1 stock began to reach the end of its design life and concerns about its safety relative to newer rolling stock became more pressing. The Health and Safety Executive issued instructions in 1999 per the Railway Safety Regulations 1999 to withdraw all Mark 1 carriages and multiple units based on that design by the end of 2002 unless rebodied or modified to reduce the potential for overriding in the event of a collision. A proposed modification to extend mainline use beyond 2002 at the time of the 1999 HSE instruction was 'cup and cone', however trials were inconclusive and deemed expensive in comparison with the safety benefits. In October 2002 the Health and Safety Executive extended the permitted use of Mark 1 based rolling stock until 31 December 2004 with the proviso they be fitted with a Train Protection & Warning System.

== Post-privatisation ==
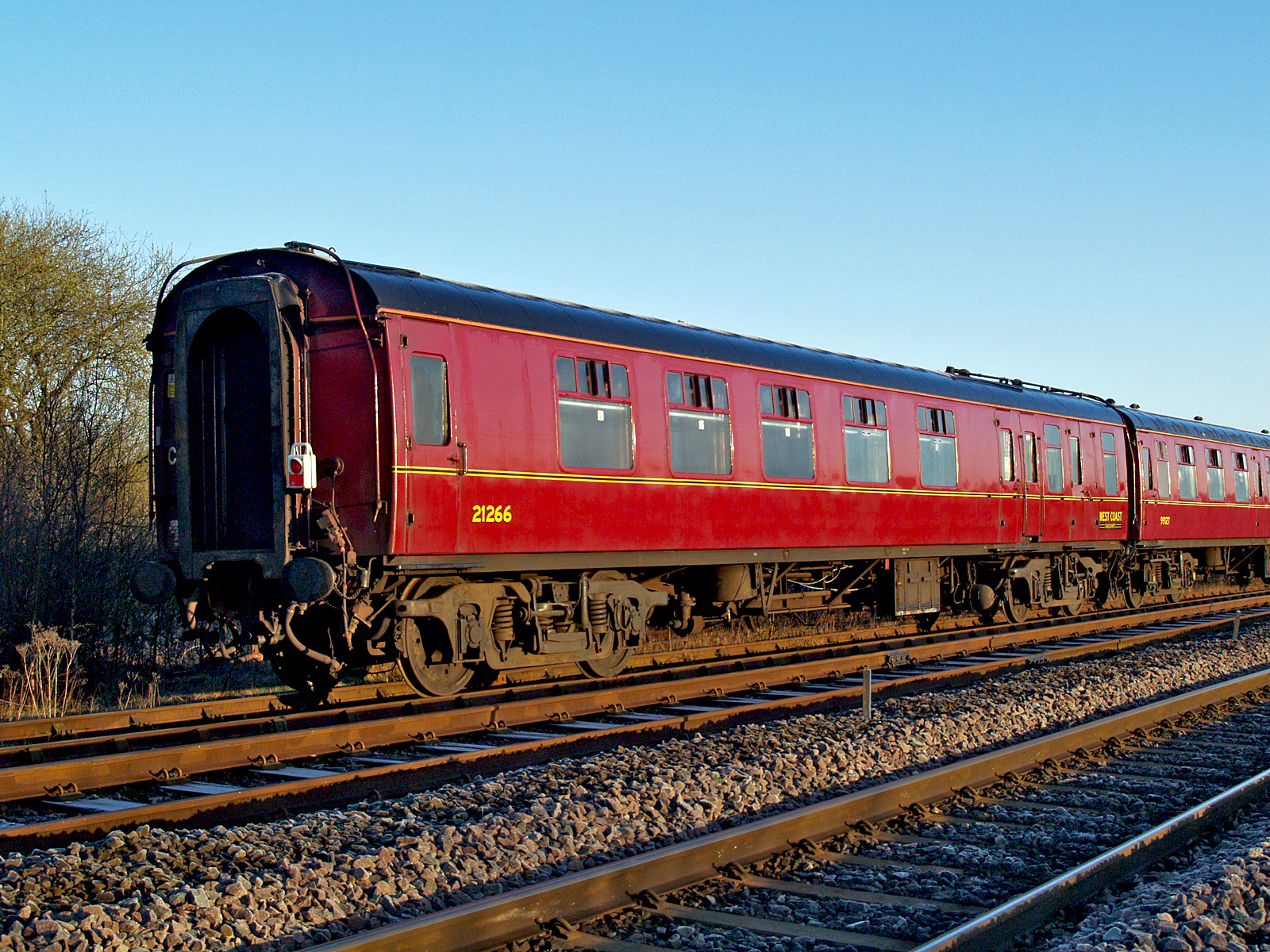
A West Coast Railways' Mark 1 diagram AB302 corridor brake composite coach number 21266 at Castleton East Junction with Mark 1 diagram AD103 open first coach number 99127 behind, March 2009

The last of ScotRail's Mark 1 based Class 303 multiple units survived until December 2002.

Network Rail continue to use converted Mark 1 coaches for various departmental duties – test trains, sandite units, and accommodation units for worksite personnel are some examples.

The final withdrawal of Mark 1s from daily mainline use was in 2005, some 54 years since the design entered service. South West Trains was granted a derogation to continue to operating two three-car 421s on the Lymington branch line until 2010.

Due to the lack of central door locking and Mark 1 stock not meeting the latest rolling stock safety expectations, various rules now govern their usage. In particular vehicles lacking central door locking require a steward to be present in each vehicle. Train companies are also recommended to run Mark 1 stock with more robust non-Mark 1 stock at either end to act as a barrier in the case of collisions. Mark 1s continue to be used on special charter trains with charter operators including North Yorkshire Moors Railway, Riviera Trains, Vintage Trains and West Coast Railways. The Office of Rail & Road has granted these operators an exemption to the Railway Safety Regulations 1999 to continue to operate Mark 1s on the main line until 2023.

== Preservation ==
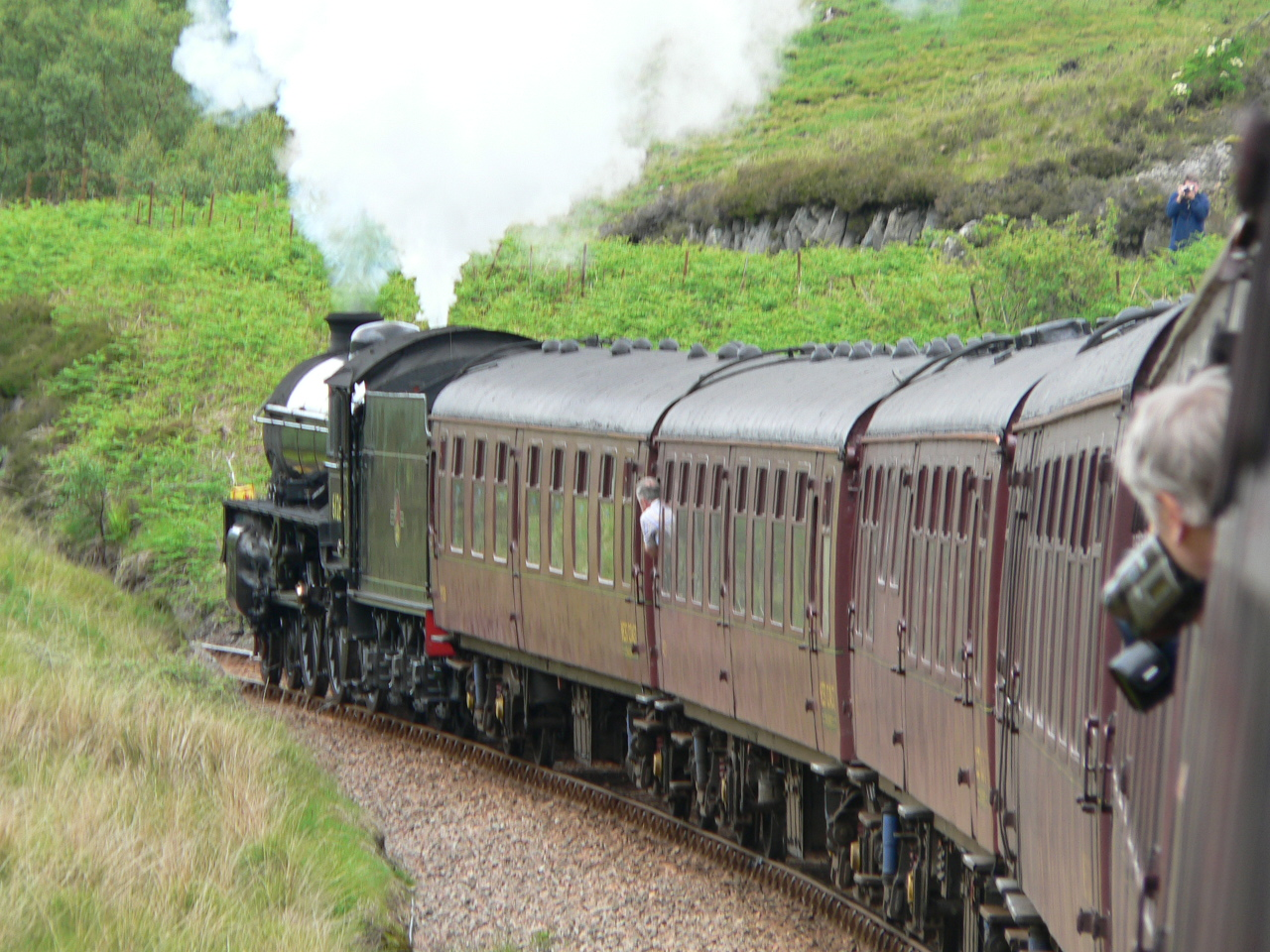
Mark 1 carriages on The Jacobite en route to Mallaig in 2005

=== Sleepers ===
Number	Type	Location	Notes
2080	Sleeper First	Peak Rail	Being restored
2108	Sleeper First	Carnforth	Bad condition
2127	Sleeper First	Carnforth	Bad condition
2131	Sleeper First	Carnforth	Bad condition
2132	Sleeper First	Llangollen Railway	Used as volunteer accommodation
2500	Sleeper Second	Carnforth	Bad condition

== See also ==
- Mainline steam trains in Great Britain
- Rolling stock of the Watercress Line – User of Mark 1 coaches for preservation/heritage railway
- Taunton sleeping car fire
