= List of products of the Gloucester Railway Carriage and Wagon Company =

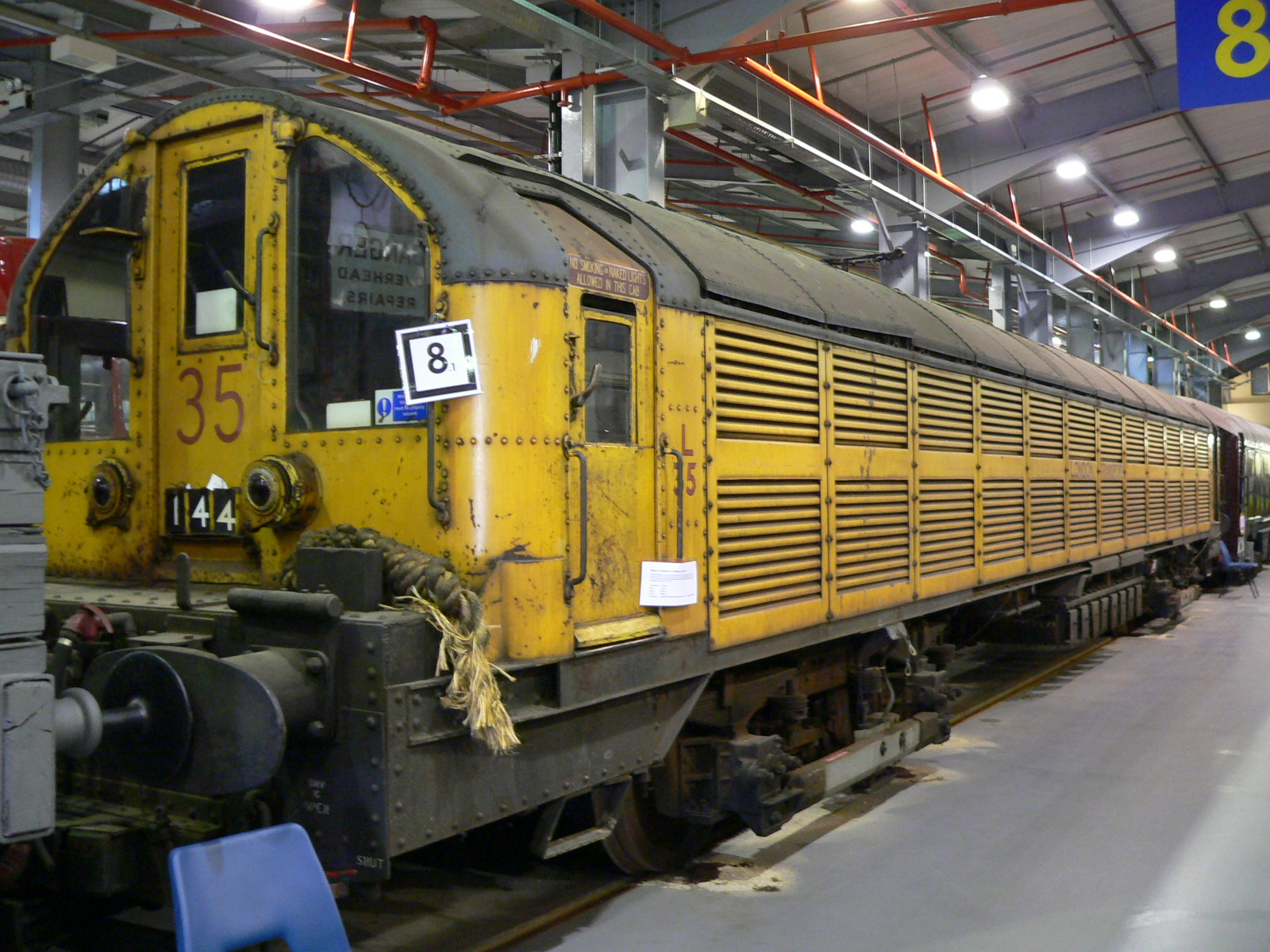
L35, a battery-electric locomotive for the London Underground built in 1938.

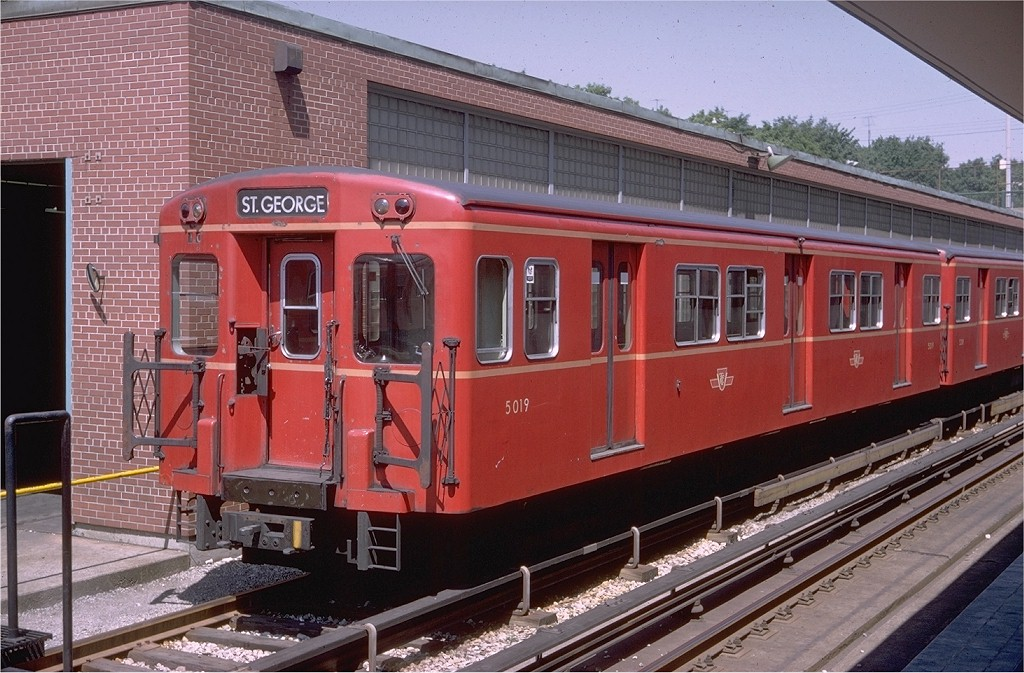
A Gloucester (G-series) subway car that operated in Toronto, Ontario, Canada

This is a partial list of products manufactured by the Gloucester Railway Carriage and Wagon Company:

== Goods wagons ==
- Goods all-iron wagons 1862
- Covered goods wagon (Assam Bengal Railway), 1902
- Four wheel cattle wagon (Ceylon Government Railway), 1912
- L-types cement wagons 1950s
- Pressure Discharge Bulk Powder Wagon ("Presflo") 1955–1963
- "Twin-Tub" Prestwin Silo wagons 1960–1962
- Cemflo Cement tanker wagon

== Passenger coaches ==
- Steel welded carriages 1933

== Diesel multiple units ==
- British Rail Class 100 1956–1958
- British Rail Class 119 1958
- British Rail Class 122 1958
- British Rail Class 128 1959

== Electric multiple units ==
- London Underground E Stock 1914
- London Underground G Stock 1924-1925
- London Underground O / P Stock 1937-1941
- London Underground Q38 Stock 1938–1940
- London Underground R38/1 & R38/2 Stock rebuilt 1948-1953
- London Underground R47 Stock built 1949-1950
- London Underground 1956 Stock 1957–1959
- Melbourne (Australia) "Harris" trains 1956–1971
- Toronto Subway G-series built 1953–1959

== Special orders ==
- Pioneer – an amphibious railcar used by Magnus Volk's Brighton and Rottingdean Seashore Electric Railway 1894; scrapped 1910
- 14 68 ft Palace on Wheels coaches (Rajasthan- Jaipur, Jodhpur, Jaisalmer, Bikaner, Alwar, Udaipur, Bundi, Kota, Jhalawar, Dungarpur, Dholpur, Bharatpur, Sirohi, and Kishangarh)- for Indian Maharajah 1936; now operated by Indian Railways as tourist train

== Military ==
- Pivoting sections for the Mulberry Harbour for the British War Office 1944
