= Hurst Nelson =

Scottish railway rolling stock manufacturer

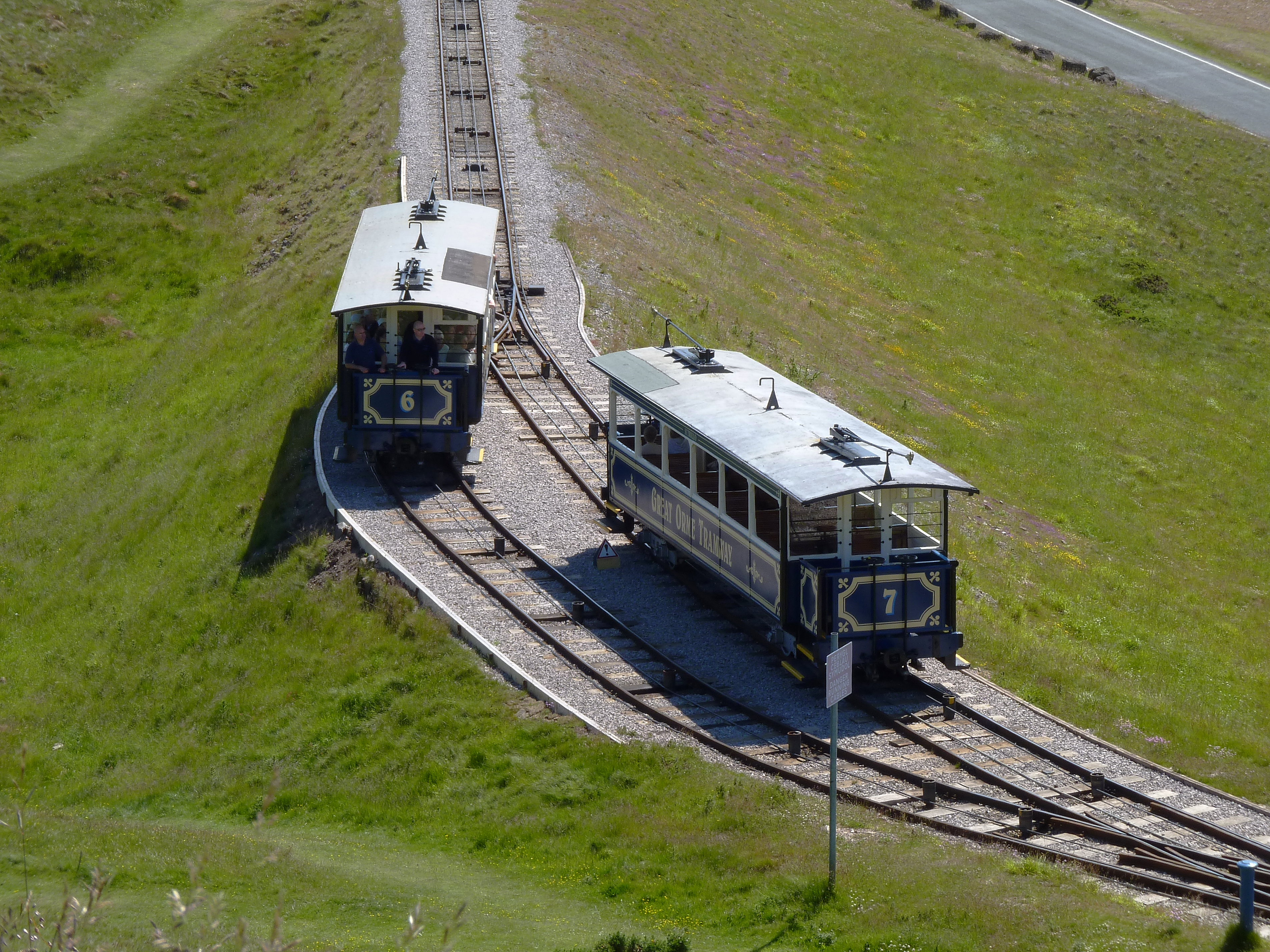
Two of the surviving original Hurst Nelson tramcars on the Great Orme Tramway, north Wales.

Hurst, Nelson and Company Ltd was a railway rolling stock manufacturer based in Motherwell, Scotland. The company also built many railway wagons, as well as trams and trolleybus carosseries for several local authorities.

== Products ==
=== Glasgow Subway ===
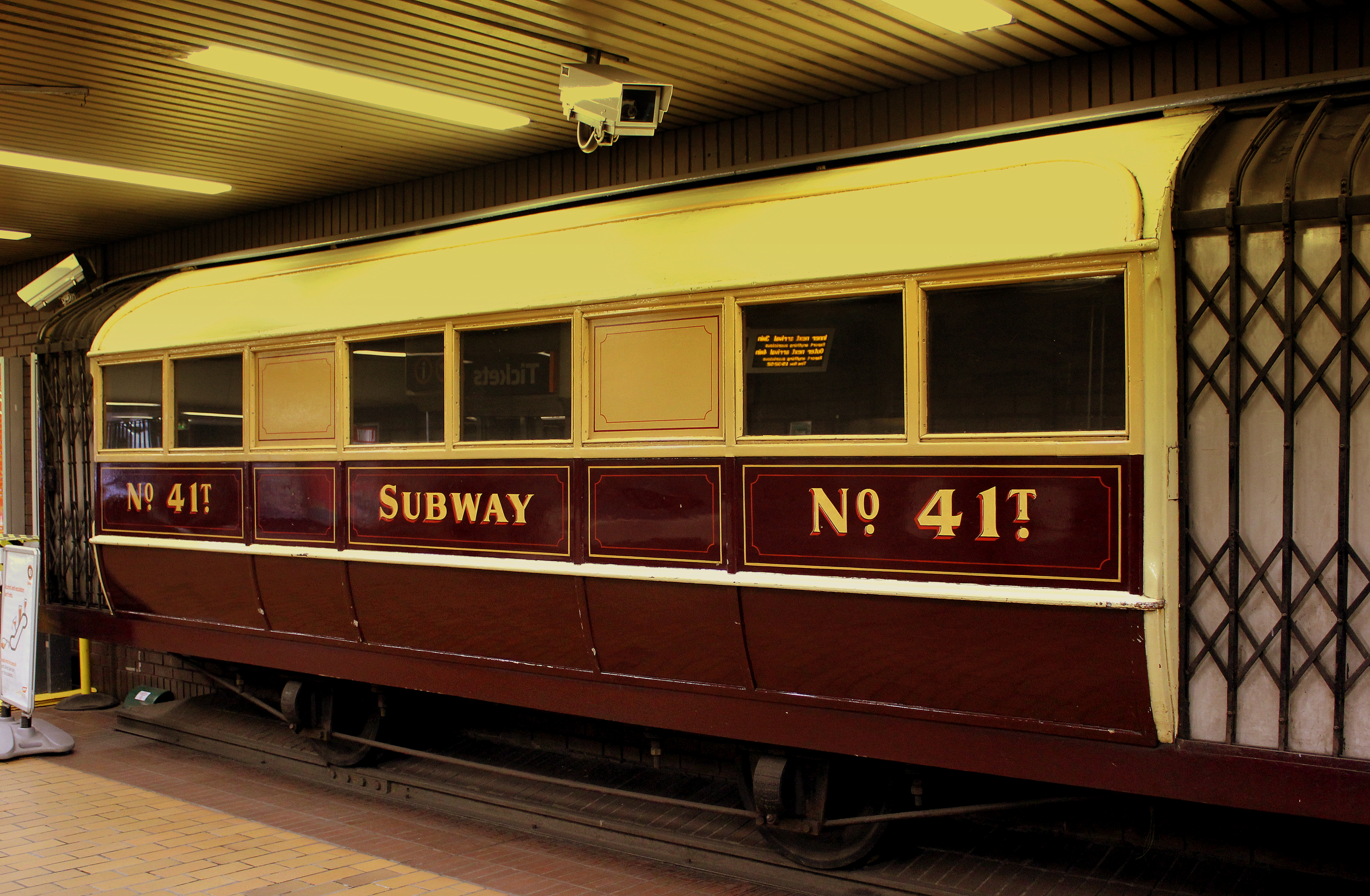
A Glasgow Subway 4-wheel carriage.

The company built the original trailer carriages for the Glasgow Subway. A batch of 24 four-wheeled vehicles were supplied in 1898. The wheels were of teak, with Bessemer steel tyres, and each had 24 seats, twelve along each side of the carriage. They were similar in style, although shorter than the gripper cars supplied by the Oldbury Railway Carriage and Wagon Company for the opening of the cable-hauled railway in 1896. They were not fitted with a mechanism for gripping the cable, nor did they have automatic brakes, and so relied on the brakes of the gripper cars in operation. Manual hand brakes were provided, and shackles were provided at each corner, so that they could be lowered down onto the tracks at the car sheds pits. Electric lighting was supplied by a jumper cable running from the adjacent gripper car, and the vehicles weighed 4.65 tons. Hurst Nelson displayed one of them at the Earl's Court exhibition centre in London.

=== London Underground ===
The company also supplied vehicles for the London Underground. In August 1905, they delivered two battery-electric locomotives, which were used for the construction of the Great Northern, Piccadilly and Brompton Railway, and subsequently for the Charing Cross, Euston and Hampstead Railway. They were 50.5 feet (15.4 m) long, with a cab at both ends and a compartment behind one of the cabs, which housed braking and traction control equipment. 80 batteries, arranged as two rows of 40, occupied the central section of the vehicle, which was lower than the cabs. Chloride Electrical Storage Company supplied the batteries, which had to be charged at charging stations. The vehicles weighed 55 tons, and were not fitted with current collector shoes, since none of the rails were electrified during construction.

Extensions and improvements to the District Railway (later the District line of the London Underground) in the early 1900s required additional rolling stock, and in 1910 Hurst Nelson received an order for 32 motor cars and 20 trailers, which were similar in both construction and appearance, and were known as C Stock. Traction control used a non-automatic electro-magnetic controller supplied by British Thomson-Houston Co., but the motors were to a new design, which included interpoles. They were the first use of such motors on the Underground, and probably in England. The cars were 49.5 feet (15.1 m) long, with double doors in the centre, and single doors at either end. Much of the bodywork was made of wood. There were some problems with the motor bogies, and 60 new bogies were provided between 1910 and 1922, although not all were for the Hurst Nelson vehicles, as the problem also affected the D Stock and E Stock, which had been supplied by other manufacturers in 1912 and 1914. The C stock trailer cars were subsequently modified at Acton Works to become motor cars in the 1928 Reconstruction Programme.

== Surviving vehicles ==
=== Still in service ===
The most notable example of Hurst Nelson rail vehicles still in service are the tramcars of the Great Orme Tramway. Seven tramcars were built for the Great Orme in 1902, of which four remain in service today. These vehicles are not preserved, as they have never ceased to be in revenue-earning service. With well over a century of use, they are the longest serving Hurst Nelson products.

=== Preserved trams ===
A small number of trams built by Hurst Nelson, and subsequently withdrawn from service, are now in heritage preservation.

- Newcastle 102 - Built 1901, and now preserved at the National Tramway Museum, Crich Derbyshire. Non-operational, it is hoped to bring it into working order in the near future.
- Hull 96 / Leeds 6 - Built 1901, and now preserved at Heaton Park Tramway. Originally Hull passenger tram 96, it later became Leeds departmental tram 6 for use by engineers.
- Southampton 45 - Built 1903, and the first British tram to enter into preservation. Now part of the National Tramway Museum, Crich.
- Paisley/Glasgow Corporation 68/1068 - Built 1919, and now preserved at the National Tramway Museum, Crich Derbyshire. Operational condition, as it would have been shortly after Paisley Corporation was absorbed by Glasgow Corporation.

=== Preserved railway wagons ===
A number of Hurst Nelson railway wagons have been preserved on heritage railways, particularly from their tank wagon range. These include the following, listed in order of construction date, starting with the oldest.

- Oil tank wagon 745 (Royal Daylight), built 1912, now at the Didcot Railway Centre.
- Three-plank coal wagon, built 1912 for coal mines near Radstock, now being restored by the Hurst Nelson Wagon Project, Williton, on the West Somerset Railway.
- Gunpowder Van No 57, Caledonian Railway, built 1922, now in the core collection of the Scottish Railway Preservation Society.
- Seven-plank 10T open wagon, end-door, number unknown, built 1923, now at East Kent Railway (heritage).
- Oil tank wagon 4497 (Shell), Class A, built 1930, registered with the LNER as No 27287, now at the Bluebell Railway.
- Oil tank wagon 1921 (Esso) 14T Class B, built 1941, originally Air Ministry No 812, then LMS No 162376, then Esso No 1921, now in Esso livery on the Bluebell Railway.
- Oil tank wagon A4513 (Shell-BP) 14T Class B, built 1941, now at the Great Central Railway, Leicestershire.
- Tar tank wagon 95 (South West Tar Distilleries), built 1941, now at the Watercress Line.
- Oil tank wagon 7522 (Shell-Mex) 14T Class B, built 1943, now at the Kent and East Sussex Railway.
- Coal hopper wagon, East Hetton Colliery wagon No 944, built 1944, originally served on the LNER, then with the NCB, now at the Bowes Railway.
- 20T hopper wagon No E270919, built 1946 for the LNER, now preserved in the National Railway Museum collection.
- Oil tank wagon 749659 (Petrochemicals Limited), built 1951 for benzene transport, later a carriage cleaning solution holder for London Underground, now at East Anglian Railway Museum.
- Oil tank wagon 47023 (Octel), built 1957, now at the Embsay and Bolton Abbey Steam Railway.
- Oil tank wagon 47042 (Octel), built 1958, now at the Embsay and Bolton Abbey Steam Railway.
