= London Underground C Stock =

London Underground C Stock may refer to:

- London Underground C Stock (District Railway)
- London Underground C69 and C77 Stock
