= Eastern United Colliery =

Former coal mine in Gloucestershire, United Kingdom

Coordinates: 51°48′00″N 02°30′37″W

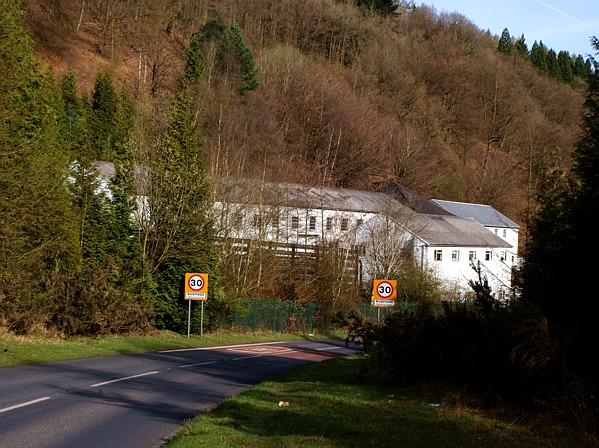
Old Eastern United Colliery buildings

Eastern United Colliery was a drift mine in the Forest of Dean, Gloucestershire, England served by the Great Western Railway's Forest of Dean Branch.

The colliery was one of the seven areas of deep gales - founded after the Dean Forest (Mines) Act in 1904.

The colliery exploited six seams containing 41,000,000 long tons (41,700,000 t) of coal which could give a working life of around 200 years (at an extraction rate of 200,000 long tons (203,000 t) per annum. The principal coal seam was the Coleford High Delf, a steam coal much in demand and said to be up to 5 ft 0 in (1.524 m) thick. Demand led to discussions with the Great Western Railway over the provision of a link to its network.

== History ==
The first gale was granted on 19 March 1906 to Mr. J. R. Brown. Henry Crawshay & Company was offered the gale in October 1907 and completed the purchase on 24 December 1907. The purchase took place because the company was aware that the coal reserves at its Lightmoor Colliery would not last ten years, let alone the predicted twenty.

Construction of the railway connection began in 1908 along with the sidings but the facilities were basic, having a two-lever ground frame allowing access to the complex. A signal box at Eastern United was not provided until late 1913.

In early 1914 it was announced that Eastern was not the success everyone hoped as the western portion of the gale could not be exploited because of its geological condition. By 1916 its fortunes had changed, the coal seam had levelled out. By April 1919 output was up to 250 long tons (254 t) per day. Accounts showed that the colliery was running at a loss until 1923, except for a small profit made in 1919.

Expenditure at Eastern was made to modernise the facilities (including the repair and replacement of the boilers, the fitting of electricity and pumping equipment) and the provision of railway vehicles. In 1914 twenty 12 long tons (12.2 t) wagons were purchased from the Gloucester Railway Carriage and Wagon Company (at a cost of £16 5s 6d per wagon) to complement thirty 10 long tons (10.2 t) others. The older wagons had been rented and subsequently purchased (at a cost of £8 16s per wagon) from the Ince Waggon & Ironworks Co. of Wigan, through their broker - the Lincoln Wagon Co. of Doncaster.

The colliery was nationalized in 1947 and became part of the National Coal Board South Western Division. It closed on 30 January 1959.

== See also ==
- Forest of Dean Coalfield
- National Coal Board
