= London Underground D Stock =

London Underground D Stock may refer to:

- London Underground D Stock (District Railway)
- London Underground D78 Stock
