= Rolling stock of the Watercress Line =

The Watercress Line operates a wide variety of locomotives and other stock as part of its preserved operations. More comprehensive information about the railway's locomotives and rolling stock can be found on the Watercress Line's website.

== Steam locomotives ==
=== Operational ===
Number & name	Locomotive	Notes	Livery	Image
35005 Canadian Pacific	SR Merchant Navy Class 4-6-2	Built in 1941 at Eastleigh Railway Works. Withdrawn in 1965 and moved to Woodham Brothers scrapyard in South Wales, where it stayed until 1973. It moved to the Watercress Line in 2006, and operated until 2008. Following an extensive overhaul, it returned to service in 2025.	BR Lined Green	
30506	LSWR S15 class 4-6-0	Built in 1920 at Eastleigh Railway Works, designed for use on heavy freight services. Withdrawn from service in 1964 and moved to Woodhams scrapyard in South Wales. moved to the Watercress line in 1976, where it was returned to steam in 1987. It operated until 2001, after which a lengthy overhaul saw it returned to service in 2019. Owned by the Urie Locomotive Society.	BR Unlined Black, Early Crest	
41312	LMS Class 2 2-6-2T	Built in May 1952 at Crewe Railway Works and spent its entire working life on the Southern Region of British Railways. It was withdrawn from service and moved to Woodhams scrapyard in South Wales where it stayed until 1974. It moved to the Watercress line in 1995 and returned to steam in 1999. Its most recent overhaul was completed in 2016.	BR Black, Late Crest	
3781	Hunslet Austerity 0-6-0ST	Built by Hunslet in 1952 as a saddle tank for the National Coal Board, working at Maesteg Colliery. It arrived on MHR in 1994 and was rebuilt as an 0-6-0T to resemble Thomas the Tank Engine. It continues to perform this role, both at the Watercress Line and on hire to other heritage railways. Its most recent overhaul was completed in 2024.	NWR Lined Blue	
1788	Peckett 0-4-0ST	Built in 1929 for use at Kilmersdon colliery in Somerset. Owned by the Somerset & Dorset Railway Trust, it moved to the Watercress Line in 2021.	Green	

=== Undergoing overhaul or restoration ===
Number & name	Locomotive	Notes	Livery	Image
30499	LSWR S15 class 4-6-0	Built in 1920 at Eastleigh Railway Works, designed for use on heavy freight services. Withdrawn from service in 1964 and moved to Woodhams scrapyard in South Wales and then to the Watercress Line in 1983. Owned by the Urie Locomotive Society.	N/A	
E828	LSWR S15 class 4-6-0	Built in 1927 at Eastleigh Railway Works. Withdrawn in 1964 and moved to Woodhams scrapyard in South Wales, where it stayed until 1981. It was returned to steam in 1994. Owned by the Eastleigh Railway Preservation Society, it last operated in 2002.	SR Olive Green	
34007 Wadebridge	SR Bulleid Light Pacific 4-6-2	Built in 1945 at Brighton Railway Works. Withdrawn from service in 1965 and moved to Woodhams scrapyard in South Wales, where it stayed until 1981. It returned to steam in 2006 at the Bodmin & Wenford Railway then moved to the Watercress Line in 2007, last operating in 2016. Following a sizeable donation towards the locomotive by a private individual, an overhaul to mainline standards is in progress, with much of this being carried out off site.	BR Lined Green	
75079	BR Standard Class 4 4-6-0	Built in 1956 at Swindon Railway Works. It spent much of its working life based at depots close to the Watercress Line, such as Basingstoke and Eastleigh. Withdrawn in 1966, and moved to Woodham Brothers scrapyard in South Wales, where it stayed until 1982. It moved to the Watercress Line in 2007, and is under restoration at Ropley, having never yet operated in preservation.	N/A	
92212	BR Standard Class 9F 2-10-0	Built in 1959 at Swindon Railway Works. Withdrawn in 1968 and spent from then until 1979 at Woodham Brothers scrapyard in South Wales. It returned to steam at the Great Central Railway in 1996, and later moved to the Watercress Line, where it last operated in 2019. Owned by Locomotive Services Ltd, for whom it is undergoing a contract overhaul at Ropley.	BR Black, Late Crest	
53808	S&DJR 7F 2-8-0	Built in 1925 by Robert Stephenson & Co in Darlington. Withdrawn in 1964, after which it spent 6 years at Woodham Brothers scrapyard in South Wales. It was then based on the West Somerset Railway until moving to the Watercress Line in 2020., where it last operated in 2023. Owned by the Somerset & Dorset Railway Trust.	BR unlined black, late crest	

=== In storage ===
Number & name	Locomotive	Notes	Livery	Image
30850 Lord Nelson	SR Lord Nelson Class 4-6-0	Built in 1926 at Eastleigh Railway Works. Withdrawn from service in 1962, later becoming part of the National Collection. Based at the Watercress Line since 2009 under agreement with the National Railway Museum. The locomotive was withdrawn from service in 2015.	SR Malachite Green Late BR, Lined Green	
34105 Swanage	SR West Country Class 4-6-2	Built in 1950 at Brighton Railway Works. Withdrawn in 1964, and spent from 1965 to 1978 at Woodham Brothers scrapyard in South Wales. It was restored at the Watercress Line where it returned to steam in 1987. Last steamed in 1997, its most recent overhaul was placed "on hold" in 2020, with the locomotive being stored at Ropley.	BR Lined Green	
73096	BR Standard Class 5 4-6-0	Built in 1955 at Derby Railway Works. Withdrawn in 1967 and moved to Woodham Brothers scrapyard in South Wales. Initially moved to the Watercress Line in 1985, it returned to steam in 1993. It moved away from the line in 2014, but returned in 2017. It last steamed in 2011 and is currently stored awaiting overhaul.	BR Lined Green, Late Crest	
80150	BR Standard Class 4 2-6-4T	Built in 1956 at Brighton Railway Works. Withdrawn in 1965 and sold to Woodham Brothers scrapyard in South Wales. Following several further changes of location, it moved to the Watercress Line in 2011, where it has remained in storage awaiting full restoration.	Unlined Black	
45379	LMS Stanier Class 5 4-6-0	Built in 1937 by Armstrong Whitworth of Newcastle. Withdrawn in 1965 and moved to Woodham Brothers scrapyard in South Wales, where it remained until 1974. It moved to the Watercress Line in 2002 and was returned to steam in 2010. It last operated in 2018, after which the engine moved to dry storage at the One:One Collection in Margate.	BR Lined Black, Late Crest	

== Diesel locomotives and multiple units ==
Number & name	Locomotive	Notes	Livery	Image
08032	British Rail Class 08	Built at Derby in 1954, withdrawn in 1974 and subsequently used by Foster Yeoman at Merehead quarry in Somerset. Moved to the Watercress Line in 2009.	Black	
08288	British Rail Class 08	Built at Derby in 1957, withdrawn by British Rail in 1983. It entered preservation at the Watercress Line in 1984 and has been based there ever since.	BR Blue	
D3462 (08377)	British Rail Class 08	Built at Darlington in 1957, withdrawn by British Rail in 1983. Preserved on the West Somerset Railway, then moved to the Watercress Line in 2013.	BR Green	
12082	British Rail Class 11	Built at Derby in 1950, withdrawn by British Rail in 1971 and was then used in industry, initially by the National Coal Board. Moved to the Watercress Line in 2010.	BR Black	
D8059 (20059)	British Rail Class 20	Built by Robert Stephenson & Hawthorns, Darlington, in 1961. Owned by the Somerset & Dorset Locomotive Company, it moved to the Watercress Line in 2019.	BR Green	
D8188 (20188)	British Rail Class 20	Built by English Electric at Newton-le-Willows in 1966. Owned by the Somerset & Dorset Locomotive Company, it moved to the Watercress Line in 2021.	BR Green	
47579 James Nightall G.C.	British Rail Class 47	Built by Brush Traction in Loughborough in 1964 and withdrawn from mainline service in 2004. Moved to the Watercress Line in 2017, on long-term loan from the Mangapps Railway Museum.	BR Blue (Stratford Large Logo)	
50027 Lion	BR Class 50	Built by English Electric in 1968, withdrawn from mainline service in 1991. Moved to the Watercress Line in 1992, then to the North Yorkshire Moors Railway in 1994. The locomotive returned to the Watercress Line in 2012.	Network SouthEast Revised	Class 50 50027 Lion
150231	British Rail Class 150	Diesel-hydraulic multiple unit built in 1987. On 31 July 2025, The Watercress Line announced that it had acquired 150231 from Porterbrook, joining its fleet of heritage railway rolling stock.	Regional Railways	
1125	British Rail Class 205	Diesel-electric multiple unit (DEMU) built in 1959. It was often used on the Mid-Hants Railway (Watercress Line), including on the last day of British Rail operation in 1973. After withdrawal from mainline operation in 2004 it was acquired by the Watercress Line.	BR Green	

== Passenger coaches ==
=== Pre-nationalisation passenger coaches ===
Number (type)	Original operator / Owner	Notes	Livery	Photograph
1353 (LSWR 'Ironclad' Brake Third Corridor)	Southern Railway	Built in 1923 at Eastleigh, converted for departmental use in the Exmouth Junction breakdown train in 1959. Arrived at the Watercress Line in 1979 and is stored in unrestored condition.	n/a	
1456 (Bulleid Open Third)	Southern Railway	Built in 1947 for use on the London to Bournemouth line. Moved to the Watercress Line in 2012 on a 25-year loan from the Bluebell Railway. Following restoration, it entered service in 2020.	SR Malachite Green	
4211 (Bulleid Semi-open Brake Third)	Southern Railway	Built in 1947 by the Birmingham Railway Carriage & Wagon Company. Converted to a mobile training coach around 1970, moved to the Watercress Line in 1976.	SR Malachite Green	
4367 (Bulleid semi-open Brake Third)	Southern Railway	Built in 1948 at Eastleigh. Withdrawn in 1966 and later used by the British Army as an inspection saloon at Long Marston. Arrived at the Watercress Line in 1992. This coach was subsequently heavily vandalised whilst in store.	n/a	
M45045M (Inspection Saloon)	London Midland and Scottish Railway	Built in 1940 at Wolverton. Preserved at the Llangollen Railway in 1992, then moved to the Watercress Line by 2000.	LMS Maroon	

=== British Railways Mark 1 passenger coaches (catering cars) ===
Number (type)	Notes	Livery	Photograph
S1105 (Griddle)	Built in 1952 at Doncaster as a Restaurant First, rebuilt to Griddle configuration in 1965.	British Railways Green	
S1668 (Buffet Restaurant)	Built in 1961 by Pressed Steel. Used in the Mid-Hants dining train 'The Watercress Belle'.	Pseudo Pullman – Umber and Cream	
S1807 (Restaurant Miniature Buffet)	Built in 1957 at York.	British Railways Green	
S1851 (Restaurant Miniature Buffet)	Built in 1960 at Wolverton.	British Railways Green	
S1973 (Unclassed Restaurant Car)	Built in 1961 at Swindon.	British Railways Green	

=== British Railways Mark 1 passenger coaches ===
Number (type)	Notes	Livery	Photograph
S3063 (First Open)	Built in 1955 at Doncaster. Moved to the Watercress Line from the West Somerset Railway in 2023.	British Railways blue & grey	1955 BR Mk 1 First Open 3063 at Ropley on the Watercress Line in 2025
S3067 (First Open)	Built in 1955 at Doncaster, moved to the Watercress Line in 1982. Carries the name 'Sage'.	British Railways Green	1955 BR Mk 1 First 3067 at Ropley on the Watercress Line in 2025
S3070 (First Open)	Built in 1955 at Doncaster, moved to the Watercress Line in 1982. Carries the name 'Fern'.	Umber & cream	
S3738 (Tourist Second Open)	Built in 1953 at Doncaster. Preserved in 1988 by VSOE, resold to the Watercress Line.	British Railways Green	
M3766 (Tourist Second Open)	Built in 1953 at York. Moved to the Watercress Line by 2014.	Maroon	
S3769 (Tourist Second Open)	Built in 1953 at York. Moved to the Watercress Line in 2006.	British Railways Green	
S3906 (Tourist Second Open)	Built in 1954 at Eastleigh. Preserved at the Watercress Line since 1982.	British Railways Green	
S4224 (Tourist Second Open)	Built in 1956 at York. Initially preserved by the Scottish Railway Preservation Society in 1982, moved to the Watercress Line by 2006.	British Railways Green	BR Mk.I TSO No.S4224
S4423 (Tourist Second Open)	Built in 1956 by the Birmingham Railway Carriage and Wagon Company. Preserved at the Watercress Line since 1982.	British Railways Green	
S4549 (Tourist Second Open)	Built in 1956 at York. One of the first two carriages delivered to the Watercress Line by rail in 1976.	British Railways Green	
S4600 (Tourist Second Open)	Built in 1956 at York. One of the first two carriages delivered to the Watercress Line by rail in 1976, it was initially used to provide additional buffet facilities at Alresford.	British Railways Green	
S4822 (Second Open)	Built in 1959 by the Birmingham Railway Carriage and Wagon Company. Initially preserved in 1990, moved to the Watercress Line in 2006 where it was converted to First Open seating layout.	British Railways Green	BR Mk.I FO No.S4822
S4823 (Second Open)	Built in 1959 by the Birmingham Railway Carriage and Wagon Company. Initially preserved in 1990, acquired by the Watercress Line in 2011.	British Railways Green	1955 BR Mk 1 Second Open 4823 at Ropley on the Watercress Line in 2025
W4910 (Tourist Second Open)	Built in 1961 at Wolverton.	British Railways Maroon	
S4977 (Second Open)	Built in 1962 at Wolverton, moved to the Watercress Line by 2006.	British Railways Green	
E15939 (Corridor Composite)	Built in 1956 at Wolverton. Preserved at the Colne Valley Railway in 1987, moved to the Watercress Line in 2005. Carries incorrect number (15969).		
M21208 (Brake Corridor Composite)	Built in 1958 by Metro-Cammell. Moved to the Watercress Line in 1983.		
S21236 (Brake Corridor Composite)	Built in 1961 at Swindon. Initially preserved in 1981, moved to the Watercress Line by 2005 after spending some time as the support coach for locomotive E828.	British Railways Green	
S21252 (Brake Corridor Composite)	Built in 1963 at Derby. Moved to the Watercress Line in 1982.	British Railways Green	
S25591 (Brake Corridor Composite)	Built in 1957 at Wolverton. Preserved by the Plym Valley Railway in 1987, moved to the Watercress Line by 2007.	British Railways Green	
S34618 (Brake Second Corridor)	Built in 1955 at Gloucester. Moved to the Watercress Line from nearby Micheldever yard in 1977.	British Railways Green	
S34947 (Brake Second Corridor)	Built in 1956 by Metro-Cammell. Preserved at the Buckinghamshire Railway Centre in 1977, then moved to the Watercress Line in 1985.	British Railways Green	
S35329 (Brake Second Corridor)	Built in 1962 at Wolverton. Moved to the Watercress Line in 1997.	British Railways Green	
S35331/S80223 (Brake Second Corridor/NNX)	Built in 1962 at Wolverton. Moved to the Watercress Line by 2003, converted to a "Real Ale Bar" and later to a generator vehicle for use with dining trains.	British Railways Crimson and Cream	

== Non-passenger coaching stock ==
Origin	Number	Type	Notes	Photograph
SECR	1995	SECR Parcels & Miscellaneous Van	Built in 1922 at Ashford. Moved to the Watercress Line in 1976.	
SR	765	Guard/Luggage Van	Built in 1938 at Eastleigh, moved to the Watercress Line in 1976.	
SR	S1768S	Covered Carriage Truck	Built in 1938 at Eastleigh, moved to the Watercress Line in 1977.	

== Goods Stock ==
=== Brake vans ===
Origin	Number	Type	Notes	Photograph
LSWR	12424	4w brake van	Built in 1900 at Eastleigh. Owned by the Somerset & Dorset Railway Museum Trust, moved to the Watercress Line in 2021.	
SR	49001	25ton "Pillbox" Brake Van	Built in 1942 at Ashford. Acquired from Long Marston in 1992 by the Urie Locomotive Society, moved to the Watercress Line.	
SR	55506	20 ton "Dance Hall" Brake Van	Built in 1927 at Lancing, moved to the Watercress Line in the late 1970s.	
SR	56302	25 ton "Queen Mary" Brake Van	Built in 1936 at Ashford.	
SR	56506	25 ton "Pillbox" Brake Van	Built in 1941 at Lancing. Moved to the Watercress Line in 1992.	
BR	953701	4-Wheel Brake Van	Built in Darlington in 1958.	
GWR	35907	GWR Toad Brake Van	Built in 1942 at Swindon, moved to the Watercress Line in 1976.	

=== Open wagons ===
Origin	Number	Type	Notes	Photograph
BR	264632	16 Ton Mineral Wagon	Built in 1957 in Derbyshire.	
BR	481682	Steel High Side Wagon	Built in 1951 at Shildon.	
BR	725540	Shoc Open Wagon	Built in 1958 at Derby. Moved to the Watercress Line from MOD Long Marston in 1996, owned by the Urie Locomotive Society.	
BR	726024	Shoc Open Wagon	Built in 1959 at Derby. Moved to the Watercress Line from RNAD Bedenham in 1994, owned by the Urie Locomotive Society.	
BR	730821	Tube Wagon	Built in 1960 at Derby. Moved to the Watercress Line in 1994.	
BR	741751	Pipe Wagon	Built in 1961 at Wolverton.	
BR	741764	Pipe Wagon	Built in 1961 at Wolverton.	
LNER	276733	Open Wagon	Built in 1945 at Faverdale (Darlington), original number unknown. Ex-Port of Bristol Authority.	
LMS?	460001	Open Wagon	Converted ex-tank wagon with two side planks.	
SR	7	8 Plank Open Wagon	Original identity unknown, ex-Port of Bristol Authority.	

=== Flat wagons ===
Origin	Number	Type	Notes	Photograph
BR	453433	13 Ton Lowfit Wagon	Built in 1957 at Shildon. Moved to the Watercress Line in 2007.	
BR	506889	Conflat A Wagon	Built in 1959 at Pressed Steel. Purchased from GCR Ruddington in 2009.	
BR	700471	Conflat A Wagon	Built in 1956 at Swindon. Purchased from GCR Ruddington in 2009.	
LSWR	11813	Lowmac Machinery Flat	Built in 1921 at Eastleigh. Owned by Urie Loco Society, moved to the Watercress Line in 2023 following a period of time at the Locomotion Museum at Shildon.	

=== Covered goods vans ===
Origin	Number	Type	Notes	Photograph
BR	760337	Goods van	Built at Wolverton in 1953. Spent some time after restoration carrying the fictitious number 872176.	1953 BR Goods Van 760337 on the Watercress Line in 2025
BR	763661	Fitted Box Van	Built at Wolverton in 1955. Moved to the Watercress Line in 1995.	
BR	772824	Box Van	Built at Ashford in 1957.	
BR	776446	Palvan	Built at Faverdale (Darlington) in 1958. Moved to the Watercress Line in 1978.	
BR	782114	Palvan	Built at Wolverton in 1961.	
BR	786834	Fitted Van	Built by Pressed Steel in 1962.	
BR	854732	Shoc Van	Built at Faverdale (Darlington) in 1959.	1959 BR Goods Van 854732 at Ropley on the Watercress Line in 2025
BR	870067	Meat Van	Built at Wolverton in 1953. Moved to the Watercress Line from the Bodmin Railway in 2019.	BR 10t Ventilated Meat Van 870067 at Alton July 2025
BR	4134	Palvan	Original identity unknown.	
GWR	105761	Gunpowder Van	Built at Swindon, original build date and number unknown.	
LMS	517317	Fitted Van	Built at Wolverton in 1942, moved to the Watercress Line in the late 1970s. Restored in 2010.	1942 LMS Goods Van 517317 at Ropley on the Watercress Line in 2025
LMS	520771	Covered Vanfit	Built at Wolverton in 1943. Moved to the Watercress Line in 1994.	
LSWR	Unknown	Fruit van	Built at Eastleigh in 1908–10, original number unknown. Owned by the Somerset & Dorset Railway Museum Trust, moved to the Watercress Line in 2021. Carries fictional identity of S&DJR no, 747.	
SR	47777	Box Van	Built at Ashford in 1940 (original number was 49741), moved to the War Department in 1943. Later used at the Longmoor and Marchwood Military Railways before moving to the Watercress Line in 1978.	
SR	53845	Livestock van	Originally built as a box van for the LMS in 1942, numbered 514791, this was one of several box vans purchased by the Watercress Line in the late 1970s. It was rebuilt to represent an SR cattle van in 2015, adopting its current identity at that time.	

=== Tank and hopper wagons ===
Origin	Number	Type	Notes	Photograph
GWR	2960	Three-Axle Milk Tank	Built in 1943 as a milk tanker for United Dairies, later used for waste oil at Immingham. Moved to the Watercress Line by 2013.	
South West Tar Distilleries	95	Tar Wagon	Built in 1940 at Hurst Nelson, Motherwell. The first wagon to arrive on the Watercress Line at Alresford in 1974.	
Blue Circle Products	29	Presflo Wagon	Built in 1960 at Butterley.	Presflo Cement Hopper at Alton

== Cranes ==
Number	Type	Builder	Notes	Photograph
DS58	10 Ton Crane	Taylor & Hubbard	Built in 1955. DS58 was originally purchased as a source of spares for DS414 but was restored as it turned out to be in good condition.	
DS414	10 Ton Crane	Taylor & Hubbard	Built in 1948.	
DS1580	45 Ton Steam Crane	Ransomes and Rapier	Built in 1944. Formerly at Exmouth Junction shed.	
