= London Underground C Stock (District Railway) =

British rolling stock

C Stock
- In service: 1910–1958
- Manufacturer: Hurst Nelson

Specifications
- Car length: 49 ft (14.94 m)
- Width: 8 ft 9 1/2 in (2.680 m)
- Height: 12 ft 3 1/4 in (3.740 m)
- Weight: 33.16 long tons (33.69 t; 37.14 short tons)
- Seating: 48

The C Stock were electric multiple units built for London's District Railway in 1910.

== Background ==
The additional rolling stock was required to increase the frequency of the service (particularly given the introduction of automatic electro-pneumatic signalling which allowed less headway between trains), plus the four-tracking of the section west of Hammersmith which allowed a greater frequency of trains to and from Richmond.

== History ==
Fifty-two cars were built by Hurst Nelson, thirty-two were driving motor cars and the remaining twenty were trailer cars. The design was based on the earlier B Stock and was the basis for the D Stock trains which appeared in 1912.

In 1928 the 20 trailer cars were rebuilt into motor cars. In 1938, one car was withdrawn, and seven were rebuilt from motor to trailer; the following year, one of these plus seven of the motors were rebuilt as control trailers. All fourteen had started life as motors. Two more cars were withdrawn in 1941. During 1950–51, three more motors were converted to trailers; two of these had been built as trailers. Also in 1950, general withdrawal commenced, and the last three cars of C Stock were withdrawn in March 1958.

In the 1940s the C, D and E stocks were reclassified as "H Stock" (signifying hand-operated doors), along with other pre-1938 District Line rolling stock that had not been converted to have air-operated doors. The H Stock was largely eliminated by the early 1950s, following replacement by R Stock. The remaining cars were largely confined to the Olympia shuttle service and were withdrawn from passenger service by the late 1950s. A few examples continued in use for a time, painted grey, as "Stores Carriers", before being finally broken up in May 1963.

The C Stock remains the only fleet of London Underground carriages to have been built in Scotland. No vehicles have survived into preservation. In appearance, they were similar to the B Stock.
