= Shildon railway works =

Railway workshops in England

Coordinates: 54.625021°N 1.652446°W

Shildon railway works opened in 1833 in the town of Shildon in County Durham, England. Originally built to serve the Stockton and Darlington Railway the works grew to cover 40 acres (16 ha) (11 acres or 4.5 ha roofed), employing 2,750 staff.

== History ==
Shildon was the terminus of the Stockton & Darlington Railway (S&DR), when it opened in 1825. Its first locomotive superintendent was Timothy Hackworth, who maintained their locomotives at the Soho Works. Thomas Hackworth (Timothy's brother) was works manager at the Soho Works.

The beginnings of the works were small -

'Only about 50 persons (were) employed in the works, and few of them skilled, with no tools except hand lathes.. no means of raising heavy parts, but the screwjack of old fashioned make. Boiler and cylinder, mine old friends tell me, were got from Newcastle"

— Bishop Auckland Herald 3/9/1863

In 1827, Timothy Hackworth built the locomotive Royal George at the Soho Works. It was also in this period that the works received an order from the Tsar of Russia for a locomotive. Shildon produced the engine and Hackworth's son John Wesley Hackworth was dispatched with drivers and mechanics to deliver it to Russia.

These works were to be purchased by the S&DR company in 1855 and closed in 1883. Hackworth was the first of 22 managers of the works in their 151-year history, a post he held between 1833 and 1840.

A trade union was formed in 1899 after growing discontent amongst the workers. One of the grievances was a requirement to work overtime. An average working day was 11 hours, 06.00 to 17.00, with overtime taking the working day to 21.00. The men were told that their 'boards' would not be issued for the Saturday shift if they refused the overtime. The boards were where the men recorded their work, without their board they could not work.

In 1962 the Shildon Works underwent a £800,000 modernisation following the creation of the British Rail Workshops Division. This saw the works equipped to repair BR wagons and from 1970, wagons from abroad. A notable wagon which came out of the works on this period was the 'Presflo' air-discharge cement wagon along with high capacity coal and Freightliner wagons. The forge at Shildon also produced a large proportion of drop stampings for other railway works.

The works repair shop had the capacity to overhaul and repair 800 wagons a week. Production figures show that between 1965 and 1982 the works build 11,083 'Merry-go-round' 32.5 tonne capacity coal hoppers.

== Campaign to Save the Works and Closure ==
=== 1982 ===
The closure of the works was announced on 23 April 1982 by British Rail Engineering Ltd (BREL).

At the time of the announcement the works employed 2,600 people and amounted to 86% of the male workforce's manufacturing jobs in the town.

Eight days before the announcement of the closure there were rumours that it may come.

"Shildon rail workers joined a national fight with BR today over the expected shutdown of vital rail works... This could mean the complete shutdown of one or more railway engineering plants... Worried union leaders from Shildon and York joined a demonstration outside BR's London HQ"

— Evening Dispatch 14/4/1982

With negotiations under way local journalists reported being hung up on when trying to call union officials at the works. These negotiations received a blow on 17 April, when works National Union of Railwaymen (NUR) chair Roy Jones collapsed on his way to work from a suspected stroke. He was in London for negotiations on 13 and 14 April and the strain is believed to have caused the stroke.

Interviewed in 1990, Sidney Weighell (General Sec. NUR) recalled first hearing of the closure plan -

"When I had first heard about the closure, at one of the regular lunches [Sir Peter] Parker and I had started having, when he put this paper in front of me I said 'No way are you going to close Shildon, no way!' I was determined and he knew that. I had agreed, I had to realistically, that there would be cut-backs, but I was determined to try and keep Shildon going somehow. I knew that once you closed it down it'd never be re-opened. They never are. To close something is too easy and to start it up almost impossible. So he had backed down."

— Sidney Weighell, Interviewed 7/5/1990

A trade union march was organised for 29 April, which was to assemble at 10am on the playing field of Sunnydale School. Members of the Sedgefield District Council closure working party were authorised to attend as 'approved duty' with pay. The march worked its way through the town, led by figures including Derek Foster MP and Roland Boyes MEP, to the local football ground.

"More than 5000 people poured through the doomed railway town yesterday in the biggest show of strength in its history. The protest line was a mile long... Shildon came to a sudden standstill as 2,500 wagon workers marched to save their jobs joined by women, children, and pensioners."

— Northern Echo 30/4/1982

BREL set out its case for closure in a special edition of Railtalk Magazine using a question and answer format.

'Why Shildon? Shildon is BREL principal wagon-building works and has a capacity to build some 1,200-1,500 wagons per year, and to repair in excess of 20,000 wagons per year. There are no new build orders in for 1983 and prospects for 1984 and 1985 indicate that future needs are insignificant in relation to the capacity available. Operating Shildon on the substantially reduced repairs workload only would not be viable and would lead to substantial losses in 1983, with no prospect of a return to profit in the future'.

— Railtalk Special

On 5 May a joint report by Durham and Sedgefield Councils' planning departments was issued. It stated that closure would result in the loss of 2,180 jobs and leave one in four of the "insured population in the Bishop Auckland Employment Exchange area" unemployed. A further 450 jobs with suppliers to the works would also be lost.

At 19.30 on the evening of 7 May a trades union meeting was held in the works canteen to discuss progress in the campaign to save the facility. A strike was discussed but "Derby were lukewarm, but Glasgow suggested an immediate strike because of fears that there would be a dwindling of workshops". A protest to London was thought to be a better idea and a train chartered to take people to the capital. Ultimately it was decided that travellers would pay £5 each with the remaining amount coming from the fighting fund.

In his 1990 interview Weighell recalled the Shildon branch of the NUR -

"Whenever you had a meeting of branches the people from Shildon always stood out. The others would be perhaps a bit pushy. Argumentative, but those from Shildon would be quieter. It was bit like they were not used to having to fight their corner. I know it may sound strange, but they were sometimes like country people, unused to meeting the sort of people you'd get at a general meeting. The Branch was a big one, one of the biggest, and yet it rarely seemed to have much clout. Bit subdued. Nice people though, but maybe a bit too accommodating."

— Sidney Weighell, Interviewed 7/5/1990

Dennis Lees arrived as acting manager of the works on 10 May, replacing Derek Clarke who had been made acting manager at the Doncaster facility.

On 25 May a deputation left the for London with 600 people travelling south in eleven coaches from Darlington at 07.15 bound for Kings Cross. Arriving at 11.00 the party marched on the British Rail (BR) headquarters. There they delivered 630 letters to the chairman of BR Sir Peter Parker. They moved on to the Houses of Parliament to lobby members of parliament before returning to Kings Cross and arriving back at Darlington at 22.20.

On 29 May there was a large rally in Shildon with marchers moving off from the Civic Hall to the park at 10.30 and speeches beginning at 11.15. Official guests included Albert Booth MP (Shadow Minister for Transport), Derek Foster MP (Constituency MP), Jack Cunningham MP (Chair. Labour Northern Group of MPs), Ted Fletcher and Roland Boyes MEP (Constituency MEP).

An official at the rally recalled the day -

"I remember being on the platform and watching the faces down there in the crowd. As the politicians and union leaders spoke you could see their faces changing. They'd been full of enthusiasm marching through the Town, full of hope. But as they listened to the tired old clichés coming out of their "leaders" you could see them losing heart. They started to leave before the end. On the fringes of the crowd, with the speakers still talking, you could see them going. Derek Foster, he knew what was happening, tried to rally them, to get them lifted again, but they'd heard enough."

— Official at Mass Meeting - May 1982

On the same day the Northern Echo reported that Prime Minister Margaret Thatcher was to meet with local MP Derek Foster to discuss the Shildon closure plan.

'Yesterday's announcement that the Prime Minister was to involve herself with the proposals came as a surprise to the local union leaders. They said they were delighted with the news. 'It came out of the blue.' said John Priestly who, with the NUR and Boilermakers' Society convenors, had an hour long meeting with Transport Minister David Howell in London on Thursday... 'The Minister said he would look into our case and appeared to agree with us that more freight should go by rail instead of road. We were very impressed by his sympathetic attitude' said Mr Priestly."

— Northern Echo 29/5/1982

On 4 June BR announced a postponement of the closure with a decision to come in early 1983 on the future of the works. Union leaders at a local level said they "delighted that our industrial strength has brought about a change of attitude." However, the NUR leaders in London were more cautious that a postponement was not a reprieve. A local newspaper did not draw this distinction and declared -

"Saved!" The six week battle to save Shildon was won on Friday night when British Rail management postponed controversial plans to axe the whole work force from April next year."

— Jim Gilchrist, Evening Despatch 7/6/1982

The proposed Channel Tunnel came up for discussion at a meeting of the Works Working Party on 24 June and the need for wagons for the new tunnel.

On 18 August acting works manager Dennis Lees wrote to all staff -

'As you are aware we are currently facing serious workload shortages... It was agreed with the Special Working Party that we should first offer voluntary redundancy to all adult staff... In the event that sufficient volunteers do not come forward, the alternative at the present time can only be a shorter working week for everybody as there is no intention to enforce redundancy. If we are to survive, it's absolutely necessary for us reduce our present staffing and our overhead costs. Every effort is being made to seek new work and to find new ways of reducing our costs. It is, however, vital that we reduce the size of the workforce in keeping with the workload available, as a shorter working week will increase costs and therefore not attract work to this factory. For this reason I am again asking for staff to apply for voluntary redundancy'.

— Dennis Lees - Acting Works Manager, OUR FUTURE

The Daily Mirror ran a two-page spread about the town on 4 October -

'Walter Nunn has been a railwayman since January 1938... standing beside a replica of the Hackworth's locomotive he said, "The process has already begun. The community is already divided by the "offer" of redundancies. What does the alder man say when the carrot of a pay-off is dangled? What does a man say if he is tired or ill and handicapped from an injury? It's a terrible dilemma, because we know when the redundancies are taken up, the workforce is weakened and fighting far survival then is much harder. No apprentices are to be taken on this year. This had not happened for 150 years. They're cutting the bloodline"'.

— John Pilger, Daily Mirror 4/10/1982

In December 1982 the Association of District Councils (ADC) reported that BR wagons at that time carrying scrap metal were to be 'life-expired and withdrawn from service by May 1984'. This announcement resulted in discussions at the Policy and Resources Committee of Sedgefield District Council on 13 December. There it was pointed out that the withdrawal of these wagons would put a serve strain on road haulage resources. It became clear that some local authorities were to replace the withdrawn wagons and apply for railway facilities under provisions of the Railways Act 1974 (Section 8). The act allowed for private or public industry to build their own access to sidings on the rail network. Hopes that these new wagons would be built at Shildon were soon dashed, with the Policy Resource Committee reporting -

'Foreseeing the position which will arise in 1984, a Working Party of representatives from BR, British Steel Corporation, and the Scrap Federation plans to introduce a nationwide rail service in new purpose-built wagons for which a grant from the Government under Section 8 (Railway Act 1974) is required if the scheme is to be viable.... The ADC points out that for such a grant to be forthcoming the support of local authorities whose road network would be affected by the lorry movement is required and Councils are asked to write to the Dept. of Transport supporting grant aid to the Standard Railway Wagon Company Ltd which is prepared to build the special new box wagons'.

— Policy Resource Committee, Sedgefield District Council

Any new wagons for the movement of scrap metal in areas that would be adversely impacted by an increase in road haulage were to be built by private industry.

=== 1983 ===
J. Palette (Dir. of Personnel, British Rail Board) confirmed the closure of Shildon Works in 1984. In a letter to unions on 18 February 1983 he stated that work would be transferred from the town to work in Doncaster and other BREL sites.

The Works Joint Committee gathered on 4 March to discuss the closure announcement. Local MP Derek Foster believed that the campaign to save the works had been a "tremendous achievement" but that it had made little difference to the outcome. Some regarded the meeting as a wake for the works while others wanted to redouble efforts and continue to campaign.

In June, Minister for Trade and Industry Norman Lamont wrote to Councillor G. W. Terrans (Leader, Durham County Council Labour Group) -

'...With regard to the Shildon closures, the Government has shown its concern at the implication for local employment by setting up a committee of BR, Local Authority and Government officials to examine ways of maximising assistance. The redundancies will fall in the Durham and South West Darlington TTWA (Travel to Work Area) and IA (Intermediate Area) eligible for selective financial assistance. However, the Government considers that it would be premature to try and predict the full effect of redundancies which are not to be completed until December 1984...'

— Norman Lamont, Minister for Trade and Industry, Letter 23/6/1983

Sedgefield District Council appreciated the need for government grants and subsidies to encourage new industries into the area. These incentives were dependent on the Department for Trade and Industry (DTI) classification. The council were seeking to upgrade their area from an Assisted Area (AA) to a Special Development Area (SDA).

The Evening Despatch reported in August 1983 -

'Workers at Shildon Wagon 'Works are to receive drastically improved redundancy pay offers. In a surprise move BREL has offered to increase the maximum pay-off to aver £5,000, an increase of £3,000. BREL are also sending a team of redundancy experts to the Works to give advice to the 1,000 men who face the dole if closure goes ahead. The increase will be seen as an incentive to the workers to accept BREL's offer. But the introduction is conditional on the unions agreeing to the closure of Shildon, Horwich, and Temple Mills. A BREL spokesman, Bernard Ault said, 'This extension of supplementary payments will increase the financial terms available to many employees not wishing to transfer to other areas'".

— Evening Despatch 12/8/1983

=== 1984 ===
Labour leader Neil Kinnock MP visited Shildon on 28 April 1984 and spoke on the situation -

"I wish I could come here with good news, or a change of view by the Government, but I cannot. Reminded every day of Shildon by Derek Foster, (later Chief Opposition Whip) my PPS, which, for Derek, stands for Preserve Production in Shildon I know what you have been through. Any other Government would have been impressed by the fight, the faith, trust and loyalty and would have changed their decision. The Prime Minister is constantly preaching 'Do it yourself', but what complete hypocrisy... You have had accolades from BREL, even by Thatcher's ideals you have done enough to exist, but no, you can't exist due to dogma. We have a run-down British Rail - she never uses it - and an ageing wagon stock... The Tories cannot adjust to the idea that unemployment is not free and it is growing more expensive every year. We shed jobs when we should be investing in a properly up-to-date system. Other Governments see the need of railway networks, good connections, why not this Government? Instead we have a Government which seems to have declared war on work. With work you get income, freedom and rights, without you have to fall in line..."

— Neil Kinnock MP - Speech 28/4/1984

An announcement came that the works would officially close on 30 June 1984.

BREL offered the town a £300,000 loan guarantee package but this was thought to be not enough. Then on 7 June, David Mitchell (Parliamentary Under Sec. Dept. of Transport) set up a group at the ministry to try and reach agreement on an improved offer.

The taking up of the railway lines linking the works to the network were reported by the Northern Echo on 25 June -

'The last rites have started as Shildon Wagon Works' proud 150-year history grinds slowly to a halt. The doomed works are now echoing to the sound of the mechanical digger as the old tracks (connecting the works to the lines at Shildon station) are ripped from the ground... The remnants of a once-mighty workforce looked solemnly on and knew there was no going back. Yard transport worker, Colin Russell, said "They are cutting the head off before the body's died. It's a sign of the end and it's now irretrievable- there's no going back now."

— END OF THE LINES AT DOOMED WORKS, Northern Echo 25/6/1984

== Sources ==
- Simmons, J., (1986) The Railway in Town and Country, Newton Abott: David and Charles
- Larkin, E.J., Larkin, J.G., (1988) The Railway Workshops of Great Britain 1823-1986, Macmillan Press
- Smith, George Turner (2015). Thomas Hackworth: Locomotive Engineer. Fonthill. ISBN 978-1-78155-464-7.
