= London Underground E Stock =

Steel-bodied cars for the London Underground

E Stock
- In service: 1914–1958
- Manufacturer: GRC&W

Specifications
- Car length: 49 ft (14.94 m)
- Width: 8 ft 9 1/2 in (2.68 m)
- Height: 12 ft 3 1/4 in (3.74 m)
- Weight: 33.16 long tons (33.69 t; 37.14 short tons)
- Seating: 48

The London Underground E Stock were steel-bodied cars built for the London Underground in 1914 by the Gloucester Railway Carriage and Wagon Company.

Thirty cars were built, twenty-six driving motor cars and four trailers. The E stock was based on the earlier C Stock and D Stock but differed in that the roof was elliptical rather than the clerestory roof of the C Stock and D Stock.

During 1950–51, four motors (one of which had been built as a trailer) were converted to trailers. Also in 1951, general withdrawal commenced, and the last car of E Stock was withdrawn in March 1958.

In the 1940s the C, D and E stocks were reclassified as "H Stock" (signifying hand-operated doors), along with other pre-1938 District Line rolling stock that had not been converted to have air-operated doors. The H Stock was largely eliminated by the early 1950s, following replacement by R Stock. The remaining cars were largely confined to the Olympia shuttle service. While the last example was withdrawn from passenger service in 1958, one motor car was used as a "Stores Carrier" car No. SC636, painted in the then-current LT service stock grey livery and fitted with side buffers and a screw link coupling at the cab end. SC636 was observed in use in the summer of 1960 but had been withdrawn by February 1962. No E Stock car has been preserved.

They were generally similar in appearance to the B Stock, except that the E Stock had an elliptical roof.
