= London Underground D Stock (District Railway) =

British rolling stock

D Stock
- In service: 1912–1958
- Manufacturer: Met Cammell

Specifications
- Car length: 49 ft (14.94 m)
- Width: 8 ft 9 1/2 in (2.680 m)
- Height: 12 ft 3 1/4 in (3.740 m)
- Weight: 33.16 long tons (33.69 t; 37.14 short tons)
- Seating: 48

The D Stock were electric multiple units built by Metropolitan Amalgamated Railway Carriage & Wagon in Saltley, England for London's District Railway in 1912.

== History ==
A total of thirty cars were built, twenty-two were driving motor cars and eight were trailers. In 1928 the eight trailer cars were rebuilt into motor cars at Acton Works.

Two cars were withdrawn in 1941. During 1950–51, four motors were converted: three to trailers, and one to a control trailer. Also in 1950, general withdrawal commenced, and the last car of D Stock was withdrawn in February 1958.

These units were very similar to the earlier B and C Stock trains. In the 1940s the C, D and E stocks were reclassified as "H Stock" (signifying hand-operated doors), along with other pre-1938 District Line rolling stock that had not been converted to have air-operated doors. The H Stock was largely eliminated by the early 1950s, following replacement by R Stock. The remaining cars were largely confined to the Olympia shuttle service and were withdrawn from passenger service by the late 1950s. One continued in use for a time in grey livery as a "Stores Carrier" motor car SC637, before being finally broken up in May 1963.

No vehicles have survived into preservation.
