= London Underground Q38 Stock =

Q38 Stock
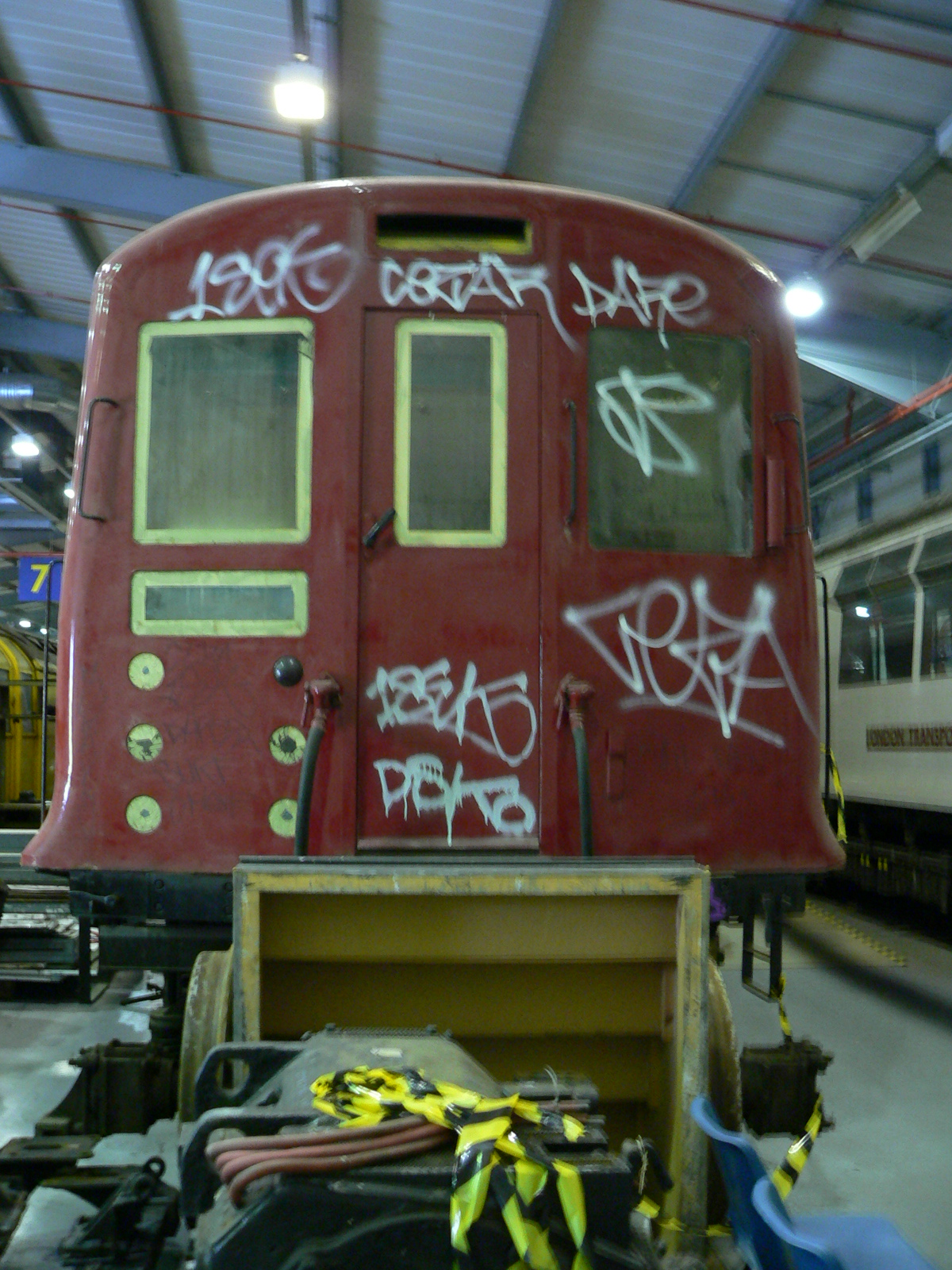
- The graffiti covered front end of a Q38 Stock driving motor car at London Transport Museum Depot
- Stock type: Subsurface
- In service: 1939-1971
- Manufacturer: Gloucester RC&W

The Q Stock consisted of various District line trains, built from 1923 (G Stock) until the mid-1930s, originally built with manually operated sliding doors. Following conversion to air operated doors, the trains became collectively known as Q Stock. Given that five different types of rolling stock were converted to Q Stock, the resulting hybrid trains looked bizarre - with the older carriages having flat sides and clerestory roofs, whilst the Q38 had flared sides at floor level.

== Q38 Stock ==
The Q38 Stock, designed by LT's Chief Mechanical Engineer, William Graff-Baker, was built in 1939 for the District line by Gloucester RC&W to operate with the older, converted cars. The units had a similar profile to the Metropolitan line O/P Stock built in 1935 and to the R47 Stock, R49 Stock, and R59 Stock built between 1949 and 1959.

The Q38 stock consisted of 25 driving motor cars and 183 trailers. Motor cars were numbered in the District line 4xxx series whilst the trailer cars were numbered with the O and P stock trailers.

The Q38 trailers first entered service on the District Line 14 November 1938, and the motor cars (with some trailers) on the Metropolitan Line on 27 March 1939. With the introduction of the P stock on the Metropolitan Line from 17 July 1939, the Q stock trains were redeployed on the District Line, a process which had been completed by the end of November 1939.

== Numbers ==
'A' DM	'D' DM	'A' T	'D' T
4402 - 4420 (even)	4409 - 4437 (odd)	013102 - 013192	014101 - 014192

== Conversions ==
After the war, 132 of the trailer cars were rebuilt for use with the R Stock, being converted into Driving Motor cars and reclassified R38 Stock. The conversion to R stock was helped by the fact that one end was designed to be easily convertible to a driving cab, including the provision of driver's cab doors.

In 1959/60, 17 Q38 trailers were converted for use as trailers with the CO / CP Stock. This was in connection with the conversion of Circle Line trains from five to six cars in length. A further eight were converted when the A62 stock displaced the P stock on the Metropolitan Line, with the P stock being transferred to the District Line.

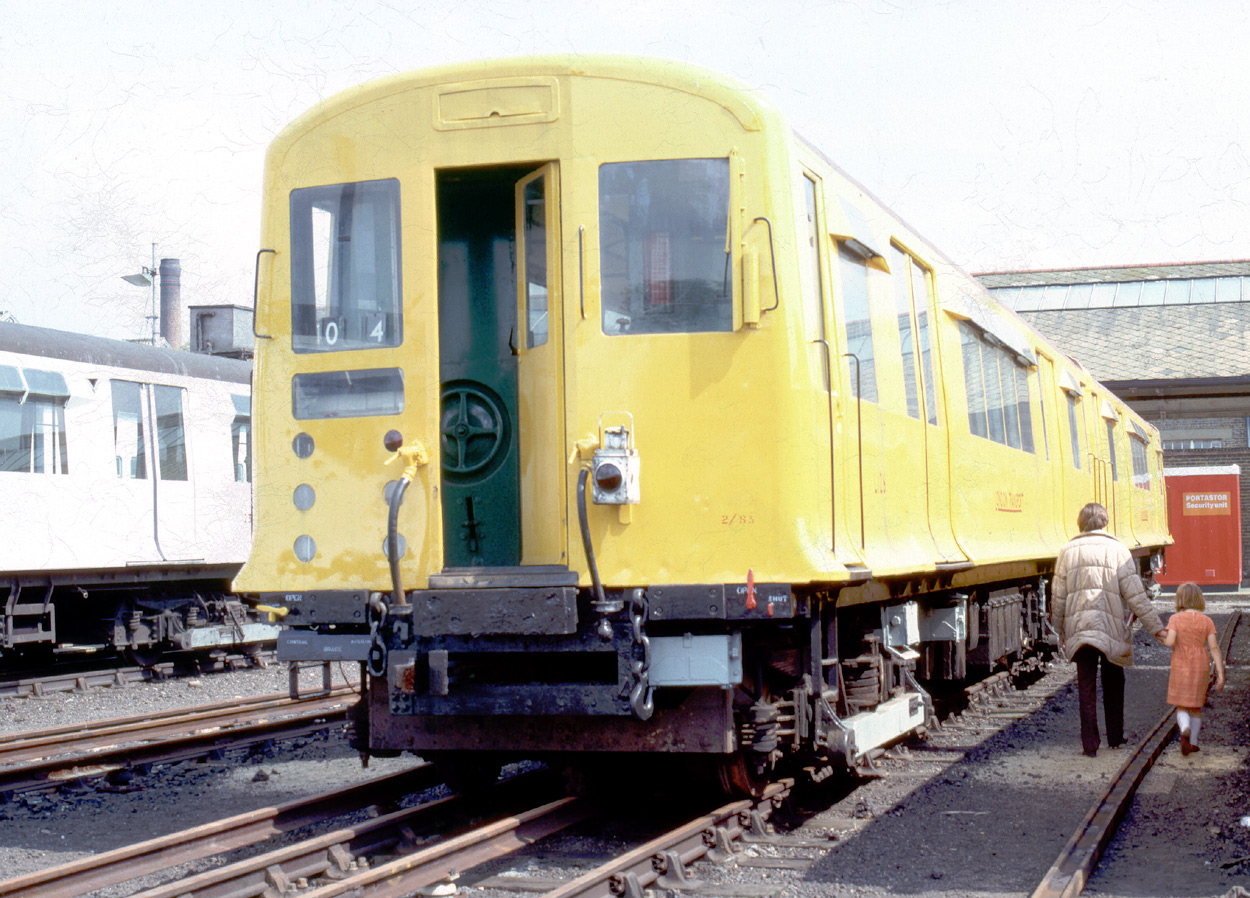
Q38 stock in yellow works livery at Acton Works open day, 1983.

== Withdrawal ==
In the final years of service, Q Stock units were used on the East London Line, before withdrawal in 1971. The Q Stock was replaced on the District Line by CO/CP Stock displaced from the Circle Line and Hammersmith & City Line by the introduction of C69 Stock.

Two driving motors have been preserved:

- DM no. 4416 - London Transport Museum, Acton
- DM no. 4417 - London Transport Museum, Acton

== See also ==
- G series (Toronto subway) - influenced by the Q38 design and built by same builder
