= Presflo =

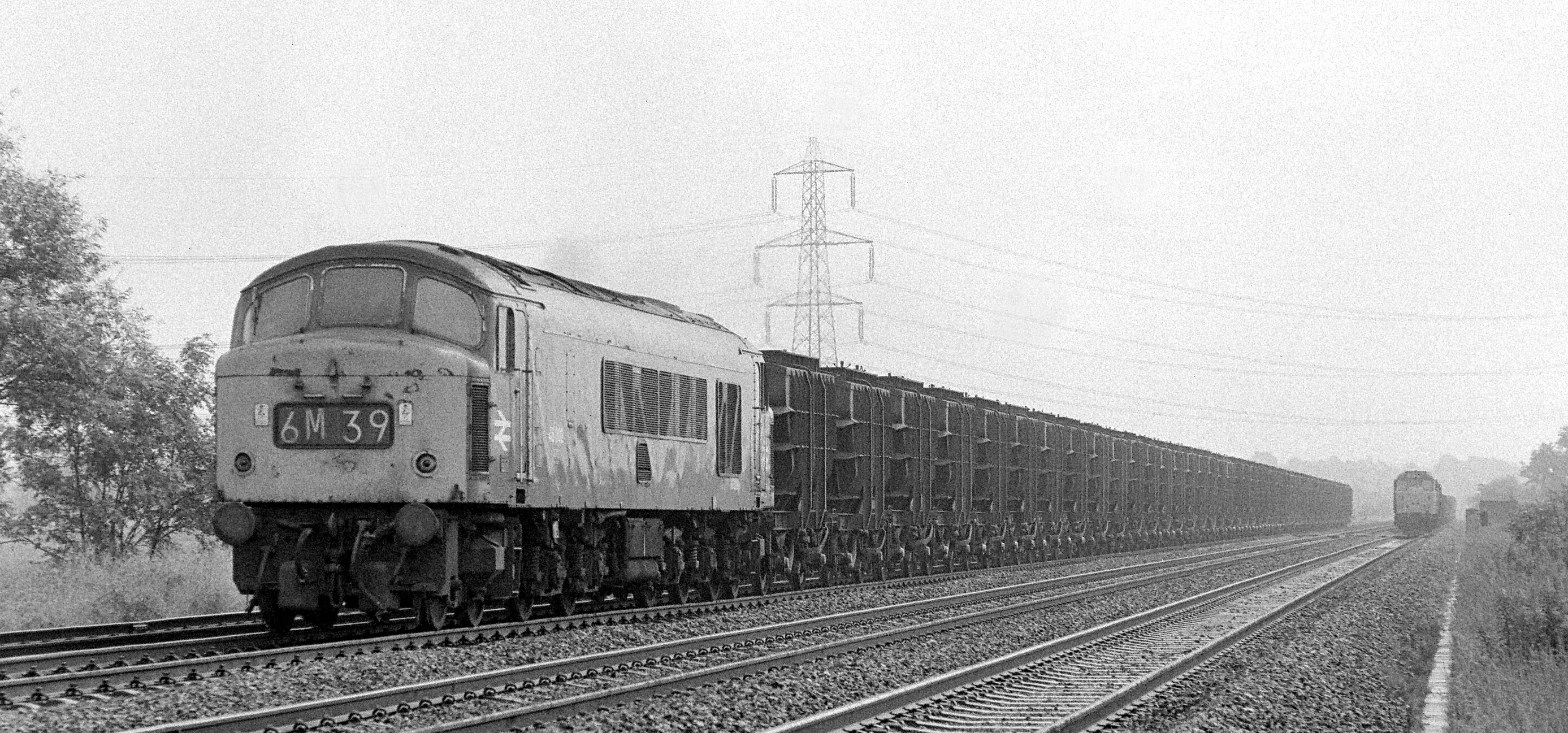
46002 hauling Presflo wagons south of Loughborough

Presflo and Prestwin were the designation for two types of goods wagon designed by British Railways in the 1950s for the carriage of powdered goods. The Presflo design was specifically for carriage of powdered cement but wagons to this design were subsequently used to transport other powdered commodities. The later Prestwin wagons were designed to overcome problems encountered with using the Presflo design for certain powdered commodities. Both types of wagon were loaded by gravity but unloaded using compressed air.

== Presflo ==
While the Ideal Stock Committee reviewed the existing wagon designs inherited by British Railways and recommended which pre-nationalisation designs should either be continued or developed, there were also occasions where a need was identified that could not be met by an existing wagon designs such as the need for the bulk transport of cement powder, a commodity that had previously been carried bagged in vans.

Presflo is short for Pressure flow, and the designation came about as the design of wagon features air fluidisation, a system that pumps air into the powder under pressure to loosen it and prevent clumping, thus allowing the powder to be drained from the wagon efficiently. The distinctive external ribs were designed to strengthen the wagon to prevent it collapsing when unloading. The wagon itself was 16 feet 6 inches (5.03 m) over headstocks on a 10 feet 6 inches (3.20 m) wheelbase chassis. The wagon was not symmetrical, with both the access ladder and the discharge pipe only at one end. The total capacity of powder was 611 cubic feet (17,300 L).

The prototype Presflo wagon was built to BR Diagram 1/273 but all production wagons were built to diagram 1/272. A total of 1840 Presflo wagons were constructed to diagram 1/272 with the following numbers: (Note: Different sources quote a variety of numbers for the total number of Presflo wagons built across all diagrams)

- B888000 built by BR Shildon in 1954
- B888001-B888110 built by BR Shildon in 1955
- B888111-B888180 built by BR Shildon in 1956
- B888181-B888280 built by Metro-Cammell in 1957
- B888281-B888550 built by Metro-Cammell in 1958
- B888551-B888580 built by Metro-Cammell in 1958 - specific for ICI salt traffic and built with 2 silos
- B888581-B888880 built by Central Wagon in 1958
- B888881-B888900 built by Butterley Iron in 1958
- B887800-B887999 built by Gloucester RCW in 1958 - constructed with screw couplings and drawbars for a planned traffic flow taking Fuller's Earth to Italy via train ferries.
- B873024-B873193 built by Gloucester RCW in 1958 - built with instanter couplings
- B873200-B873369 built by Gloucester RCW in 1961 - built with Oleo buffers and ordered for Rugby Cement traffic
- B873420-B873719 built by Gloucester RCW in 1961
- B873794-B873893 built by Central Wagon in 1961

In the mid-1960s a Presflo wagon was modified to carry fly ash. The maximum load of the wagon was reduced to 17 tons and the diagram of the modified wagon was 1/281. As a result, in 1964 a further batch of 17 Ton wagons with vacuum brakes were constructed to Diagram 1/278, and these were followed by a 21 Ton variant designated ASH21, with these being built to diagram 1/279 (vacuum brakes) and diagrams 1/ 280 and 1/ 282 (air brakes). These wagons were longer than the previous Presflos and thus had a longer wheelbase and chassis. The brake arrangement was Morton brakes on one side but on the side with the discharge equipment they were fitted with clasp brakes.

BR operation of Presflo wagons ceased in 1987.

=== Traffic flows ===
Wagons operated by Tunnel Cement between Aberthaw and either Oakengates, Birmingham Curzon Street or Southampton.

Cement was conveyed from Westbury to both Exeter Central and Barnstaple for Blue Circle Industries.

A trial was carried out using Presflo wagons built to diagram 1/272 for use with powdered slate from Delabole slate quarry in north Cornwall, and as a result five wagons were lettered SLATE POWDER for this traffic. Further wagons that had previously been used for salt traffic were also used, some being branded BULK SLATE. Traffic was originally over the North Cornwall Railway from Delabole to Tonbridge, but when that line closed in 1967, the powder was taken by lorry to Wadebridge and the wagons loaded there.

During the 1970s cement was conveyed to Kishorn Yard with a Presflo wagon being attached to the rear of the Inverness to Kyle of Lochalsh passenger trains, this being used in the construction of oil rigs.

=== Accidents ===
These wagons were prone to lateral oscillation, which led to a derailment at Thirsk in July 1967, with a passenger train subsequently running into the wreckage, causing 7 fatalities and the destruction of prototype locomotive DP2.

=== Preservation ===
A Presflo wagon, originally used for cement powder traffic, has been preserved as part of the national collection. Wagon No B873368 was built in 1951 has been part of the collection of the National Railway Museum since 1986. In 2020 this wagon was on display at their Shildon location.

In addition five other Presflo wagons have been privately preserved. Examples located at the Mid-Hants Railway, Quainton Railway Society, and Llangollen Railway have been restored. A further example owned by the Darlington Railway Preservation Society was recorded as awaiting restoration in 2013, while a further example is located at the Rushden, Higham and Wellingborough Railway. All five privately preserved Presflos were built by Butterley Iron, and the single wagon in the care of the National Railway Museum was built by Gloucester Railway Carriage and Wagon. No examples built by BR Shildon works, Metro-Cammell or Central Wagon have survived.

=== Models ===
Ellis Clarke Trains have announced that they will produce several O gauge ready-to-run models of the Presflo in both bauxite and grey liveries. Also in O Gauge First Class Kits have produced a kit of one of the Presflo wagons used for fly ash, and Just Like The Real Thing have produced an O gauge kit of a diagram 1/272 Presflo.

A 00 gauge plastic kit was produced by Airfix between 1960 and 1964, and was re-released between 1975 and 1979. This kit was subsequently re-issued again by Dapol.

The first 00 gauge ready-to-run Presflo wagon was produced by Hornby Dublo. This model was subsequently sold to Wrenn and was produced by them is a variety of liveries including grey. Bachmann also produce a 00 scale model.

== Prestwin ==
Prestwin wagons were designed by British Railways and built by Gloucester Railway Carriage and Wagon Company to carry some types of powder traffic that were unsuited to the Presflo design. There were two designs; diagram 1/274 had a 10 feet 6 inches (3.20 m) wheelbase while the final 100 wagons were built to diagram 1/277 and had a longer 12 feet (3.7 m) wheelbase with larger silos although they were slightly lower as the silos were mounted between the frames rather than on top of them. The wagons were completely distinctive, with two circular powder silos. A walkway is provided to permit access to the top of the silos with a ladder on each side located between the silos.

Construction of the type started in 1960 and went on for 2 years. The wagons were numbered in four series:

- B873000-B873023 built by Metro-Cammell in 1960
- B873194-B873199 built by Metro-Cammell in 1960
- B873370-B873419 built by Gloucester RCW in 1961
- B873720-B873770 built by Gloucester RCW in 1962

The whole fleet of wagons were originally painted in bauxite although some were later repainted in a dark grey/black.

Prestwin wagons ceased to be used in the 1980s.

=== Traffic flows ===
From 1972 Prestwins were used to convey Dried Hydrate of Alumina from Burtisland to Welwyn Garden City.

Sodium tripolyphosphate from Albright and Wilson at Corkickle to Unilever facilities at both Port Sunlight and Warrington, and to Procter & Gamble at West Thurrock.

Lime from Hindlow

Sand from Oakamoor to Port Sunlight

Soda ash from Northwich

Alumina hydrate from Rogerstone to Newport.

Trials were carried out to use the Prestwin design for carrying slag, China clay, Fuller's earth, ground limestone, Ground silica, Salt, Soda ash, Starch, and Slate powder.

=== Models ===
Between 1978 and 1982 Hornby produced a ready-to-run model of the Prestwin in bauxite. A total of 67000 were made.

Airfix produced a 00 gauge kit of the diagram 1/277 version of the Prestwin, which later passed to Dapol.

Lima produced an HO model in the 1970s which was marketed as a Prestwin. The colours were fictional and the design of the wagon itself, while bearing a general resemblance to the BR Prestwin, had several major differences, most notably the silhouette.

Bachmann planned to release a ready-to-run OO gauge model in 2019, however later announced that the model had been deferred.

Clark Railworks sell a ready-to-run Prestwin in 4mm scale.
