= British Rail Universal Trolley Equipment =

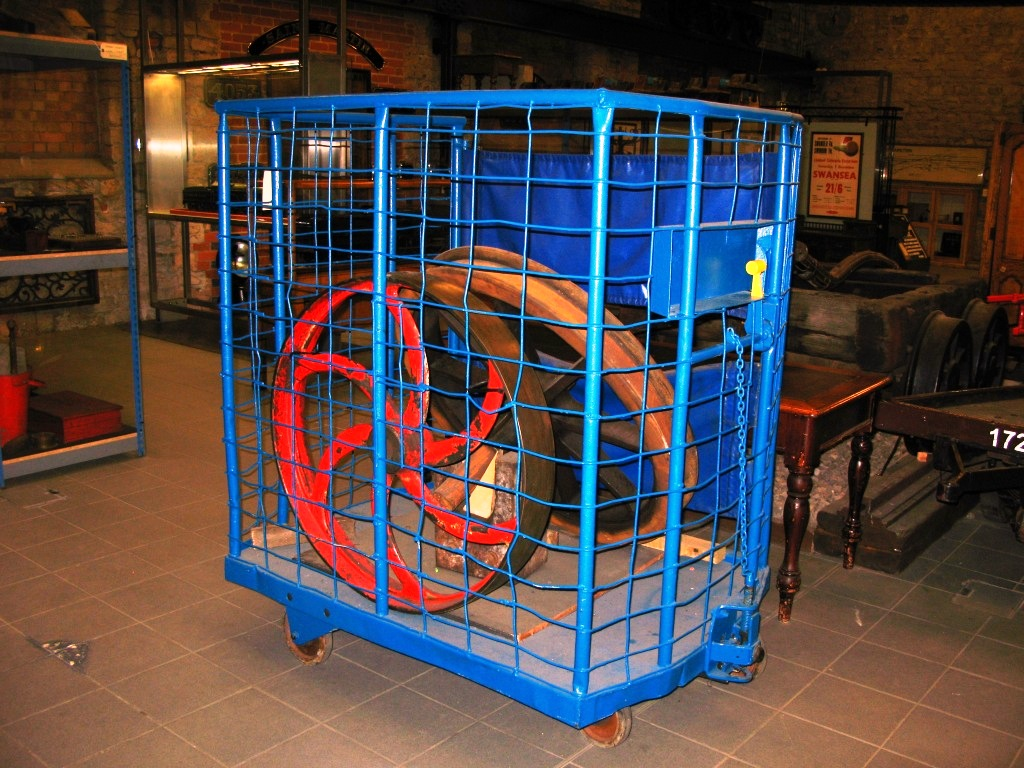
A preserved BRUTE at the Museum of the Great Western Railway

British Rail Universal Trolley Equipment (BRUTEs) were trolleys used from 1964 until 1999 for sorting, handling and transport by rail of parcels, newspapers, etc.

== Description ==
BRUTEs were a wheeled platform, generally with mesh around three sides of the body, the fourth side being open with canvas (or later plastic) straps for restraint of the load. The front included a panel for notes to be chalked to help sort traffic. A few BRUTEs had just the front, for carrying bulky loads too big for the cage, or two hinged ramps (no sides) to load or unload BRUTEs into railway vans. Each BRUTE had two fixed wheels at the rear and two swivelling caster wheels at the front, with polyurethane tyres and taper bearings. Coupling were at front and rear, the front being a pin, the rear a hinged loop on a sprung shaft. A lever on the front operated brakes on the rear wheels and lifted the coupling pin.

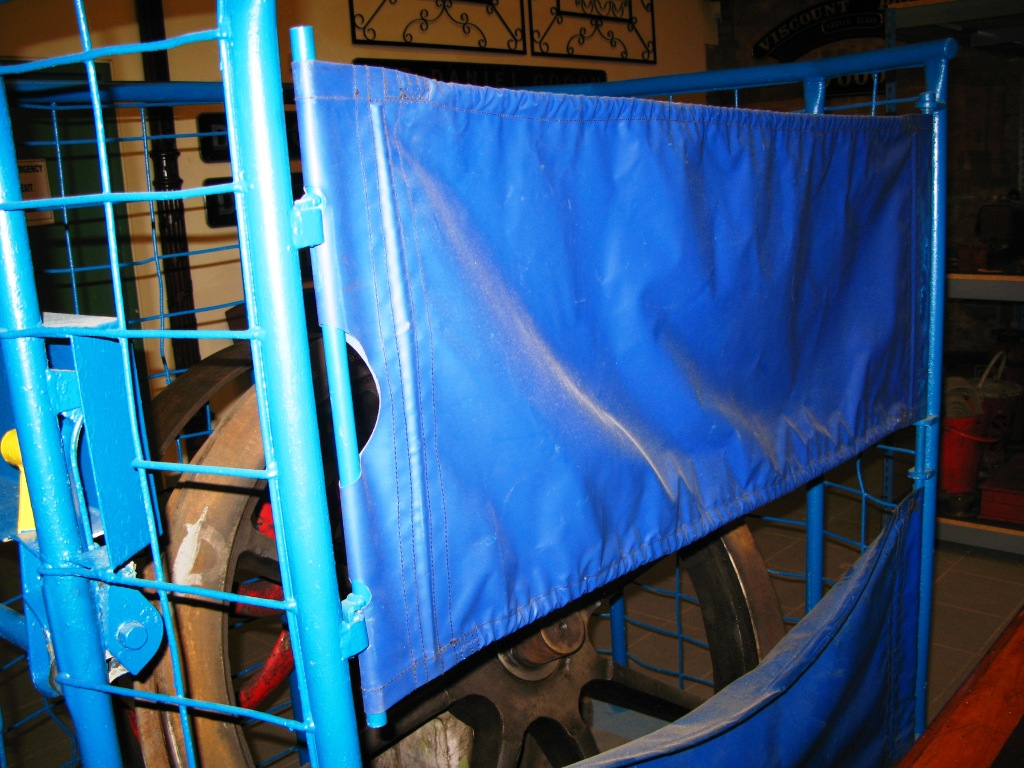
Straps to keep the load in

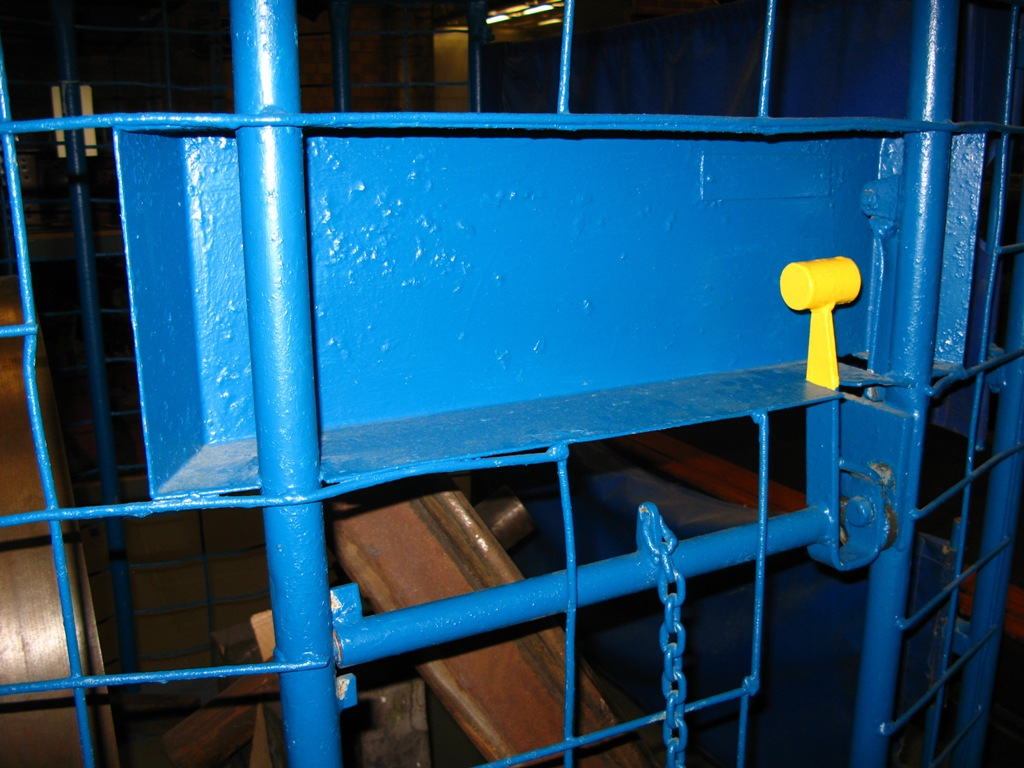
Yellow-painted brake handle and chalk panel

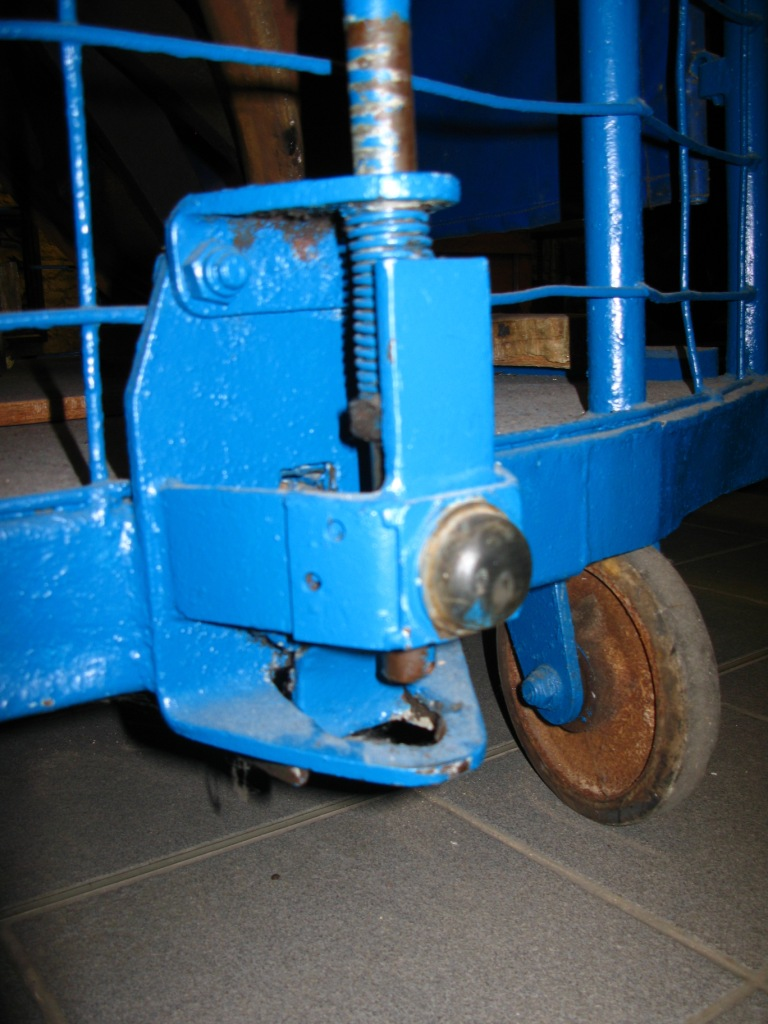
Front coupling pin and a caster

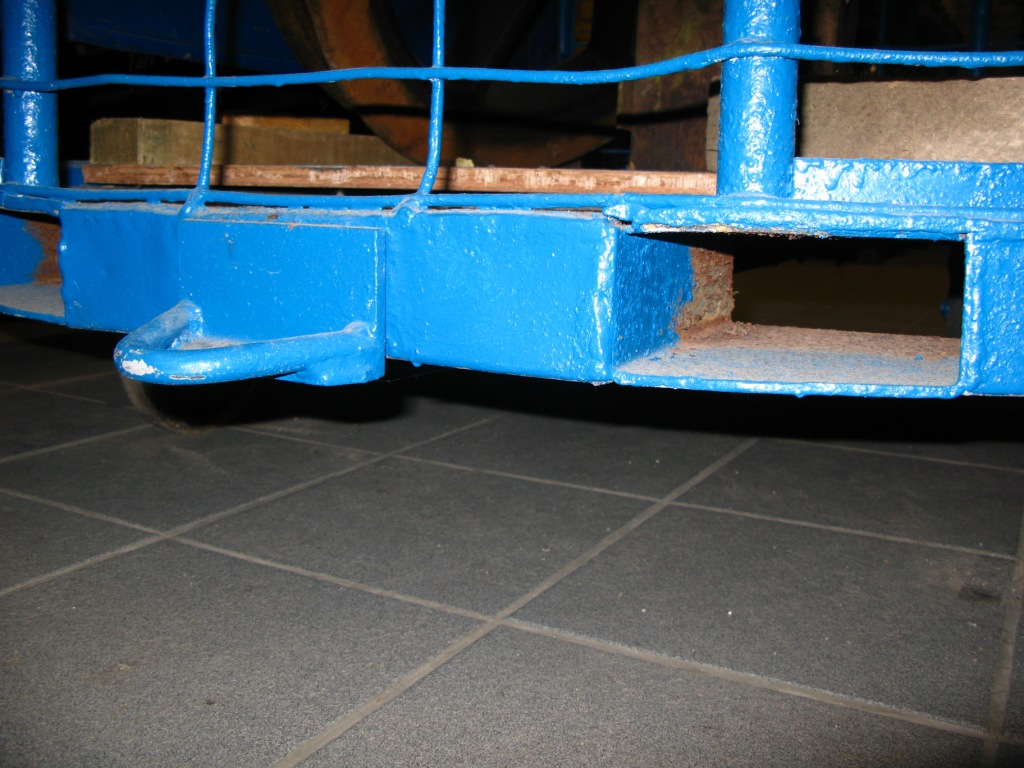
Rear coupling loop and a fork-lift pocket

== History ==
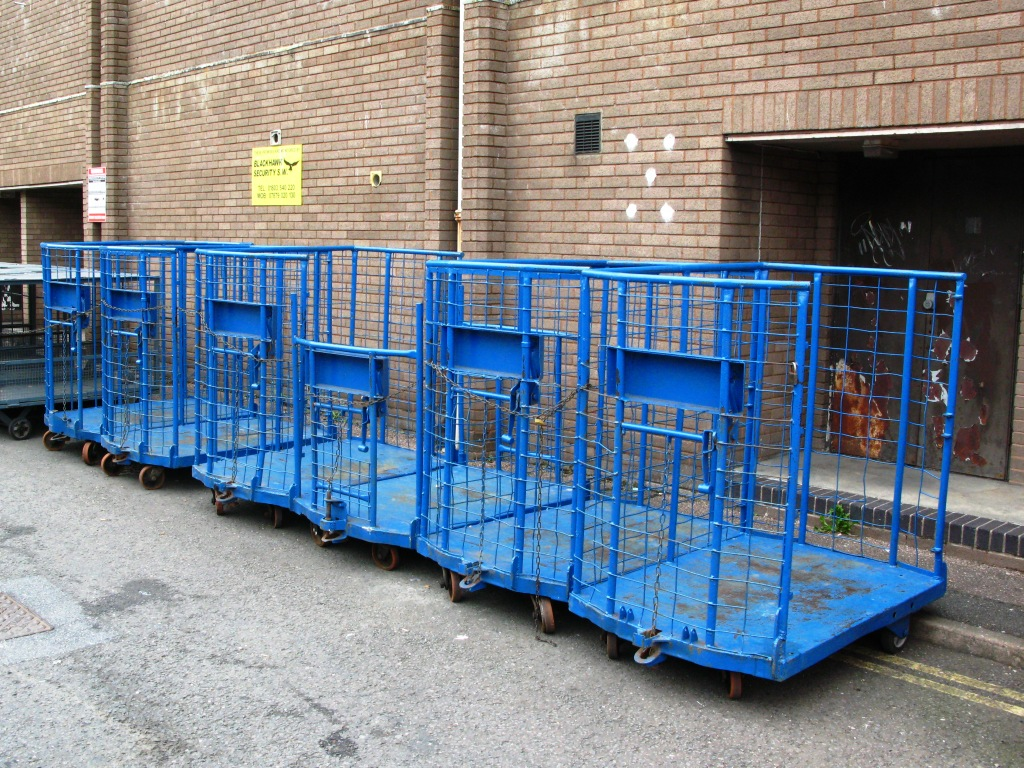
A number of BRUTEs sold for further use at Newton Abbot; none retain their straps. The third from the right is an example of the special type with a front but no sides or ends.

The BRUTE was designed by the BR Materials Handling team, led by John Travers Cosgrove and supported by Gordon Holland. Their first use was on the Western Region on parcels services connecting 20 stations between Paddington, Bristol and Carmarthen. By the end of 1964, the name "British Railways Universal Trolley Equipment" and the acronym "BRUTE" were in use, by which time some 2500 were in use on the Western Region, with 2000 on order for other regions. They were fabricated on a production line at Swindon Works. In August 1964 output was 100 per week, 150 per week two months later, and 200 per week in early 1965. Forty men were employed in their production, most of whom had previously built steam locomotives. All parts were made at Swindon except for the wheels and bearings. The wheels were made by Homa Engineering.

Unlike traditional station trolleys, they were loaded each with parcels for a particular destination and wheeled into the train. This saved train waiting time and cut down on handling. They were used until the Red Star Parcels service was discontinued in 1999.

== BRUTE carriers ==
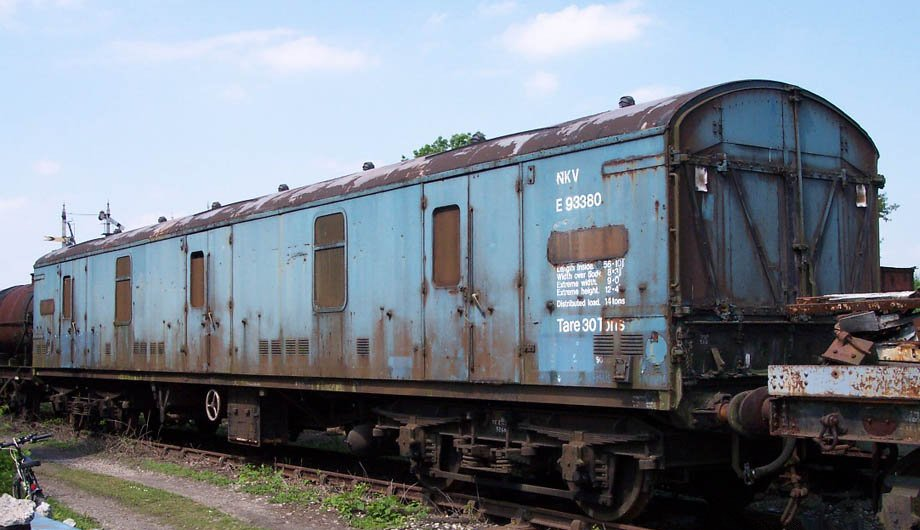
A GUV modified to carry BRUTEs – note the absence of footsteps below the doors. The yellow sticker is missing but the space where it was can be seen at the extreme right of the side, next to the two sets of ventilators.

BRUTEs could be carried in most parcels vans or passenger brake coaches with double-width doors, and several types of van were specially modified to carry them. Yellow circular 'BRUTE CIRCUIT ONLY' labels on the side identified them. When TOPS CARKND codes were introduced they had different codes from unmodified vans.

Modified bogie General Utility Vans (GUVs) had hinged beams that folded down inside the double doors to protect them from bursting open if a BRUTE hit them. The steps below the doors were removed as these were easily damaged by careless unloading. They were given TOPS CARKIND NK.

Many four-wheeled British Rail-built Covered Carriage Trucks (CCTs) were fitted with chains inside to stop BRUTEs moving during transit. They were given TOPS CARKIND NP.

Parcels Carrying Van (PCV) E85000 was constructed in 1970 as a BRUTE carrier. It was built from GRP on the underframe of corridor composite Sc15170. It was in service until 1982.
