= Gloucester Railway Carriage and Wagon Company =

Defunct British rolling stock manufacturer

GRC&WC
- Company type: Subsidiary
- Industry: Rail transport
- Founded: 1860; 166 years ago
- Defunct: 1986
- Successor: Powell Duffryn Rail
- Headquarters: Gloucester, England, UK
- Area served: Worldwide
- Products: Goods wagons Multiple units Subway cars Ambulances (during the Second Boer War and First World War); Parts of the Mulberry harbours

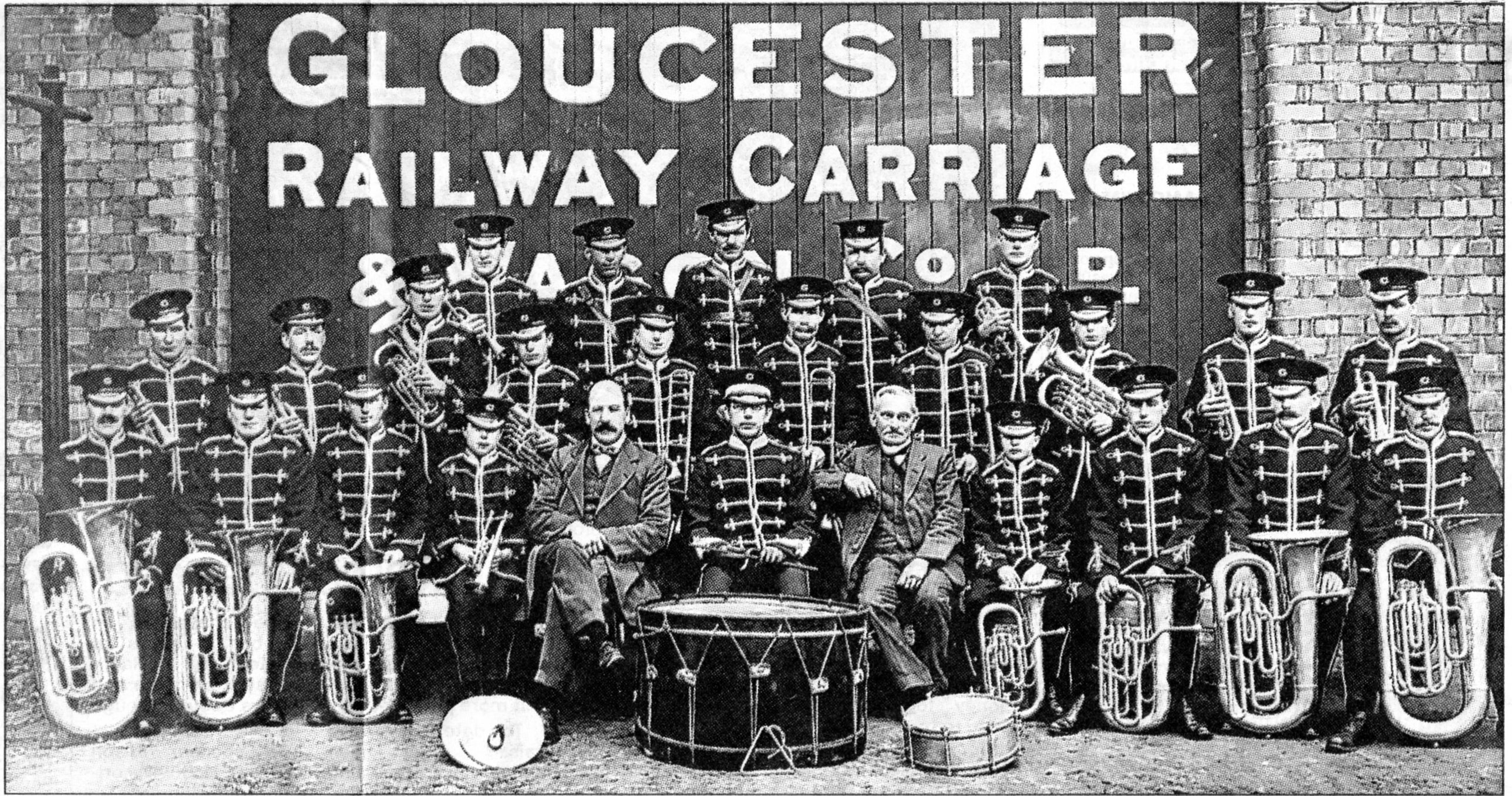
The company band in 1916.

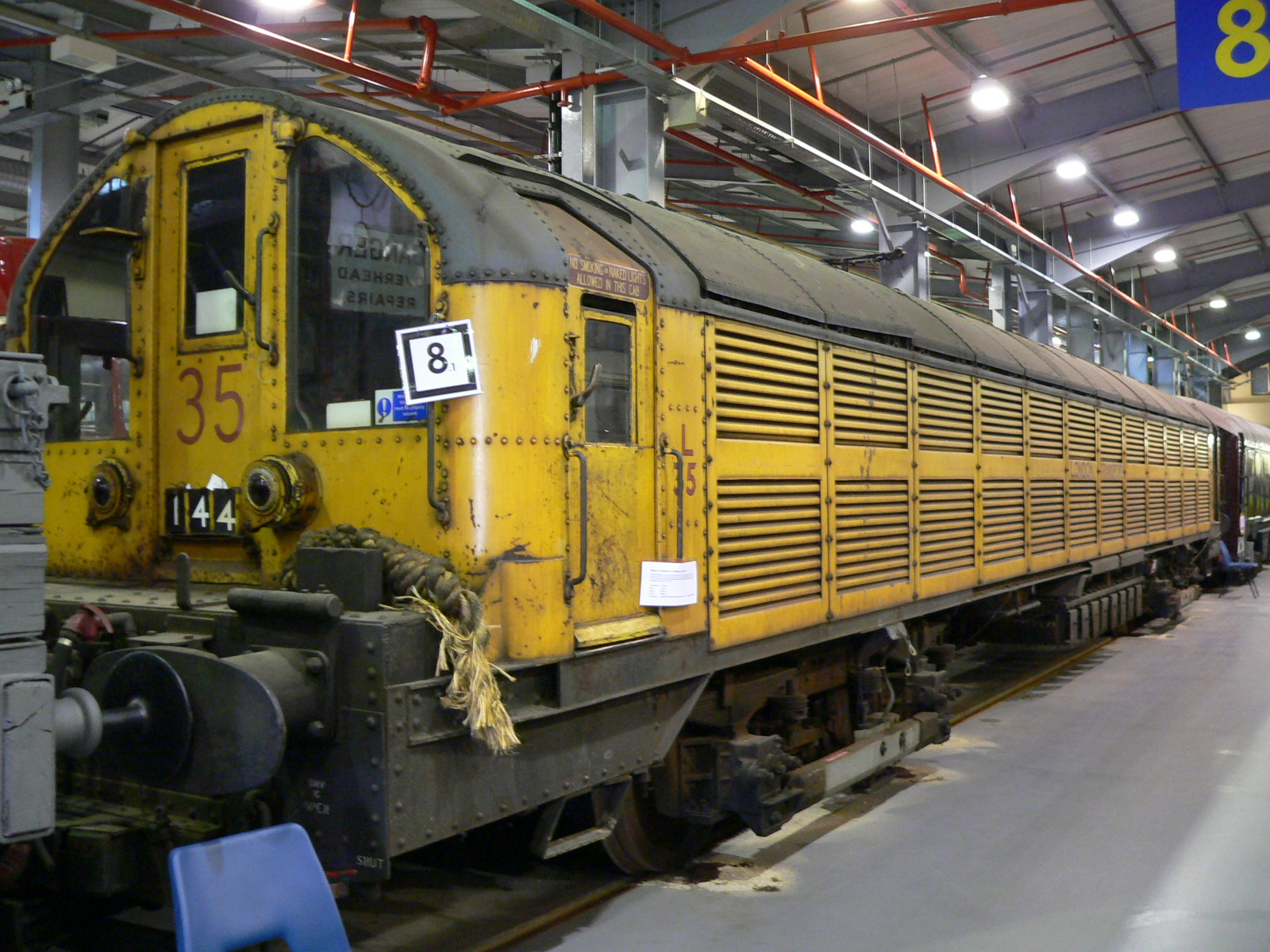
L35, a battery-electric locomotive for the London Underground built in 1938.

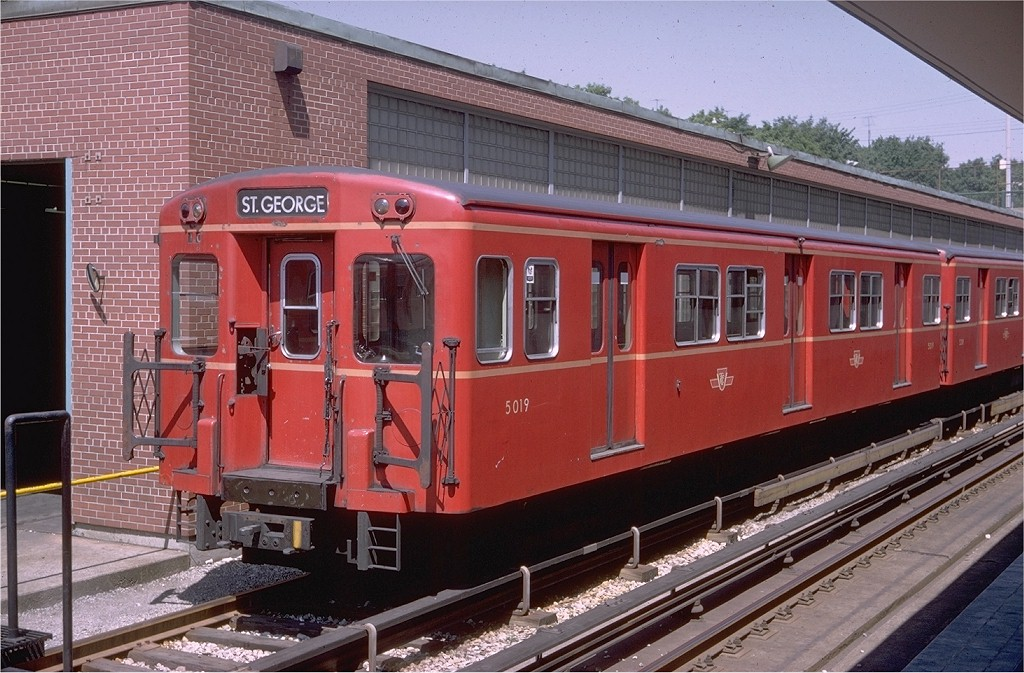
A Gloucester (G-series) subway car that operated in Toronto, Canada.

Gloucester Railway Carriage and Wagon Company (GRC&W) was a railway rolling stock manufacturer based in Gloucester, England from 1860 until 1986. Products included goods wagons, passenger coaches, diesel multiple units, electric multiple units and various special-purpose vehicles. The company supplied the original fleet of red trains for the Toronto Subway, which were based upon similar vehicles to the London Underground. The company also produced pivoting sections for the Mulberry Harbour for the British War Office 1944.

== 19th century ==
The company was formed at a meeting of 30 January 1860 with an initial capital of £100,000 in 10,000 shares of £10 each. The first general manager was Isaac Slater.

A works was established in 1860, producing over 300 wagons in the first year. Through the latter part of the 19th century, the company manufactured wagons and carriages. In 1887 it was renamed the Gloucester Railway Carriage and Wagon Company from the Gloucester Wagon Company. During the Boer War the company manufactured horse drawn ambulances, and during the First World War produced stretchers, ambulances, and shells as well as wagons.

== 20th century ==
Between the 1910s and 1930s, the company built various trains for the London Underground: starting with the E Stock for the District Railway in the 1910s, followed by the G Stock (also for the District Railway) in the 1920s, then Standard Stock trains for the Piccadilly line in the early 1930s, and O and P Stock trains for the Hammersmith & City line in the late 1930s, as well as the Q38 Stock for the District line in 1939.

The firm began manufacturing all welded wagons in 1935, as well as manufacturing the bodyshells for GWR railcars. In 1936 the firm won the contract to build a 68 feet long air-conditioned carriage for the Maharajah of Indore to be designed by a German architect and to include a kitchen, servants' quarters and a nursery. By 1937 the firm had a 28 acres (11 ha) site including a 980 kW electricity generating station, and employed 2400 people.

During World War II the company produced tank carrying wagons, shells, and other parts and equipment; by 1941 the company began producing Churchill tanks, eventually making 764 units by 1945; parts for Mulberry harbours were also made.

After the war, the company's leased wagon fleet of over 10,000 coal wagons was nationalised. Gloucester Foundry was acquired in 1950. After the war until the late 1950s the company manufactured more underground trains for London (R Stock for the District line, as well as two prototype 1956 Stock tube trains), while the same period saw the company build the original G series trains for the Toronto subway, Harris electric passenger multiple units for Victorian Railways in Australia, and diesel multiple units for the Australian Commonwealth Railways.

In 1961 the company was acquired by Wingets Ltd. (Kent), and renamed Gloucester Engineering Company Limited. After 1960 much export work was lost to foreign competitors; the company then focused on wagon bogies and suspension. The last carriage was made in 1963 and the last complete wagon in 1968. The company was acquired by Babcock Industrial and Electrical Products in 1986.

Powell Duffryn Rail acquired the remains of the company in 1986, but its operations ceased in 1993–1994.

== People associated with the company ==
- James Platt of Fielding & Platt, former director.
- Robert Blinkhorn, Gloucester businessman, former director.
- Sir Leslie Boyce, former chairman.

== Records ==
The company's records are held at the Gloucestershire Archives under reference D4791.

== Wagon Works site ==
The carriage and wagon factory was located just south of the High Orchard Wharf along Bristol Road from Baker Street (St Ann Way) to Clifton Road. The industrial site was demolished and now part of the Gloucester Quays Retail Park

== See also ==
- List of products of the Gloucester Railway Carriage and Wagon Company
