= London Underground B Stock =

British rolling stock

B Stock
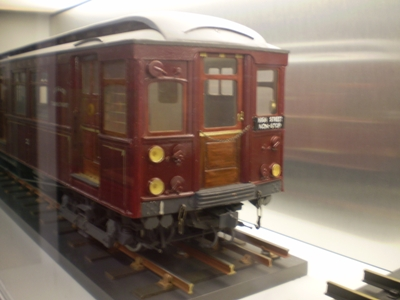
- A model of B Stock introduced in 1905
- In service: 1905–1940s
- Manufacturers: Brush; Metropolitan Amalgamated RC&W Co; Les Ateliers de Construction du Nord de la France

Specifications
- Car length: 49 ft 6 1/2 in (15.10 m)
- Width: 9 ft 3 in (2.819 m)
- Height: 12 ft 3 1/4 in (3.740 m)

The London Underground B Stock was built in 1905 for the District Railway (now the London Underground's District line). 420 vehicles were built, formed into 60 seven-car units.

== History ==
140 cars were built, divided equally between the two suppliers, in Britain by both Brush Traction and Metropolitan Amalgamated Railway Carriage and Wagon Company, with the remaining 280 built in France by Les Ateliers de Construction du Nord de la France. 192 of the cars were driving motors, thirty-two were control trailers and the remaining 196 cars were trailers.

These units were wooden-bodied and were based on the prototype A Stock.

The trailers had wooden underframes as well as wooden bodywork. This proved to be insufficiently robust, resulting in their premature withdrawal. The B Stock motor cars (with steel underframes) were therefore modified as trailers in the early 1920s, the electrical equipment being used for new G Stock motor cars.

As originally built, the B Stock cars had air-operated sliding doors. This proved to be unreliable and was quickly modified to a hand-operated system, with balancing weights. The hand-operated doors could be opened by passengers whilst a train was in motion. This potentially dangerous system remained in use on some District line trains until the late 1950s. The remaining B Stock cars were later reclassified as H Stock. Following their withdrawal (by the mid-1940s) all other remaining District line trains with hand-operated doors were designated as H Stock.

The final cars were withdrawn by the 1940s. Afterwards, at least three cars were transferred into departmental service, being used as a weed killing train. No vehicles have survived into preservation.
