= List of London Underground electric multiple units =

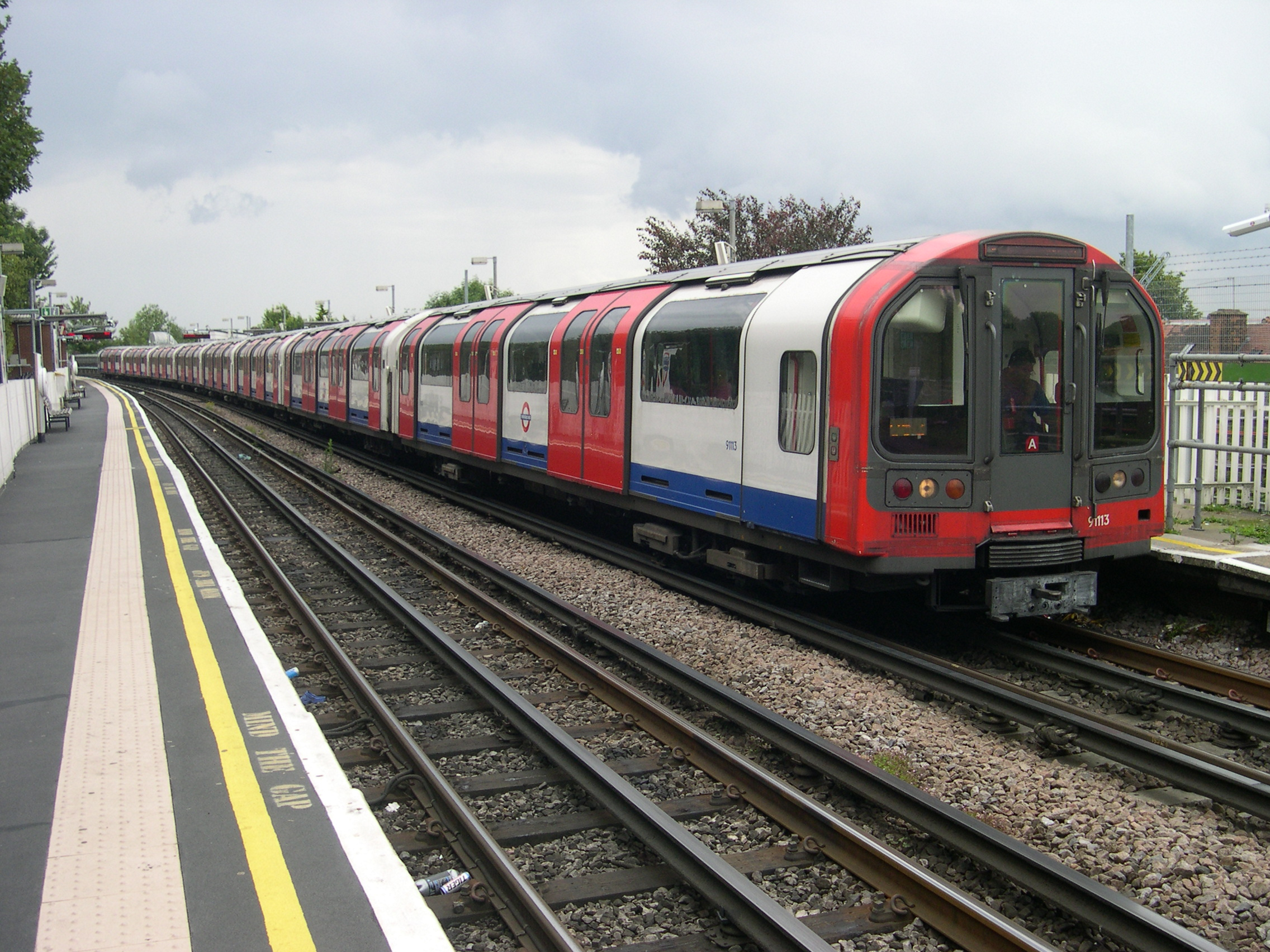
London Underground tube stock

Electric multiple units have operated on the London Underground since 1898, and exclusively since 1961. They are of two sizes, smaller deep-tube trains and larger sub-surface trains that are of a similar size to those on British main lines.

The Waterloo & City line opened in 1898 with electric multiple units, and the later tube railways followed, using trains that were known as gate stock, as access was via lattice gates at each end of each car. The earlier railways had electrified the underground sections by 1907. Pneumatic sliding doors were introduced on tube trains in 1920 and sub-surface trains in the late 1930s. Until the early 1960s an electric locomotive was exchanged for a steam locomotive on the Metropolitan line beyond Rickmansworth. The Victoria line opened in the late 1960s using Automatic Train Operation (ATO), and the last train with a guard ran in 2000.

== Sub-surface stock ==
Before 1933 the sub-surface lines were run by two companies, the District Railway and Metropolitan Railway. As the Circle line was operated jointly, they collaborated in building a prototype in 1900.

Stock	Image	Entered service	Withdrawn	Line(s)	Notes
Joint Prototype		1900	1900	District	A 6-car train, 3 cars owned by each company

=== District Railway ===
Initially District Railway cars were compatible, except for A Stock, and trains were made up from cars of any age, until the incompatible F Stock arrived in 1920. The District classified its rolling stock using letters of the alphabet in 1925, before the fleet was rebuilt, forming main line and local pools. The H Stock designation was used in 1925 for rebuilt B Stock cars and by LT in the 1930s for the remaining cars with hand-operated doors.

Stock	Introduced	Withdrawn	Notes
A Stock	1903	1925	Two prototype 7-car trains.
B Stock	1905	—	Motor cars converted into 1926 H Stock.
C Stock	1911	—	Rebuilt 1926–30, reclassified as 1938 H Stock by LT.
D Stock	1912	—	Rebuilt 1926–30, reclassified as 1938 H Stock by LT.
E Stock	1914	—	Rebuilt 1926–30, reclassified as 1938 H Stock by LT.
F Stock	1920	1963	Incompatible with the other District Railway trains, transferred to the Metropolitan line in the 1950s
G Stock	1923	1959	Converted to Q23 Stock except for the single G23 cars that operated South Acton shuttles.
H Stock	1926	1923–35	Converted B Stock cars
K Stock	1927	—	Converted to Q Stock from 1937
L Stock	1931	—	Converted to Q Stock from 1937

=== Metropolitan Railway ===
The Metropolitan Railway used both Westinghouse (BWE) and Thomson-Houston (BTH) control equipment, making the cars incompatible. Originally cars had a saloon layout, but after 1906 surplus bogie compartment carriages built in 1898 and 1900 were converted. Compartment stock was introduced on Watford services after 1927.

Class	Introduced	Withdrawn	Formation	Motor cars	Comments
V	1905	from 1936	7-car	150 BWE; 200 BTH	The original electric rolling stock, built in 1904–06.
Hammersmith & City	1906	from 1937	6-car	150 BTH	Jointly owned with the Great Western Railway. Some trains lent to the Mersey Railway 1942–45.
W	1906	by 1939	5-car to 8-car	1927/30/31	Bogie stock trailers that ran with 150 BWE motor cars before converted to run with the 200 BTH motor cars. Converted to run with motor cars from the MW pool in 1927.
M	1906	by 1939	7-car, then 8-car	200 BTH	Bogie stock conversion
N	1906	1939	6-car, then 4-car	150 BWE	Bogie stock conversion
Circle	1913/21	1950	5-car	200 BTH; 200 BWE	Refurbished after 1933, when the motors were replaced.
Hustle; S	1919/25		8-car	Experimental compartment stock with swing doors, and motor cars with electro-pneumatic control equipment	
MV	1927–29	—	7-car	1927	Compartment stock, the MV stock trailers rebuilt from carriages. Converted in 1935 and reclassified T Stock in 1938.
MW	1929–33	—	8-car	1927/30/31	Compartment stock, the MV stock trailers rebuilt from carriages. Converted in 1935 and reclassified T Stock in 1938.

=== London Transport ===
In 1933 the Metropolitan and District railways were merged with the other underground railways, tramway companies and bus operators to form the London Passenger Transport Board (LPTB), which continued the District Railway classification system.

Stock	Image	Entered service	Withdrawn	Line(s)	Notes
H Stock		—	1957	District	Second use of the designation, for District Railway trains that remained with hand-operated doors.
M/N Stock		1935	—	Hammersmith & City; District	Converted to Q Stock in 1937
O/P Stock		1937	1981	Circle, Hammersmith & City, Metropolitan, East London and District	Converted to CO/CP stock in the 1950s.
Q Stock		1938	1971	District; East London	District Railway cars built after 1923 with new Q38 cars.
R Stock		1950	1983	District	Q38 cars formed with new cars.
T Stock		1938	1962	Metropolitan	Converted from Metropolitan Railway compartment stock
A Stock		1961	2012	Metropolitan; East London	
C Stock		1970–78	2014	Circle; District; Hammersmith & City	
D Stock		1980–83	2017	District	
S Stock		2010–17	In service	Metropolitan (2010–current); Hammersmith & City (2012–current); Circle (2013–current); District (2013–current)	In service

== Great Northern & City ==
The Great Northern & City Railway (now the Northern City Line) was a tube built in the early 20th century with an internal diameter of 16 feet (4.9 m) to take main-line trains.

Stock	Entered service	Withdrawn	Line(s)	Notes
GN&C Stock	1904	1939	Northern City Line	Replaced by Standard Stock

== Tube stock ==
The deep-level tubes use smaller trains that run in two circular tunnels with a diameter of about 11 feet 8 inches (3.56 m).

Stock	Image	Entered service	Withdrawn	Line(s)	Notes
Original Waterloo & City line stock		1898	1940	Waterloo & City	
1903 Stock		1903	1939	Central	Central London Stock, with trailers rebuilt from locomotive hauled cars that entered service in 1900. Refurbished in 1926–28.
Gate Stock		1906	1930	Bakerloo, Northern, Piccadilly	Except for two cars that ran on the Aldwych branch and were scrapped in 1956.
1914 Stock		1914	circa 1935	Bakerloo	For the extension to Paddington
1915 Stock		1917		Bakerloo, Central	Motor cars, used on the Bakerloo line until replaced by Joint Stock in 1920/21. Refurbished with the rest of the Central London Stock in 1926–28.
Watford Joint Stock		1920	1930–31	Bakerloo	Jointly owned with the London & North Western Railway, and replaced by Standard Stock with air-operated doors. Three 3-car sets were modified for use by the LMSR on the Watford Junction-Rickmansworth and Croxley Green shuttles. These were withdrawn in 1939.
1919/22 Stock		1920	1938	Bakerloo, Piccadilly	First trains with air-operated doors
Standard Stock		1923	1966	Bakerloo, Central, Northern, Piccadilly, Northern City Line	Also known as pre-1938 Standard Stock trains ran on the Isle of Wight 1967–92.
1935 Stock		1935	1976		Four six-car prototypes, some with air-conditioning and stream-lining. Non-streamlined units converted into two cars in 1940
1938 Stock		1938	1988	Bakerloo, Piccadilly, Northern, Northern City Line, East London	Withdrawn in 1985, but five trains re-entered service the following year to allow stock to be converted for One Person Operation. In 1989 some trains were sold to replace Standard Stock on the Isle of Wight.
Waterloo & City 1940s stock		1940	1993	Waterloo & City	
1949 Stock		1951	1978	Bakerloo, Northern, Piccadilly	To supplement 1938 Stock
1956 Stock		1957	2000	Bakerloo, Northern, Piccadilly	Prototype trains with unpainted aluminium bodies.
1959 Stock		1959	2000	Central, Bakerloo, Northern, Piccadilly	Minor changes from 1956 Stock
1960 Stock		1960	1994	Central	Prototype motors cars that ran with converted pre-1938 Stock, then converted 1938 Stock.
1962 Stock		1962	1999	Central, Piccadilly, Northern	Compatible with 1959 Stock.
1967 Stock		1968	2009–11	Victoria	
1972 Stock		1972–75	In service	Bakerloo	
1973 Stock		1975–78	In service	Piccadilly	
1983 Stock		1984	1997–98	Jubilee	
1986 Stock		1986–87	1989	Jubilee	Prototypes
1992 Stock		1993–95	In service	Central, Waterloo & City	
1995 Stock		1997–2000	In service	Northern	
1996 Stock		1997–1998	In service	Jubilee	
2009 Stock		2009–2011	In service	Victoria	
