= District Railway electric multiple units =

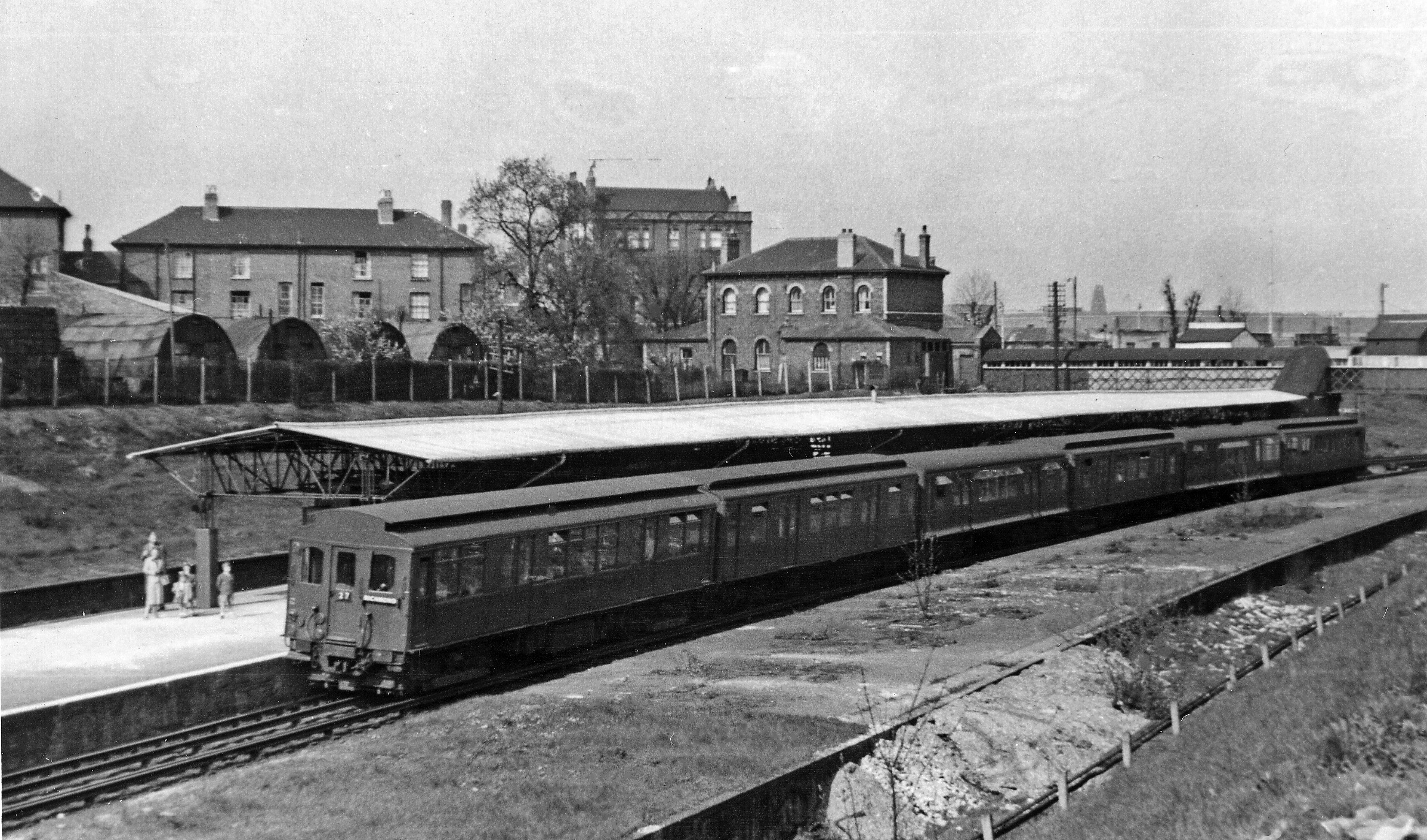
A Q Stock train in 1955 on the District line. The first car is Q23 stock; the second car is Q35 stock; the third and fifth are Q38 stock; and the fourth and sixth are Q27 stock.

District Railway electric multiple units were used on London's Metropolitan District Railway (commonly known as the District Railway) after the lines were electrified in the early 20th century.

After a joint experiment with the Metropolitan Railway with which they operated the inner circle in London, a four rail DC system was chosen. Following the testing of two prototype trains in 1903, electric multiple units were ordered to replace the steam locomotives and carriages. By the end of 1905 all passenger services used electric traction.

More cars were purchased in 1910, 1912, 1913 and 1920 to supplement an expanding railway. In 1923 steel cars were bought to replace some of the early wooden units, in 1926 further units allowed the replacement of most of the early wooden trailer units.

In 1933, the railway was amalgamated with the other London underground railway companies to form the London Passenger Transport Board. More cars were ordered to expand the service and another reconstruction programme in 1938 upgraded most of the stock to air-operated sliding doors and replace the remainder of the original wooden cars. After the second world war the units were withdrawn as the R Stock, COP Stock, A Stock and finally the C Stock replaced them.

== Origins ==
In 1903, the District tested two seven car trains on the unopened line between Ealing and South Harrow. Built by Brush Traction, one train was equipped with British Thompson-Houston (BTH) control gear and Christensen air brake, the other with control and brakes provided by Westinghouse; the BTH control and Westinghouse brake were chosen as the more reliable. The cars were 50 1/4 feet (15.3 m) long and trains formed of three cars with motors and four trailers. Driving cabs were provided at one end of leading motor cars, at the other end and at both ends of the other cars were platforms with gates. Hand operated sliding doors were centrally placed on the car sides. All cars were open saloons and only third class accommodation was provided. Some trailer cars were later supplied with driving controls and two and three car trains operated from Mill Hill Park to Hounslow and South Harrow and later Uxbridge until they were withdrawn in 1925.

== B Stock (1904–05) ==
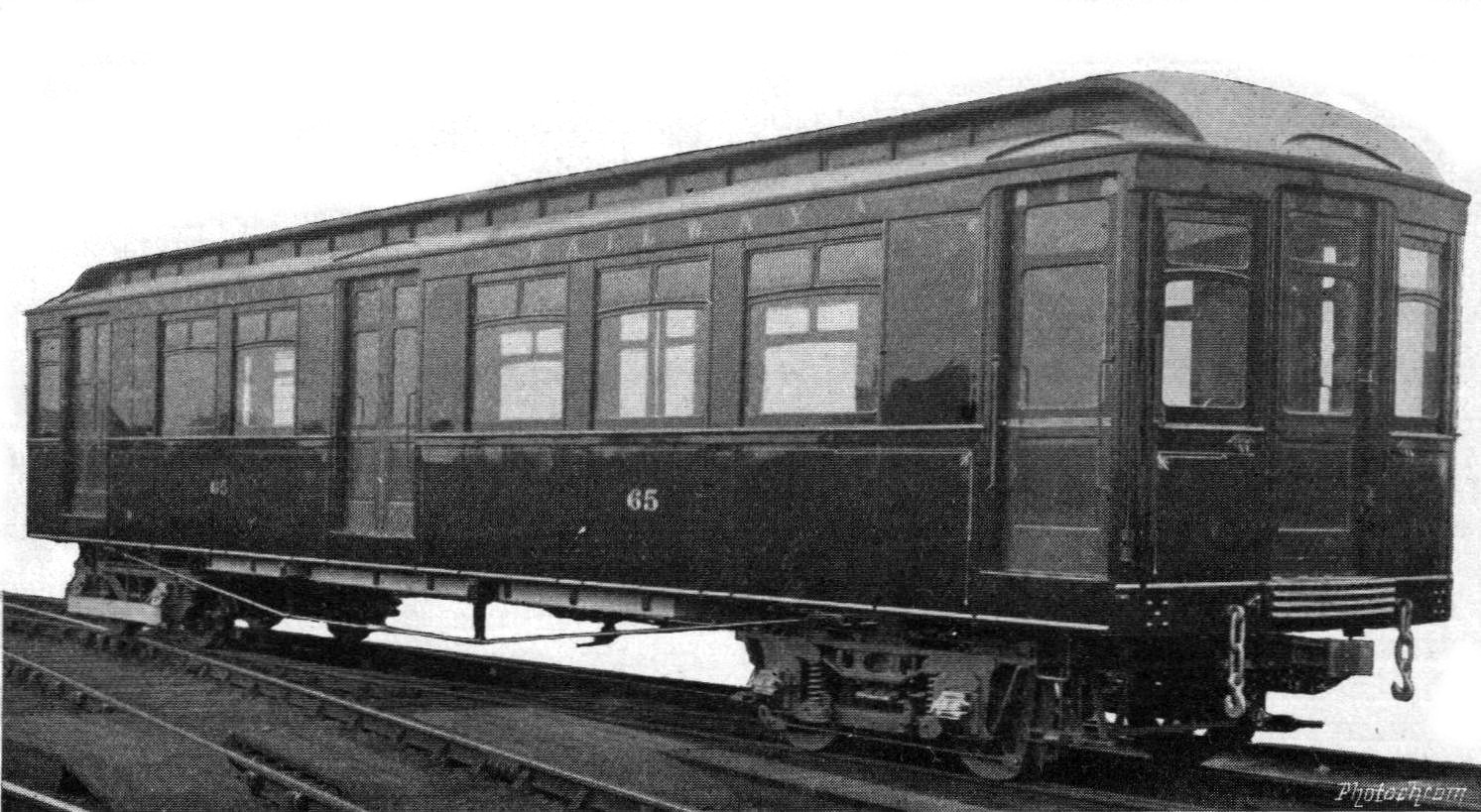
A District Railway car in a 1905 magazine

In August 1903 orders were placed for 420 cars, enough for 60 x 7-car trains, to allow the whole of the District Railway to be electrified. Brush and Metropolitan Amalgamated made 140 cars in England, the remainder were made in Belgium and France, and electrical equipment was installed on arrival at Ealing Common Works in 1905. The cars were 49 ft 6 1/2 in (15.1 m) long, 8 ft 10 1/2 in (2.71 m) wide at the cant rail and 12 ft 3 1/4 in (3.74 m) high from rail level. Access was by sliding doors, double in the centre and single at the ends. The doors were initially pneumatically controlled, but this proved unreliable, and from 1908 the doors were hand operated by the passengers. These hand-operated sliding doors were often left opened in warm weather, and passengers would open doors on moving trains in an attempt to jump on. First- and third-class accommodation was provided in open saloons, seating covered with rattan in third class and plush in first. Electric lighting was provided.

The order was made up of 192 motor cars and 228 trailers. The motor cars had wooden bodies on steel underframes and one motored bogie containing two GE69 traction motors, each rated at 200 hp (150 kW) controlled with British Thomson-Houston (BTH) equipment. Both bogies carried shoegear, that were connected together by a power bus line. One hundred and twenty end motor cars had one driving position, the remainder with two driving positions were intended for the centre of trains. Twenty end motor cars were built with luggage compartments, but these were soon replaced with seating. The trailer cars were built entirely of wood, thirty two having driving positions. The trains were fitted with the Westinghouse air brake.

From 1906 the standard formation was six cars, with an equal number of motor and trailer cars running in two or four car formation off-peak.

Fifty were replaced in 1923 by the G Stock, and in 1926 the wooden trailers were scrapped and the motor cars with metal underbodies converted into trailers, to be replaced by Q Stock in 1938.

== C, D & E Stock (1910–13) ==
By 1910 the District required additional rolling stock. The first group of cars, 32 motor cars and 20 trailers, arrived in 1911 from Hurst, Nelson & Co and because of this the whole group was known as 'Hurst Nelsons'. They were similar in appearance to the B class but were largely constructed of steel. They had different bogies to the earlier cars, but the similar electrical equipment and some of the motors were reused from electric locomotives that had recently been withdrawn.

In 1912 thirty more, 22 motor cars and 8 trailers, arrived from Metropolitan Amalgamated and were of a similar design, followed by 30 'Gloucester' cars (26 motors and 4 trailers) in 1914, with an elliptical roof instead of a clerestory.

During the 1926 reconstruction programme, these all received new WT54B motors and ran with converted 1904–5 stock. In 1938 these became part of the 'H Stock', retaining their hand-operated doors. By the 1950s a small of number of trains were used on the Olympia shuttle until they were withdrawn in 1957.

== F Stock (1920) ==
In 1920 the District look delivery of the 'F Stock' – 40 motor cars, 48 trailer cars and 12 control trailers, enough for 12 x 8 car trains in the formation M-T-T-T-M+CT-T-M, (Note: M – Motor car; T – Trailer; CT – Control Trailer; SM and DM refer to the single motored and double motored cars.) arranged so the train could divide at Acton Town with a 3-car portion going to South Harrow and a 5-car portion to Ealing. The cars had three hand-operated double sliding doors on each side and the cabs were fitted with unique elliptical windows. Nicknamed 'Tanks', these steel bodied cars were incompatible with the existing fleet, each motor car fitted with two motored bogies, each having two GE260 motors. With an acceleration of 1.5 mph/second and a design top speed of 45 mph they were considered overpowered and fourteen motor cars had the motors removed from one bogie to reduce the maximum traction current. These motors replaced the GE69 motors on the District electric locomotives.

In 1928–30 the cars were converted to use electro-pneumatic brakes and the formation changed to 7-cars DM-T-T-SM-CT-T-DM, the SM cars having only one motored bogie. After 1938 guard control air-operated doors were installed and a control trailer bogie motored with equipment from the recently scrapped electric locomotives. The formation was DM-T-T-SM-SM-T-T-DM.

In the 1950s the trains were transferred to the Metropolitan line, where they worked the semi-fast service to Harrow and Uxbridge. These were withdrawn in the early 1960s after the introduction of the A Stock, the last F Stock train to Uxbridge was on 15 March 1963. Ten 4-car units were transferred to the East London line and ran until 7 September 1963, when they were replaced by Q Stock.

== 1920s Reconstruction ==
By the 1920s the District was having to rebuild its original wooden cars and having reliability problems with the bogies fitted to the motor and trailer cars. In 1921 it was decided to purchase new motor cars taking the traction equipment from the current motor cars, converting these into trailers with new bogies.

=== G Stock (1923) ===
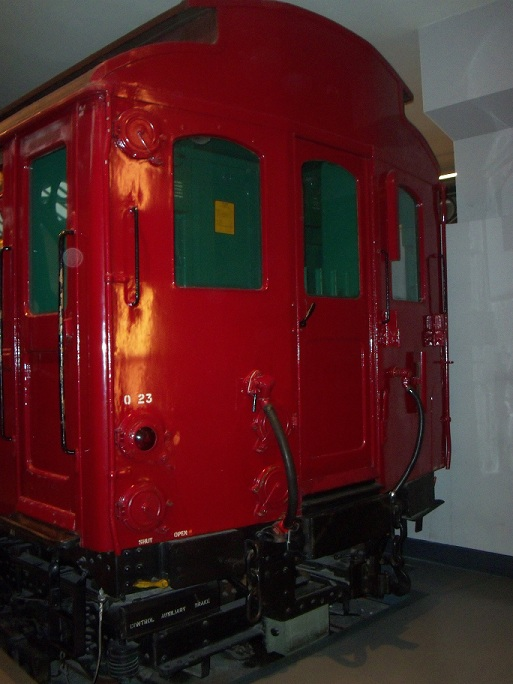
A G Stock car converted in Q23 Stock is preserved as a static exhibit at London Transport Museum at Covent Garden.

The first fifty motor cars were ordered in 1923 from Gloucester RC&W. These new bodies were similar in appearance to the older District stock but had an additional double sliding door on each side and the clerestory roof carried forward to the car ends, rather than rounded off. Forty two motor cars were converted into trailers and another eight were scrapped, the equipment removed from these cars fitted into the new bodies.

From 1939 to 1959 two G Stock cars ran as single car units on the Acton Town to South Acton shuttle. The remainder were converted into Q23 Stock in the late 1930s and withdrawn in 1962.

About this time the current stock was classified as follows:

Stock	Year	Manufacturer	Motor	Trailer	Control Trailer	Comments
B	1904-5	Brush; Metro; Ateliers	147	150	26	
C	1910	Hurst Nelson	32	20	–	
D	1912	Metro	22	8	–	
E	1914	Gloucester	26	4	–	
F	1920	Metro	40	48	12	
G	1923	Gloucester	50	–	–	
H			–	42	–	Converted 1904-5 Stock

=== K Stock (1926) ===
In 1926 101 new 'K Stock' motor cars were ordered from Birmingham RC&W along with 263 sets of BTH equipment and WT54B motors. These new motor cars had two double doors and two single doors on each side and the ends of the clerestory curved down at the end.

The stock was divided into two pools: A 'main line stock' pool composing 263 motor cars and 248 trailers. The motor cars were the 101 new motor cars, together with all the C, D, E and G Stock motor and trailers; these all received new motors. These ran with 248 trailers of the wooden B Stock, 152 of these motor cars with the motors removed. A small pool of 'local stock', 37 motor cars and 18 control trailers worked the Acton Town shuttles to South Acton, South Harrow and Hounslow. In 1930 these motor cars were fitted with GE212 motors available stock recently replaced on the Watford Joint Line.

== L, M & N Stock (1931–35) ==
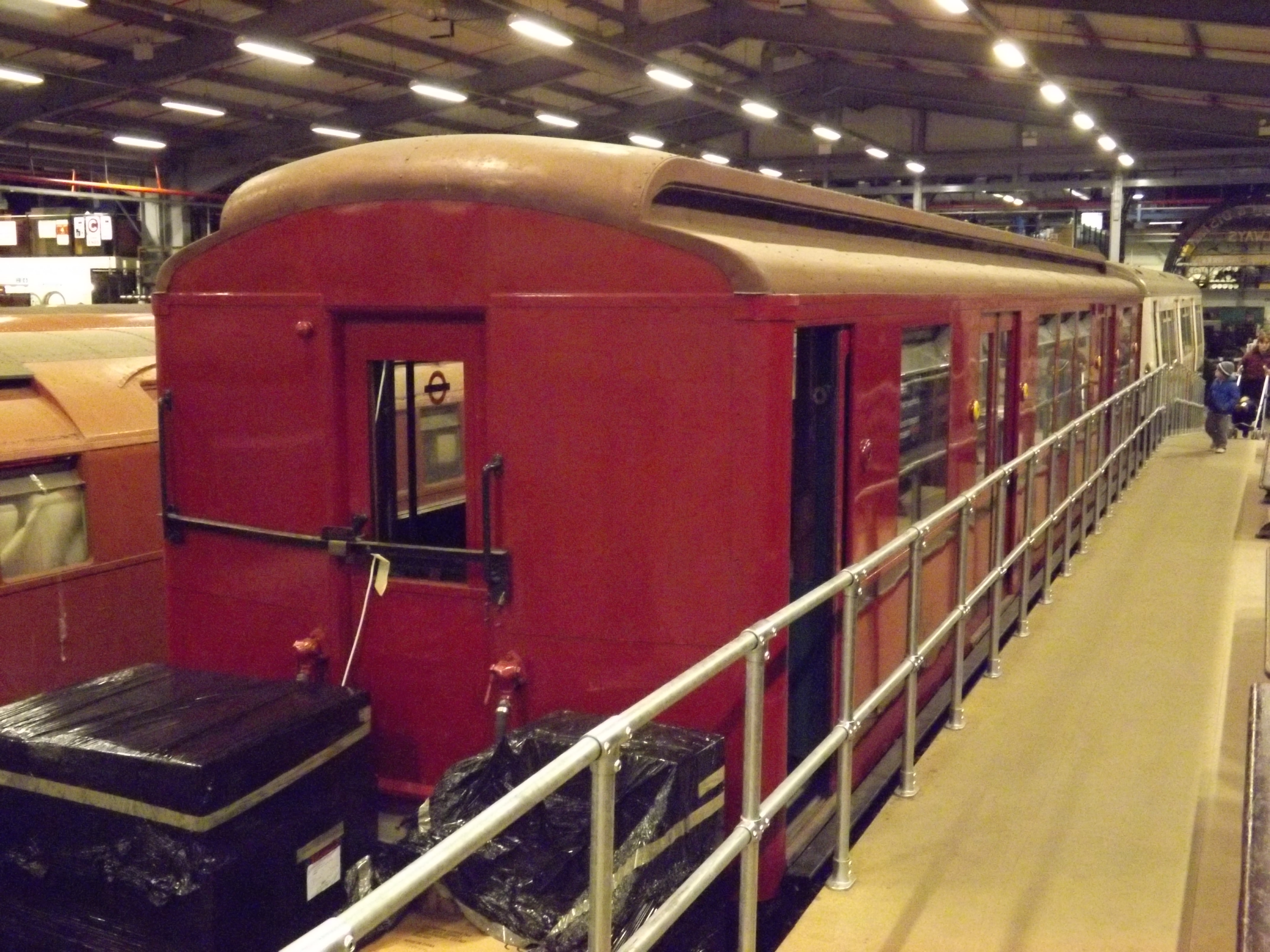
N or Q35 trailer car at Acton Depot

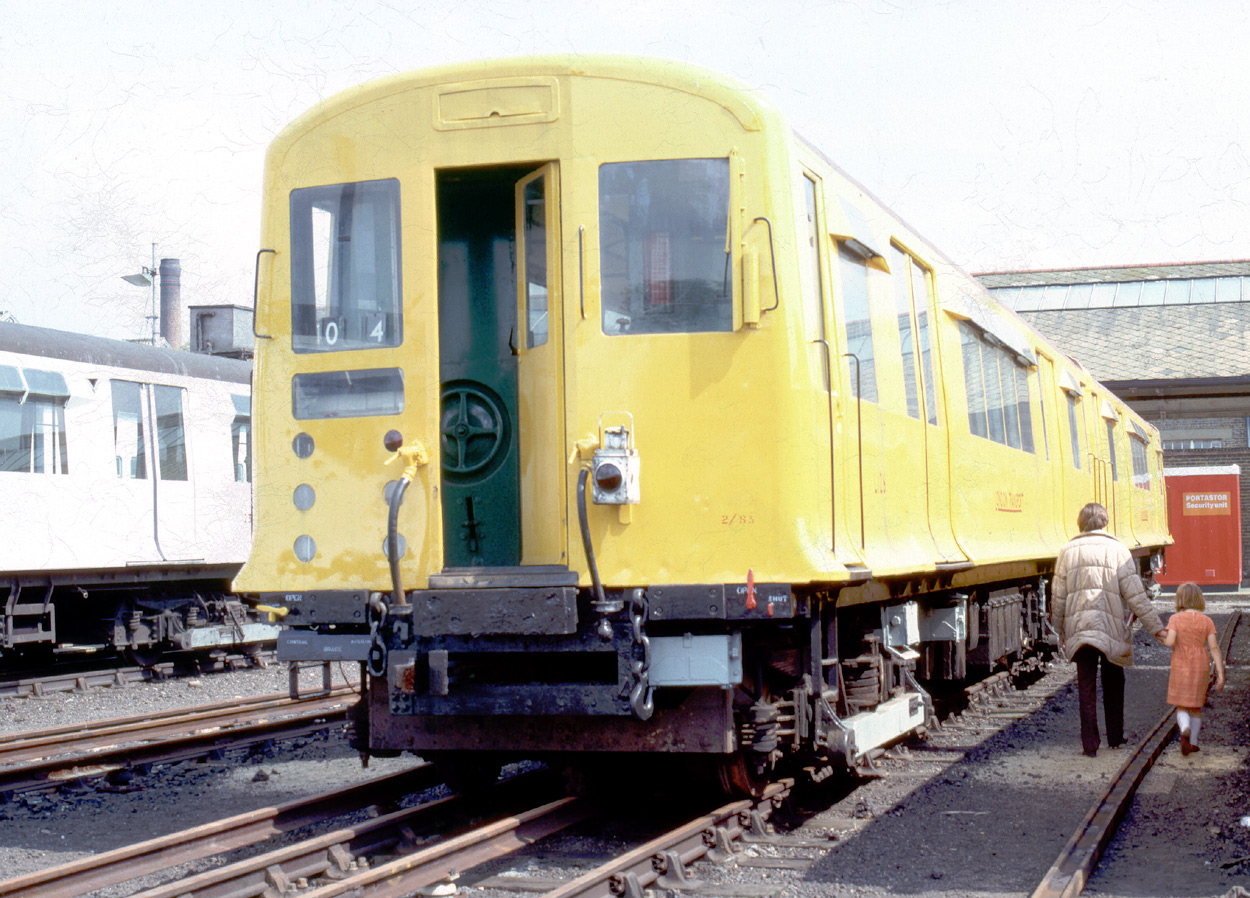
Q38 stock in yellow works livery at Acton Works open day, 1983

In 1932 the District was extending to Upminster and additional cars were needed. 'L Stock' 45 vehicles, 8 motor cars and 37 trailers, were made by the Union Construction Company, a UERL subsidiary. The traction motors on these cars, still WT54Bs, were the first with roller bearings, significantly reducing the maintenance required. After the creation of the LPTB in 1933 and the amalgamation of the District and Metropolitan Railways some of the Met trains were extended to Barking to improve the service on the route. This required more trains and, for speed, more vehicles to the same design as the 'L Stock' were ordered. 14 motor cars and 14 trailers were received from Birmingham ('M Stock') and a further 26 trailer cars from Metro-Cammell ('N Stock').

Four 'N Stock' six-car trains were experimentally fitted electro-pneumatic brakes and air-operated doors, and kept in block formation.

== New Works Programme ==
=== Q Stock ===
When the London Underground took over from the District Railway in 1933, 173 motor cars were less than fifteen years old although most of the trailer cars were of the original 'B Stock' wooden type built in 1904–05. In the 1935–40 New Works Programme the replacement of these trailer cars and upgrading the fleet with electro-pneumatic brakes and guard controlled air-operated doors was the priority.

The modern motor cars were converted and reclassified 'Q Stock', followed by their two digit year, i.e. the G, K, & L cars became the Q23, Q27, Q31, cars; M & N Stock both became Q35 Stock. 183 trailer cars and 25 new motors were purchased; these became Q38 Stock. The first Q Stock train entered service in November 1938.

Trains would be mixed formation with 6 or 8 cars. The 8-car formation was M-T-M M-T-M M-M, the 6-car running without the M-M pair. Commonly 8-car formations would detach 2 cars for off-peak running.

After World War II the first phase of R Stock took 82 of the Q38 Stock trailers and replaced these with Q31 and Q35 trailers from the 'H Stock'; some motor cars were converted to trailers. Further conversions of the Q38 into R Stock and COP Stock followed, 6 and 8 car sets being maintained by converting some of the older motor cars into trailers. The introduction of COP Stock after being replaced by A Stock on the Metropolitan line in the early 1960s and the introduction of the C Stock on the H&C and circle lines allowed most of the Q stock to be scrapped. The remaining 28 x Q38 Stock cars formed 4-car units that worked the East London line until 1971.

=== H Stock ===
The 1910–13 ('C', 'D' and 'E' Stock) motor cars were not suitable for conversion and these were placed with the 1931–35 ('M', 'L' and 'N' Stock) trailers, retaining their hand-worked doors. After the previous H Stock, the converted wooden B Stock, had been withdrawn these became known as H Stock. This was 97 x 1910–13 motor cars, 14 x 1910–13 motor cars converted to trailers and 77 x 1931–35 trailers formed into six car units as M-T-T-M-T-M, the four car unit at the west end of the train. After the second world war the older cars were withdrawn in a cascade that saw the modern 1931–35 trailers converted into Q Stock to replace Q38 trailers that were converted into R Stock. In the 1950s the remaining small of number of 'H Stock' trains were used on the Olympia shuttle until 1957 when they were withdrawn.

== Preservation ==
Several vehicles have been preserved. As of June 2012 a G or Q23 Stock driving motor is a static exhibit at London Transport Museum at Covent Garden. Four others, a G/Q23 car, a N/Q35 car and two Q38 cars, are being restored at Acton Works.

== References and Notes ==
=== Bibliography ===
- Bruce, J Graeme (1983). Steam to Silver. Capital Transport. ISBN 0-904711-45-5.
- Green, Oliver (1987). The London Underground — An illustrated history. Ian Allan. ISBN 0-7110-1720-4.
- Horne, Mike (2006). The District Line. Capital Transport. ISBN 1-85414-292-5.
- Lee, Charles E. (1956). The Metropolitan District Railway. The Oakwood Press. ASIN B0000CJGHS.
