= History of the District line =

History of a railway line in London, England

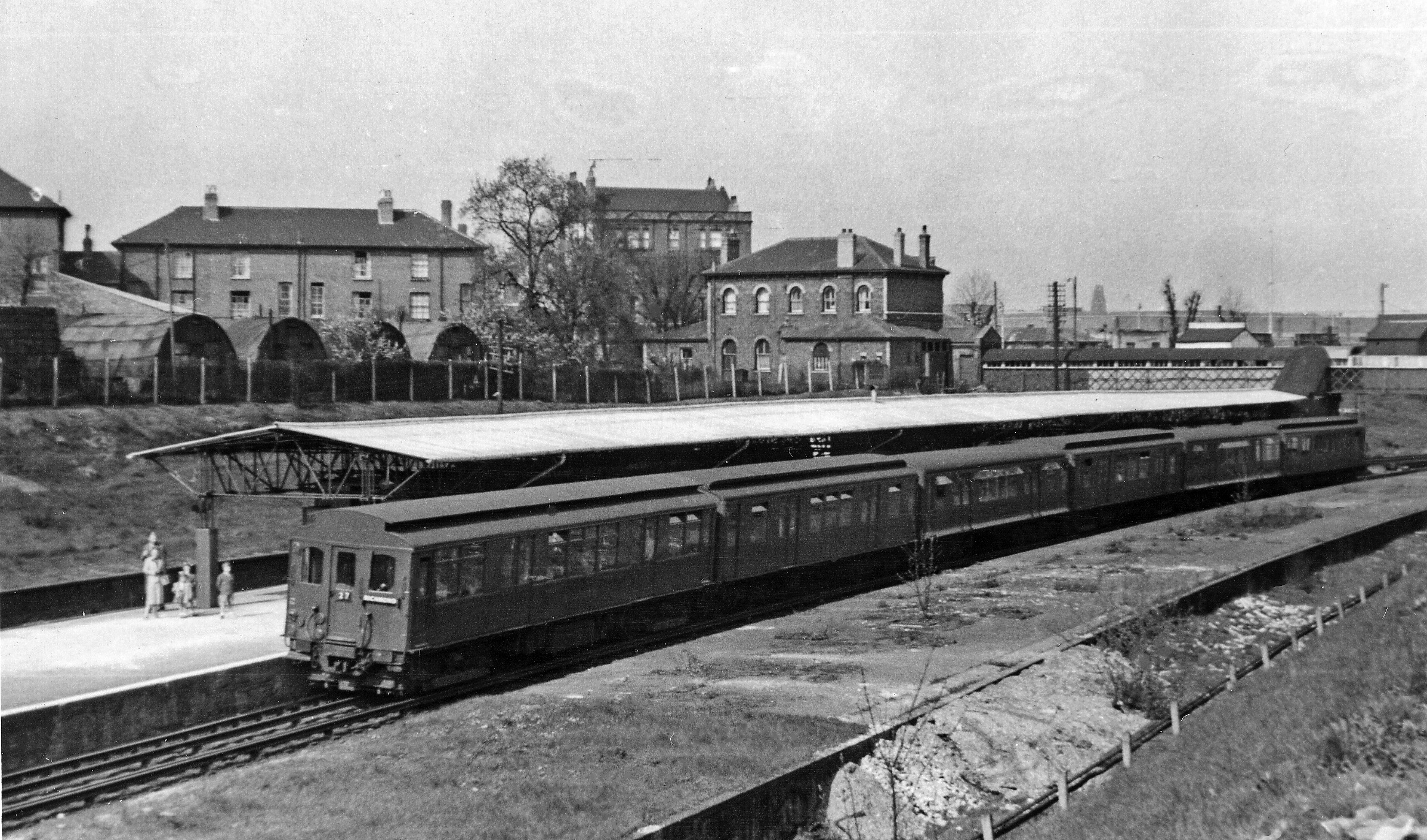
A Q Stock train on the District line at Gunnersbury in 1955

The District line started in 1864 when the Metropolitan District Railway was created to create an underground 'inner circle' connecting London's railway termini. The first part of the line opened using Metropolitan Railway gas-lit wooden carriages hauled by steam locomotives. The District introduced its own trains in 1871 and was soon extended westwards through Earl's Court to Fulham, Richmond, Ealing and Hounslow. After completing the 'inner circle' and reaching Whitechapel in 1884, it was extended to Upminster in East London in 1902. To finance electrification at the beginning of the 20th century, American financier Charles Yerkes took it over and made it part of his Underground Electric Railways Company of London (UERL) group. Electric propulsion was introduced in 1905, and by the end of the year electric multiple units operated all of the services.

On 1 July 1933, the District Railway and the other UERL railways were merged with the Metropolitan Railway and the capital's tramway and bus operators to form the London Passenger Transport Board. In the first half of the 1930s the Piccadilly line took over the Uxbridge and Hounslow branches, although a peak-hour District line service ran on the Hounslow branch until 1964. Kensington (Olympia) has been served by the District line since 1946, and a short branch to South Acton closed in 1959. The trains carried guards until one person operation was introduced in 1985.

== Metropolitan District Railway (1864–1933) ==
The Metropolitan District Railway (commonly known as the District Railway after 1871) was formed in 1864 to build and operate part an underground 'inner circle' connecting London's railway termini. The first line opened in December 1868 from South Kensington to Westminster, services being operated by the Metropolitan Railway using wooden carriages hauled by steam locomotives. By 1871, when the Metropolitan and District began operating their own trains, the railway had extended to West Brompton and a terminus at Mansion House. A curve from Earl's Court onto the West London Railway was used by the London & North Western Railway (L&NWR) for a service to Broad Street and the Great Western Railway for a service to Moorgate via Paddington. Hammersmith was reached from Earl's Court, services were extended to Richmond over the tracks of the London and South Western Railway (L&SWR) and branches reached Ealing Broadway, Hounslow and Wimbledon. As part of the project that completed the Circle line in October 1884, the District began to serve Whitechapel. Services began running to Upminster in 1902, after a link to the London, Tilbury & Southend Railway (LT&SR) had been built.

At the start of the 20th century the District was seeing increased competition from the new electric underground tube lines and trams, and the use of steam locomotives underground led to unpopular smoke-filled stations and carriages. The American Charles Yerkes, who was later to form the Underground Electric Railways of London, financed the needed electrification of the railway and the first electric services ran from Ealing to South Harrow in 1903. Electric multiple-units were introduced on other services in 1905, and East Ham became the eastern terminus. Electric locomotives were used on the L&NWR services from Mansion House to Earl's Court, and in later years exchanged for a steam locomotive on LT&SR services from Southend to Ealing Broadway at Barking.

Hounslow and Uxbridge were served by 2 or 3-car shuttles from Mill Hill Park (now Acton Town); some trains also served South Acton and central London in the peaks. Services were extended again to Barking in 1908 and Upminster in 1932. In 1932 Piccadilly line trains were extended from Hammersmith to South Harrow, taking over the District service from Acton Town to South Harrow, although the District continued to provide a shuttle from South Harrow to Uxbridge. In 1933 Piccadilly trains reached to Hounslow West, the District continuing to run services with an off-peak shuttle from South Acton to Hounslow.

== London Passenger Transport Board (1933–1947) ==
On 1 July 1933, the District Railway amalgamated with other Underground railways, tramway companies and bus operators to form the London Passenger Transport Board, and from 23 October 1933, Piccadilly line trains ran through to Uxbridge and the District line shuttle withdrawn. The District line had 173 motor cars that were less than fifteen years old, but these ran with trailer cars that were of the original wooden bodied type built in 1904–05. The 1935–40 New Works Programme saw the replacement of these trailers and the upgrading of motor cars with electro-pneumatic brakes and guard controlled air-operated doors. The first Q Stock train entered service in November 1938, trains running in mixed formation with shorter length trains running off-peak. Some of the older cars with hand-worked doors were retained, becoming known as H Stock. The off-peak District line services on the Hounslow branch were withdrawn on 29 April 1935 and South Acton served by a shuttle to Acton Town. In 1932, a double-ended B Stock motor car was adapted to run as a single car, and this was replaced by two G23 Stock cars that had been adapted for One person operation.

The outbreak of war in 1939 meant the withdrawal of the through Southend services on 1 October 1939, the electric locomotives being later scrapped. First class accommodation was withdrawn in February 1940. The London, Midland and Scottish Railway (LMS) had taken over the L&NWR railway's service from Earl's Court and by 1939 this had been cut back to an electric Earl's Court to Willesden Junction shuttle. Following bombing of the West London Line in 1940 the LMS and the Metropolitan line services over the West London Line were both suspended. This left the Olympia exhibition centre without a railway service, so after the war the Kensington Addison Road station was renamed Kensington (Olympia) and served by a District line shuttle from Earl's Court.

== Nationalisation (1947–2000) ==
London Transport's railways, along with other British railways were nationalised on 1 January 1948. R Stock, composed of new cars and the Q Stock trailers that had been built in 1938, replaced the trains with hand-operated sliding doors that remained. The new trains were built between 1949 and 1959, and after 1952 trains were constructed from aluminium, saving weight. One train was left unpainted as an experiment and considered a success, so between 1963 and 1968 trains were left unpainted or painted white or grey to match. The transfer of CO/CP Stock from the Metropolitan line in the early 1960s allowed some of the Q stock to be scrapped. The District line was overcrowded at the east end to Barking and beyond, but it was not possible to run more trains as the tracks were shared with British Rail steam passenger and goods trains to Fenchurch Street. A plan was developed in 1950 to electrify the southerly pairs of tracks with overhead lines for new British Rail trains and separate these from the District line. A flyover and a fly under were built at Barking to allow cross-platform interchange between Underground and British Rail services. British Rail required the District's land at Little Ilford, so a new depot was built at Upminster for District trains. Work began in 1955, with work on Upminster depot starting the following year. Upminster depot, able to take 34 x 8-car trains, fully opened 1 December 1958, and the work was complete in 1961. British Rail was running a full electric service from June 1962.

The South Acton shuttle was withdrawn on 28 February 1959, followed by the peak hour District line through service to Hounslow on 9 October 1964. In the 1970s the Hounslow branch became the Heathrow branch when it was extended to serve Heathrow Airport, first on 19 July 1975 to serve Hatton Cross, and then on 16 December 1977 when Heathrow Central opened. The whole District line service could not run through Aldgate East as this station was also served by Hammersmith & City trains, so some trains terminated at a bay platform at Mansion House, leaving the line east to Tower Hill overcrowded. Tower Hill station was also cramped, so the station was rebuilt with three platforms on a new site. This opened in 1967 and a year later trains reversed at the new station.

Services were operated with 6 cars off-peak and 8 cars during peak hours until 1971, when trains were reformed as fixed 7-car trains, and some 6-car trains for the Edgware Road branch. The CO/CP and R Stock were replaced in the late 1970s by new trains with unpainted aluminium bodies. A shorter train was needed on the Edgware Road branch due to the platform lengths so more of the C stock units, then already in use on the Circle and Hammersmith and City lines, were built. The rest of the District line could use longer trains and new D Stock trains were introduced between 1979 and 1983. One person operation of the trains was proposed in 1972, but due to conflict with the trade unions was not introduced on the District line until 1985.

== Transport for London (from 2000) ==
Transport for London (TfL) was created in 2000 as part of the Greater London Authority by the Greater London Authority Act 1999. Control of London Underground passed to TfL in 2003, after the infrastructure of the District line had been partly privatised in a public–private partnership, managed by the Metronet consortium. Metronet went into administration in 2007 and the local government body Transport for London took over responsibilities.
