= London Underground H Stock =

British rolling stock

H Stock
- In service: 1920s-1946
- Manufacturer: n/a

The H Stock classification has been used twice for London Underground stock.

The first time was the designation given to examples of B stock that were rebuilt in the 1920s. These were withdrawn from service between 1934 and 1946.

The second time that stock was classified H Stock (H standing for Handworked doors) was in the late 1940s. The surviving examples of C stock, D stock, and E stock were reclassified and the last of these cars remained in use until 1958.

Also included were the cars of G stock, K stock, L stock, M stock, and N stock. These cars were classified as H stock until they were rebuilt into Q stock.
