= London Underground Q Stock =

British electric rolling stock

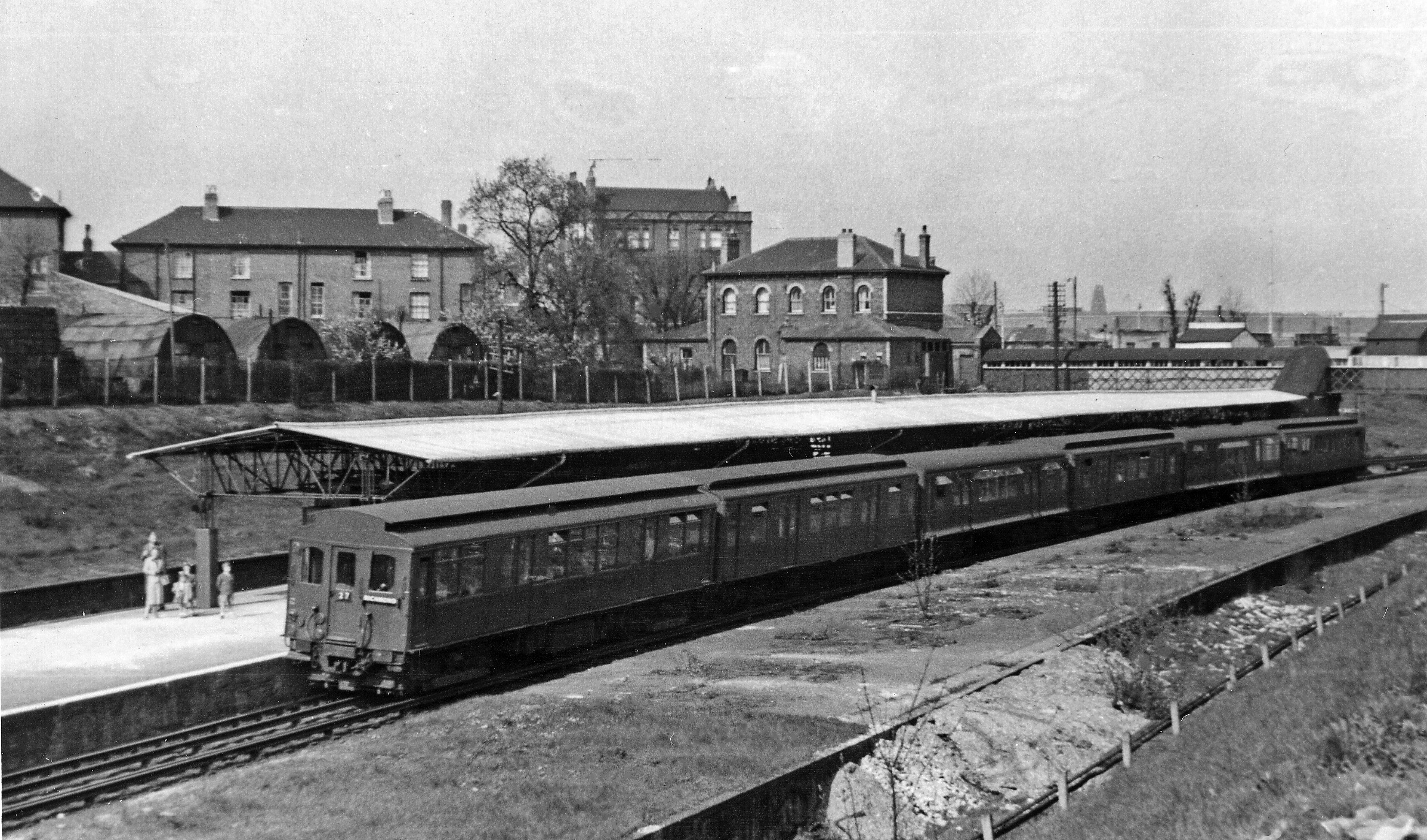
A Q stock train on the District line at Gunnersbury in 1955. The first car is Q23 stock; the second car is Q35 stock; the third and fifth are Q38 stock; and the fourth and sixth are Q27 stock.

The London Underground Q Stock were trains used on the District line of the London Underground between 1938 and 1971, and also on the East London section of the Metropolitan line between 1963 and 1971.

First introduced in 1938, these electric multiple units were formed by combining existing stock, built between 1923 and 1935, with new purpose-built cars (the 'Q38 Stock'). Trains were made up from cars of different ages with differing appearances, the older ones with clerestory roofs and the newer ones with flared sides. The older cars underwent various modifications to make them compatible with the new stock; for example, pre-1935 cars were retrofitted with electro-pneumatic brakes and guard-controlled air-operated doors.

== History ==
When the London Passenger Transport Board took over from the District Railway in 1933, it inherited the latter's rolling stock: 173 motor cars were less than fifteen years old, but most of the trailer cars were of the original 'B Stock' wooden type built in 1904–05. The replacement of these trailer cars was made a priority, as was upgrading the remaining fleet with electro-pneumatic brakes and guard-controlled air-operated doors.

As part of the 1935–40 New Works Programme, the motor cars and the more modern trailer cars were duly converted and reclassified as 'Q Stock', each individual class now being designated with 'Q' followed by its (two-digit) year of manufacture. In addition, in 1938, 25 new motor cars were purchased along with 183 new trailer cars (to replace the obsolete wooden ones); all these were designated 'Q38 Stock'. The Q38 stock cars, however, were not provided with an adequately powerful parking brake (required to be able to hold a train when stopped on an incline), so they were always used in combinations with older Q stock cars.

The first Q Stock train entered service in November 1938.

Origins of the pre-1938 Q Stock
New Designation	Original Designation	Composed of	First entered service	Manufacturer
Q23 Stock	G Stock	50 motor cars	1924–25	Gloucester Railway Carriage & Wagon Company
Q27 Stock	K Stock	101 motor cars	1928–29	Birmingham Railway Carriage & Wagon Company
Q31 Stock	L Stock	8 motor cars, 37 trailer cars	1931–32	Union Construction Company, Feltham
Q35 Stock	M Stock	14 motor cars, 14 trailer cars	1936	Birmingham Railway Carriage & Wagon Company
Q35 Stock	N Stock	26 trailer cars	1936	Metro-Cammell

=== Formations ===
Trains would be of mixed formation with shorter ones running off-peak, although sources differ as to the formations. Some detail eight-car formations of two three-car and one two-car units, whilst six-car trains ran off-peak without the two-car pair, whereas many off-peak trains were four cars in length. Furthermore, two of the Q23 motors, having been converted to enable them to be driven from either end, worked the single-car shuttle service to and from South Acton.

In later years trains were reformed into six-car formations, made up of one four-car and one two-car unit, the two-car unit being at the eastern end. Another two-car unit was sometimes added during busy times. After 1960, six- and eight-car Q stock trains remained in service on the District line but their use gradually diminished to peak hours only.

In September 1963, four-car units of Q stock began to work the East London line (in place of the 'F Stock' trains previously employed there); the trains that were transferred to the East London line had their two-car units removed and placed in store. In the late 1960s, it was decided that future working of the East London line would require four-car units of Q38 stock. To enable this, modifications would have to be made including the addition of a hand-brake. Twenty-eight cars were earmarked for upgrading, so as to provide seven four-car units; but only two units were completed, as in 1971 it became clear that there were, after all, enough CO/CP stock trains to provide a full service on the line. Nevertheless, the modified trains did enter service, that same year, marking the first time that a train entirely made up of Q38 stock had been used.

=== Withdrawal ===
Q27 Stock driving car at New Cross Gate station (on the East London Line) in 1970: the year before the Q Stock was withdrawn.

After World War II the first phase of R Stock took 82 of the Q38 Stock trailers and replaced these with Q31 and Q35 trailers from the 'H Stock'; fifteen Q35 motor cars were also converted to trailers in the late 1940s. Further conversions of the Q38 into the R Stock and O/P Stock followed, 6 and 8 car sets being maintained by converting some of the older motor cars into trailers (e.g. the eight Q31 motors were converted in 1955-56 and fourteen Q23 motors were converted in 1959). The District line South Acton branch was closed in 1959, and its two shuttle cars scrapped.

In the early 1960s, new A Stock trains began working the Metropolitan line. The CO/CP Stock trains which they replaced were then transferred to the District line, which led in turn to the gradual withdrawal of the Q stock from service on that line. Some units were transferred to the East London line, others began to be scrapped. Similarly, the introduction in 1970 of new C Stock trains on the Hammersmith & City and Circle lines led to CO/CP stock trains being transferred to both the District and the East London lines, and so the remaining Q stock trains were withdrawn from service.

The last Q stock train in regular service on the East London Line ran on 17 September 1971. The last Q stock train in passenger service on the District line ran on 24 September 1971, specially formed of a combination of Q23, Q27, Q31 and Q35 stock cars; while on Sunday 26 September the same six-car unit, billed as 'the last clerestory roofed train', undertook a special 'Farewell to the Q Stock' tour along the District, Hammersmith & City and East London lines.

After withdrawal of the Q Stock, four Q38 motors were converted to serve as pilot cars, in which guise they continued to function for several years; while Q38 cars that had been converted to R Stock continued to run until 1983.

=== Preservation and restoration ===
Driving motor car No. 4248, preserved at the London Transport Museum, holds the distinction of having been the last Q23-stock car in passenger service.

A Q23-stock driving motor is preserved on static display at the London Transport Museum in Covent Garden; having been built as 'G Stock' in 1923, before being modernised and reclassified as 'Q Stock' in 1938, it was withdrawn from service on 26 September 1971. Four more cars are stored at Acton depot: a Q23-stock driving motor, a Q35-stock trailer car, and two Q38-stock driving motor cars.

As of 2026, there is an ongoing project to restore the three surviving 1930s Q-stock cars to operational condition. The plan includes restoring each car's interior to reflect a different time in the stock's history: wartime London, post-war austerity and 1950s optimism; the latter will also 'tell a story of direct London Underground recruitment from the Caribbean'.

Preserved London Underground Q-stock cars
Type	Formerly	Car No.	'L' No.	Location
Q23	'G' Stock	4184	—	London Transport Museum Depot, Acton
Q23	'G' Stock	4248	—	London Transport Museum, Covent Garden
Q35	'N' Stock	08063	—	London Transport Museum Depot, Acton
Q38	—	4416	L126	London Transport Museum Depot, Acton
Q38	—	4417	L127	London Transport Museum Depot, Acton
