= London Underground R Stock =

British electric rolling stock

R Stock
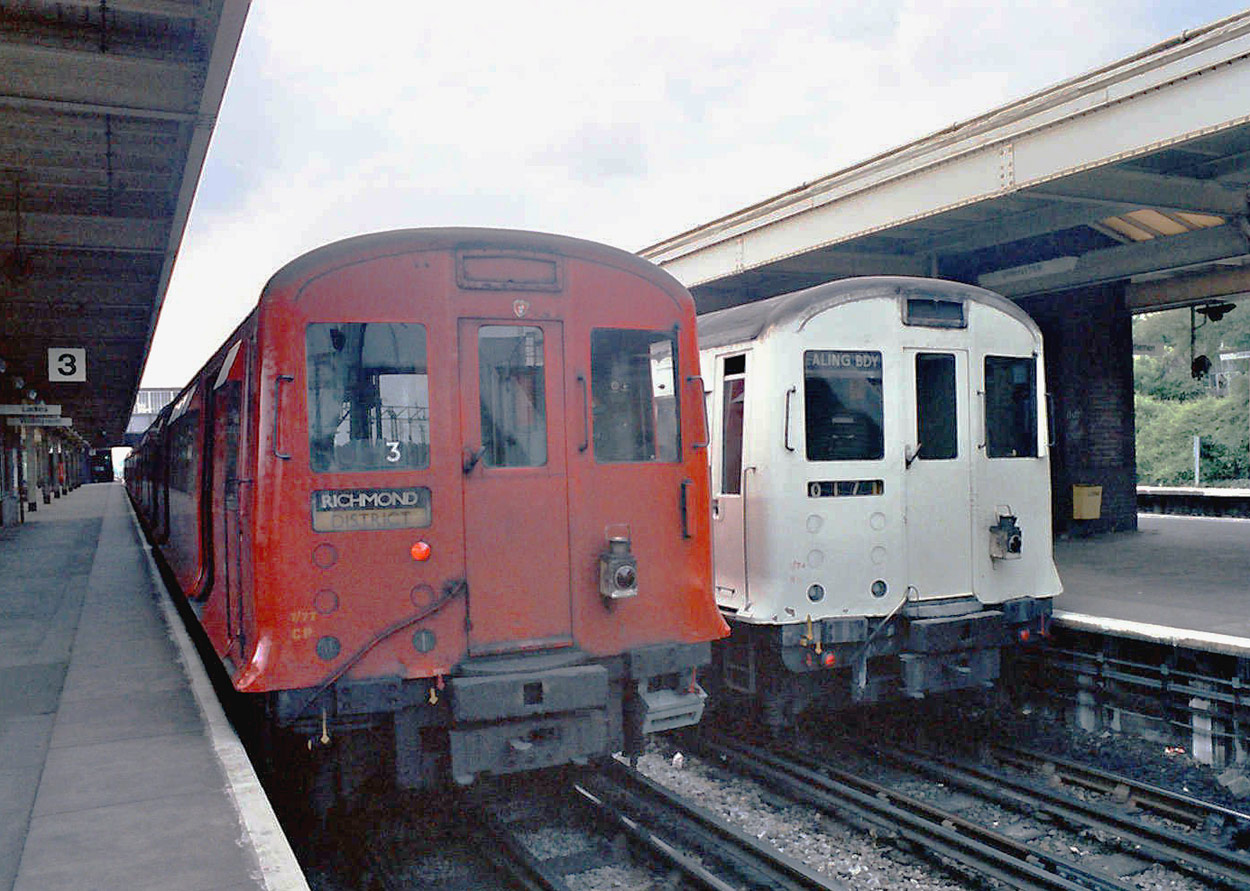
- CP (red) and R (white) stock District line trains at Upminster station
- Stock type: Surface stock
- In service: 1949–1983
- Successor: D78 Stock
- Lines served: District

Specifications
- Current collector(s): Contact shoe
- Coupling system: Wedglock between units (see text)

The London Underground R Stock electric multiple units were used on London Underground's District line from 1949 to 1983. Composed of new cars and converted Q38 Stock trailers, the cars were built and converted in three batches between 1949 and 1959. The cars were driving motors (DM) or non-driving motors (NDM), there being no unpowered trailers. The second batch, introduced in 1952, was constructed from aluminium, saving weight and one train was left unpainted as an experiment. Considered a success, trains were left unpainted or painted white or grey to match in 1963–68. Originally designed to operate in trains with six off-peak and eight cars during peak hours, the trains were reformed as fixed seven-car trains in 1971. R Stock trains were replaced by the D78 Stock and withdrawn between 1981 and 1983.

== Construction ==
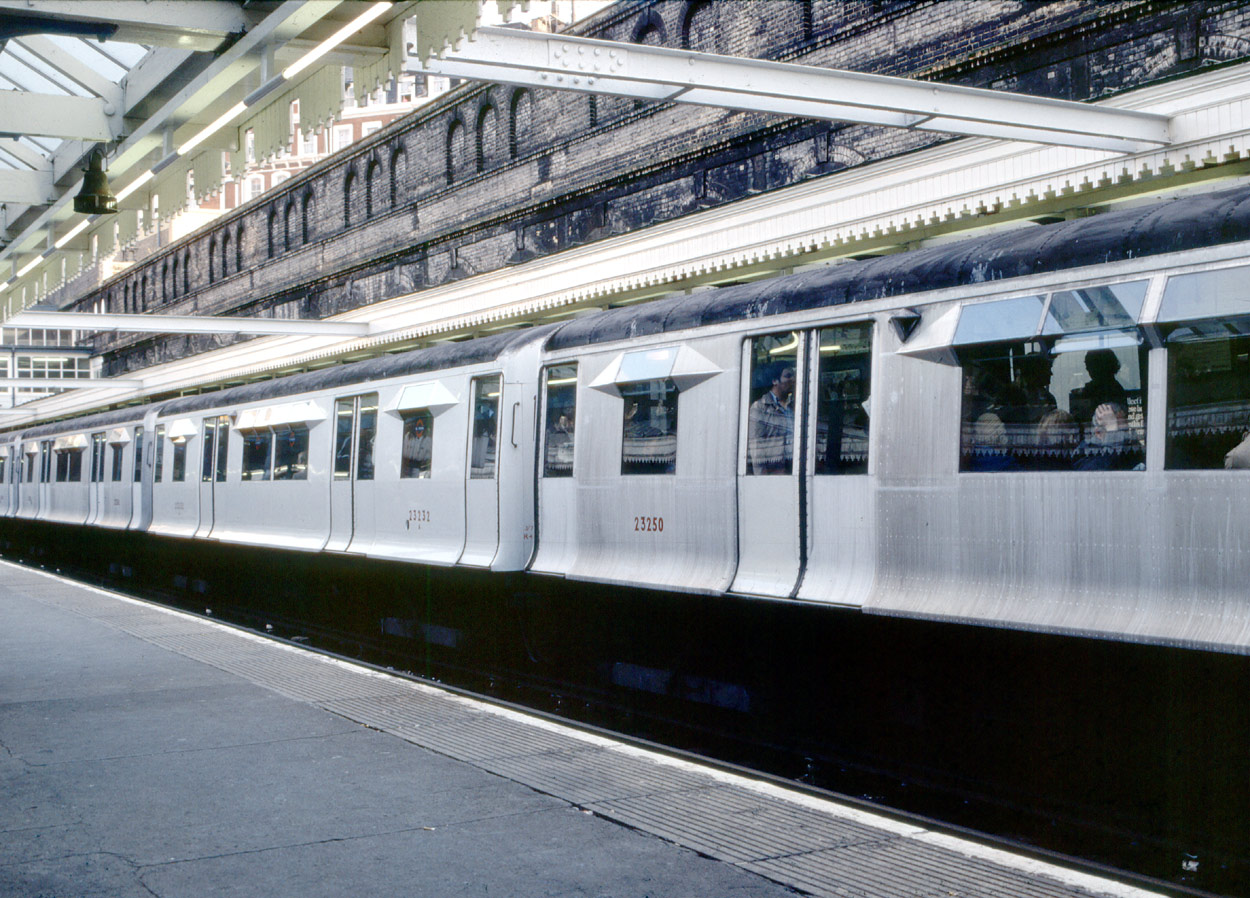
A train composed of a mixture of unpainted aluminium and white painted steel cars on the District line.

After World War II it was decided to replace the London Underground trains that remained with hand-operated sliding doors. R Stock was ordered to replace such trains on the District line and the LPTB considered 200 cars were needed, but due to the shortages of labour and materials following the war only 143 new cars were authorised. Some Q stock trailers that had been built in 1938 were converted into R Stock driving motor (DM) cars. The new cars were designated R47 and built by Birmingham RC&W and Gloucester RC&W and the 82 Q Stock trailers converted by Gloucester RC&W from Q38 trailer were designated R38/1. The first car arrived in 1949 and entered service in 1950.

A second batch was ordered to allow the F Stock to be transferred to Metropolitan line and so allow the Circle Stock to be withdrawn. The 90 new R49 cars were constructed from aluminium and built by Metro Cammell, reducing the weight of a train by 5.4 long tons (5.5 t; 6.0 short tons). An eight car train from this batch was unpainted as an experiment. A third batch of 20 R59 cars, 13 new, was built to allow the transfer of Q stock trailers to increase the length of Circle line trains to six cars.

== Description ==
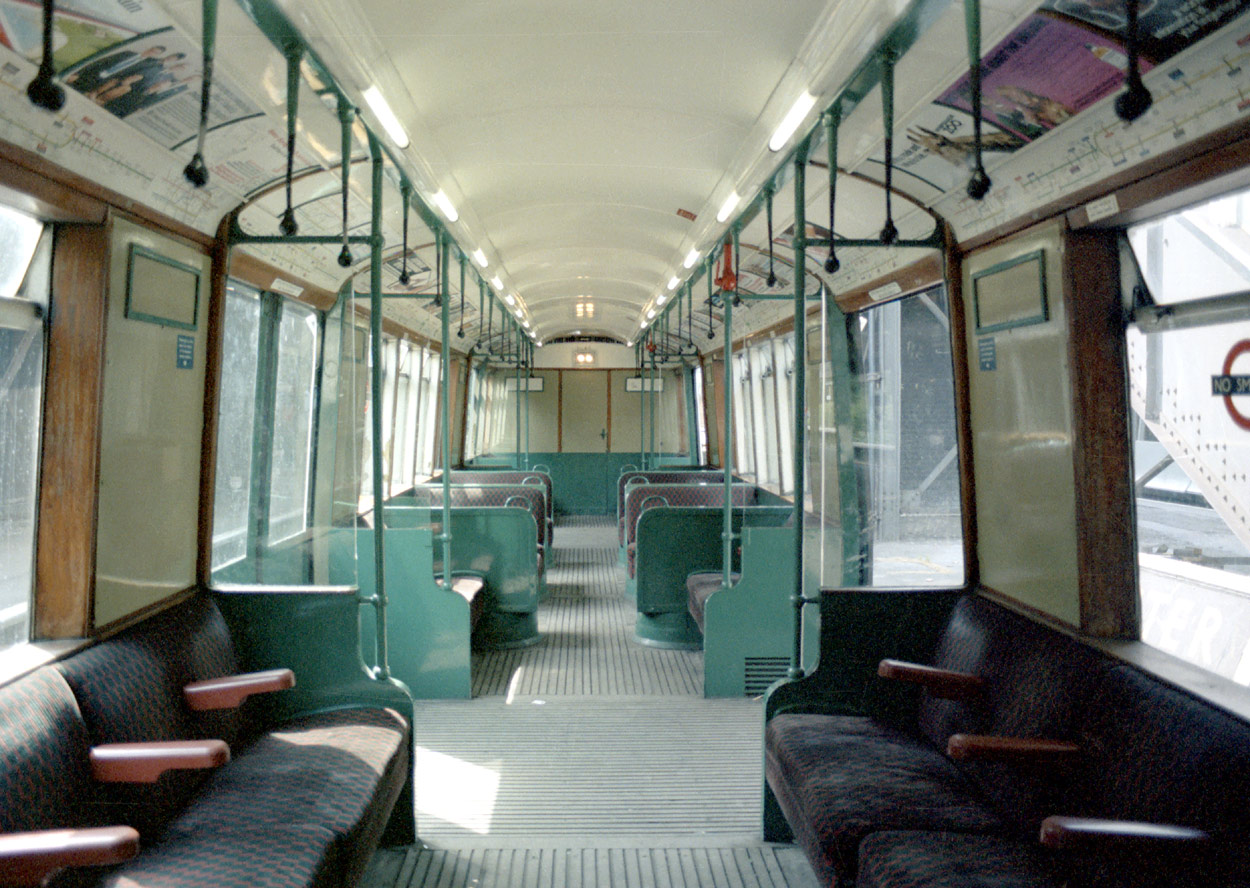
Inside an R38 stock driving motor (DM). These had four small windows in the central saloon between the double doors, and two sets of transverse seats in the centre bay.

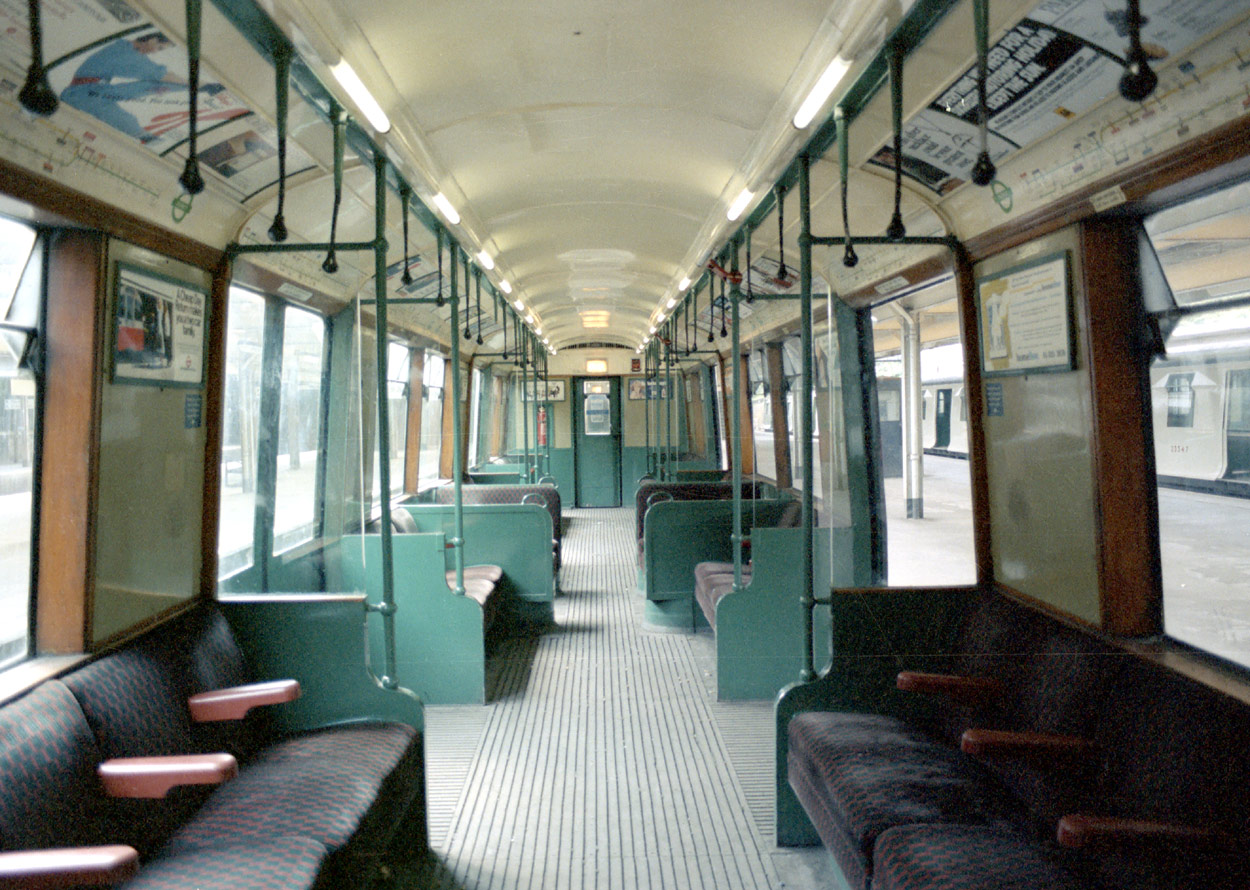
Inside an R stock non driving motor (NDM). These had two windows in the central saloon between the double doors, and one set of transverse seats in the centre bay.

Although visually similar to the R Stock trains there were some differences from the O, P and Q Stock trains. These included external 'door open' indicator lights, roller destination blinds, fluorescent lighting and a modified way of displaying the internal advertisements and District line route maps. One of the most noticeable differences between the R38 Stock and the rest of the R Stock fleet was that the R38 cars featured four small windows in the central saloon between the double doors, whereas the R47, R49, and R59 cars featured just two larger windows in the same location. All R Stock cars seated 40 passengers, however whilst the R38 cars featured two sets of transverse seats in the centre bay, the rest of the fleet featured just one set of transverse seats, and more longitudinal seating.

== History ==
Carriage interior in use in c1970.

Cars were formed into semi-permanent units and when first placed in service, these were either four-car units with the cab at the west end (DM-NDM-NDM-NDM) or two-car units with the cab at the east end (NDM-DM). For off-peak service, one unit of each type was coupled together to form a six-car train, whilst at peak times, several such trains would be lengthened to eight cars by the addition of a second two-car unit. A maximum of 36 eight-car trains could be formed, with the remaining 15 running as six-car. Initially the R Stock trains were painted red, to match the O, P and Q Stock trains, but one eight-car train of R49 stock was left unpainted, as an experiment. The R59 stock was also unpainted; the R38/3 stock that was converted to run with it was painted silver-grey to match. Since the trains were regularly reformed between 6 and 8 car lengths it became usual to see trains of mixed red and silver formation, so in 1963–68 all the red R Stock trains were repainted white to match the unpainted aluminium cars.

The coupling between two units was of the Wedglock type, and one of these was fitted at the eastern end of all units and at the western ends of the two-car units. Coupling of two units was automatically achieved by driving the two together. To uncouple two units, an uncoupling control was operated in one of the cars adjacent to the coupler. Two-car units had this in the driving cab, but four-car units, having no cab at the eastern end, were provided with a key-operated control on the outside of the car end. The four-car units had a Ward coupler at the western end, because this end would not normally need to couple. In both types of unit, there was a bar coupling between cars, which could only be uncoupled in a workshop.

In 1962/63 one train of R stock featured in early trials of automatically driven trains, prior to the larger scale trials on the Central Line which preceded the use on the Victoria line. These trials involved the one eastbound District Line train travelling in automatic mode between Stamford Brook and Ravenscourt Park stations. In 1971 it was decided to abandon the practice running trains with six cars off-peak and eight cars during the peak; instead all District line trains would be seven cars in length. 36 of the four-car units were reduced to three cars; these units would in future always be coupled to two two-car units to form a seven car train. The remaining 15 four-car units were lengthened to five cars by adding one of the released cars; these units would work with a single two-car unit. This left 21 cars (all of R47 type) spare that were sent for scrap.

== Withdrawal and preservation ==
Twenty-one cars were withdrawn between October 1971 and February 1972 as a result of the reformation into 7-car trains and others were withdrawn between 1971 and 1982 due to fire damage. General withdrawal began in March 1981 and was completed in March 1983. The Athens-Piraeus Electric Railways showed interest in purchasing 60 cars of R stock, for use in five-car trains, since the dimensions of that system were similar to the District Line, but the deal fell through.

They were replaced by the new D78 Stock, except on the Edgware Road-Wimbledon route, where shorter platforms necessitated the use of C Stock.

Three vehicles have been preserved.

- R38 DM no. 22624 – Mangapps Railway Museum
- R49 DM no. 21147 – Beaconsfield - Private Owner
- R49 DM no. 22679 – London Transport Museum, Acton

== See also ==
- G series (Toronto subway) - influenced by R-stock and Q38 stock and built by same builder

== Notes and references ==
=== References ===
- Bruce, J Graeme (1983). Steam to Silver: A History of London Transport Surface Rolling Stock. Capital Transport. ISBN 978-0-904711-45-5.
- Connor, Piers (1983). The 'R' Stock Story. Hemel Hempstead: London Underground Railway Society. ISBN 0-9508793-0-4.
- Horne, Mike (2006). The District Line. Capital Transport. ISBN 1-85414-292-5.
