= London Underground GN&C Stock =

Class of train rolling stock

The GN & C Stock was operated on the Great Northern and City Railway, an underground railway line in London, England. It was opened between Moorgate and Finsbury Park on 14 February 1904. The original GN&C Stock operated on the line between 1904 and 1939.

== Construction ==
The line was operated by electric multiple unit trains from the outset. The initial rolling stock were 77 carriages intended to form 11 seven carriage trains. In practice six carriage trains were operated. They used a multiple unit control system known as the Sprague-Thomson-Houston system. Power was supplied for the line from a power station in Poole Street, which was later converted into the film studios of Gainsborough Pictures.

The electrical equipment for the line – including the rolling stock – was ordered from the British Thomson Houston company, which subcontracted the building of the trains to Brush of Loughborough and the Electric Railway Tramway & Carriage works of Preston. The majority of the carriages were of teak bodywork, although eighteen carriages built by Brush were wooden framed with steel panelling. The carriages were built to a main line loading gauge (unlike the smaller profile of trains on the Northern line and other tube lines).

A single sliding door was provided in the middle of each carriage. Gates were provided at the carriage ends.

The line (and the trains) were acquired by the Metropolitan Railway in 1913, which became part of the London Passenger Transport Board in 1933.

== Replacement and successors ==
The trains were replaced by Northern line Standard Stock tube trains on 15 May 1939 and all the original GN&C stock was scrapped. As part of the 1935–1940 New Works Plan, the London Passenger Transport Board aimed to integrate the Great Northern and City line into the Northern line, extending to Alexandra Palace and Bushey Heath. These plans were curtailed by World War II and the Northern City line (or "Highbury Branch") continued operating with 1938 Stock until 1975, when the line was transferred to British Rail. Between 1976 and 2019 the line was operated exclusively by British Rail Class 313 electric multiple units, which were replaced by Great Northern Class 717 trains from 2018.
