= London Underground M and N Stock =

British rolling stock

M and N Stock
- In service: 1935–1971
- Manufacturers: BRC&W (M Stock) and Metro-Cammell (N Stock)

Specifications
- Car length: 50 ft (15.24 m)
- Width: 8 ft 11 5/16 in (2.726 m)
- Height: 12 ft 3 1/2 in (3.747 m)
- Weight: DM 34.03 long tons (34.58 t; 38.11 short tons); T 23.82 long tons (24.20 t; 26.68 short tons)
- Seating: 42

The London Underground M Stock and N Stock were similar designs of rolling stock built in 1935. As the new cars were urgently required they were based on existing L Stock. Several years after construction both types were absorbed into the Q Stock. The last of these trains were withdrawn in 1971.

== London Underground M Stock ==
London Underground M Stock was a clerestory-roofed rail stock built for the Hammersmith & City line in 1935 and subsequently absorbed into the London Underground Q Stock, being redesignated Q35 Stock. Twenty-eight cars were built in 1935 by Birmingham Railway Carriage and Wagon Company: fourteen were driving motor cars and the rest were trailers. All the driving motor cars were converted to trailers between 1947 and 1955.

The M Stock was the first surface stock to be delivered with air-operated doors.

Upon conversion to Q Stock, all the cars were transferred to the District line (with the Hammersmith and City Line services being operated from 1938 onwards by new trains of O Stock).

== London Underground N Stock ==
London Underground N Stock was a type of clerestory-roofed stock built in 1935 and subsequently absorbed into the London Underground Q Stock, being redesignated Q35 Stock. Twenty-six cars, all trailers, were built in 1935 by Metropolitan Cammell.
