= London Underground S Stock (ex-Metropolitan Railway) =

British rolling stock

S Stock (ex-Metropolitan Railway)
- Stock type: Subsurface
- In service: 1919-1950

S stock is the designation given to one train of eight cars by London Underground in the 1930s. It was composed of converted trailers and experimental driving motor cars inherited from the Metropolitan Railway in 1933.

== Trailer cars ==
In 1919, the Metropolitan Railway converted six 1904 saloon stock cars into the "Hustler train". These were the only cars of this type: two were driving motors, two were control trailers, which the Metropolitan called driving trailers, and the remaining two were trailers. In 1936, the two driving motors were converted into trailers, and all six cars were used with two 1925-built prototype driving motors.

== Driving motor cars ==
In 1925, two driving motor cars were built as prototypes for what would later become the T stock. In the London Passenger Transport Board numbering scheme, they became 2598 and 2599. After the trailer cars were withdrawn from service in the 1940s, the two driving motor cars remained in service on the East London Line, being used with a 1923-built control trailer. These three cars were withdrawn in 1950.
