= London Underground L Stock =

British rolling stock

L Stock
- In service: 1931–1971
- Manufacturer: UCC

Specifications
- Car length: 49 ft 8 in (15.14 m)
- Width: 8 ft 11 5/16 in (2,726 mm)
- Height: 12 ft 3 1/2 in (3,746 mm)
- Weight: 34.08 long tons (34.63 t; 38.17 short tons)
- Seating: 42

London Underground L Stock was a clerestory-roofed rail stock built for the District line in 1932 and subsequently absorbed into the London Underground Q Stock, being redesignated Q31 Stock.

== History ==
The L Stock trains were built to provide additional rolling stock for the eastward extension of the District Line from Barking to Upminster. Two new electrified tracks were added parallel to the existing steam-operated LMS lines, including several new stations such as Upminster Bridge.

Forty-five cars were built by the Union Construction Company, eight were driving motor cars and the rest were trailers. An innovation for surface stock was the provision of a sliding door at the guard's position. The eight motor cars, numbered 700-714 (even numbers only), were initially owned by the London Midland and Scottish Railway.

The L Stock was based on the 1927 K Stock.

== Fate ==
The conversion from L Stock to Q31 Stock took place in the late 1930s, with the major modifications being the conversion of the hand-operated sliding doors to air operation and the provision of electro-pneumatic brakes. The last Q Stock trains were withdrawn in 1971.
