= London Underground A60 and A62 Stock =

British electric rolling stock (built 1960)

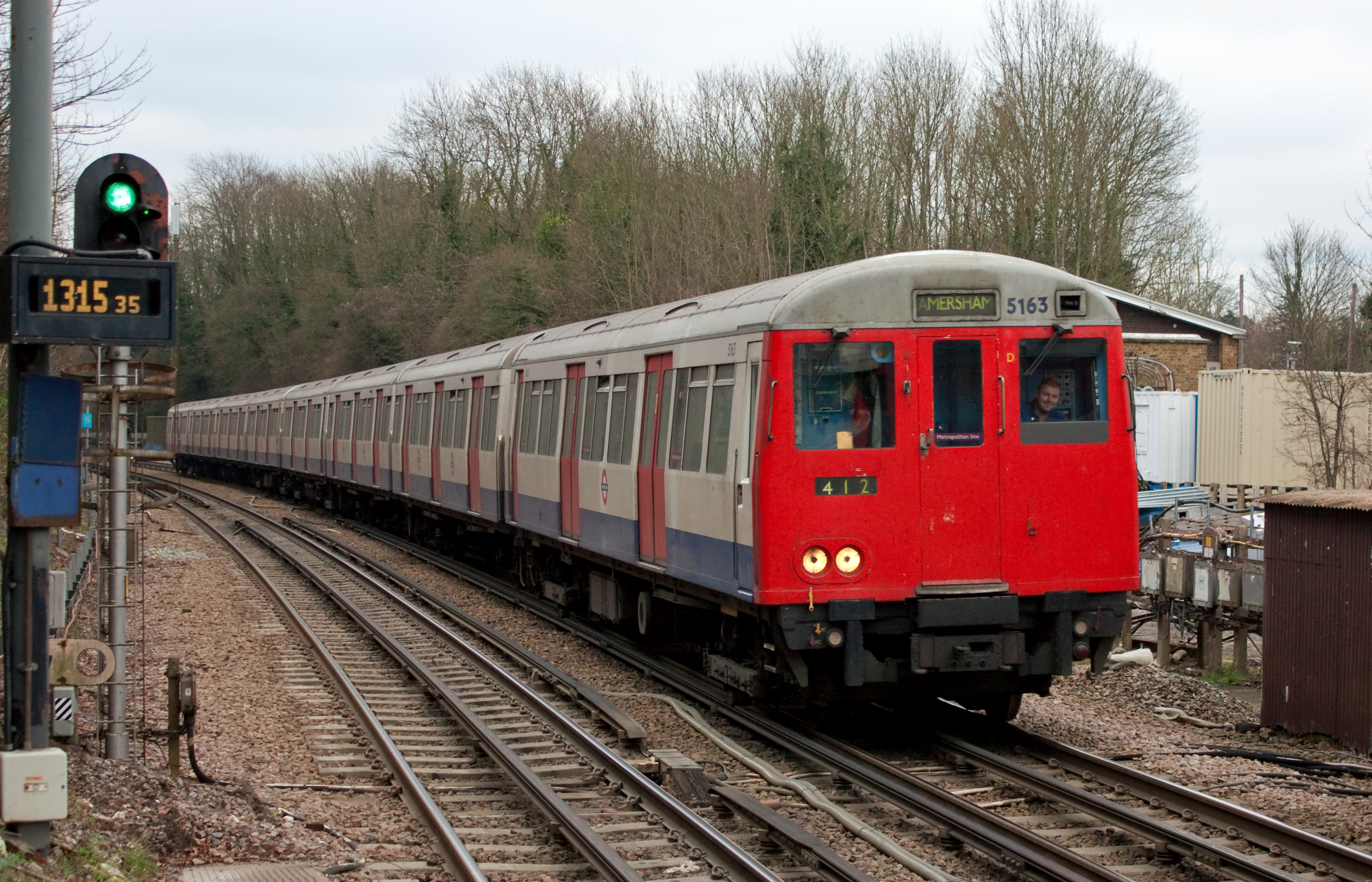
- Metropolitan line A Stock train at Chorleywood in January 2012

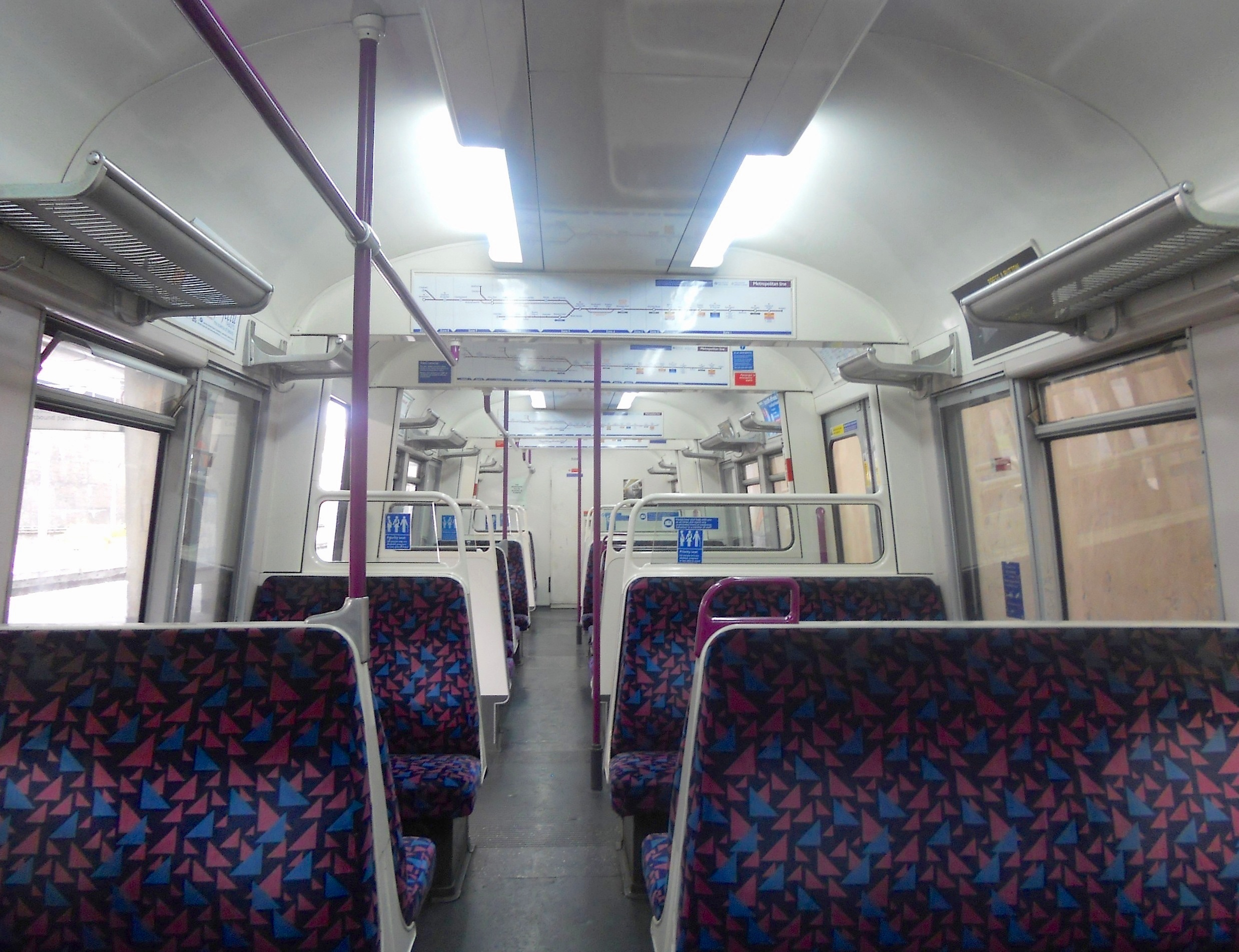
- The interior of a refurbished A Stock car
- In service: 12 June 1961 – 26 September 2012
- Manufacturer: Cravens
- Built at: Sheffield, England
- Replaced: T Stock; F Stock; P Stock; 1938 Stock
- Constructed: 1960–1962
- Entered service: 1961–1963
- Refurbished: Adtranz (at Derby Litchurch Lane Works) 1994–1998
- Scrapped: 1987/1994/2011–2012/2018
- Number built: 58 trains
- Number preserved: 2 cars
- Number scrapped: 57 trains + 6 cars
- Successor: S8 Stock; Class 378
- Formation: DM-T-T-DM (per unit)
- Fleet numbers: DM: 5000-5233; T: 6000-6233
- Capacity: DM: 54 seats + 4 tip-up seats T: 58 seats
- Operator: London Underground
- Depot: Neasden
- Lines served: Metropolitan; East London

Specifications
- Car body construction: Aluminium
- Train length: 212 ft (64.62 m) (4 cars)
- Car length: 53 ft .5 in (16.2 m)
- Width: 9 ft 8 in (2.9 m)
- Height: 12 ft 1 in (3.7 m)
- Entry: Level
- Doors: DM: two double and one single T: three double
- Wheel diameter: 3 ft (914 mm)
- Maximum speed: 70 mph (110 km/h)
- Weight: DM: 32.1 t (31.6 long tons; 35.4 short tons); T: 21.8 t (21.5 long tons; 24.0 short tons)
- Traction system: Pneumatic camshaft resistance control (Associated Electrical Industries)
- Traction motors: Type LT114 300V ^{DC} series-wound motor (GEC @ Witton)
- Transmission: 17:74 ratio
- Auxiliaries: Motor-Alternator-Rectifier MG3005 (Associated Electrical Industries)
- Electric system: 630 V DC fourth rail
- Current collection: Contact shoe
- UIC classification: Bo′Bo′+2′2′+2′2′+Bo′Bo′
- Track gauge: 1,435 mm (4 ft 8 1/2 in) standard gauge

The London Underground A60 and A62 Stock, commonly referred to as A Stock, was a type of sub-surface rolling stock which operated on the Metropolitan line of the London Underground from 12 June 1961 to 26 September 2012, and on the East London line from 1977 until 22 December 2007, when it closed to be converted into London Overground (except in 1986, when one-man operation conversion of the fleet took place).

The stock was built in two batches (A60 and A62) by Cravens of Sheffield in the early 1960s, and replaced all other trains on the line.

At the time of its withdrawal in September 2012, the stock was the oldest on the Underground, having been in service for over 50 years. It was the only stock to have luggage racks, umbrella hooks and separate power and braking controls, and the last stock not to feature any automated announcements.

== Development and introduction ==
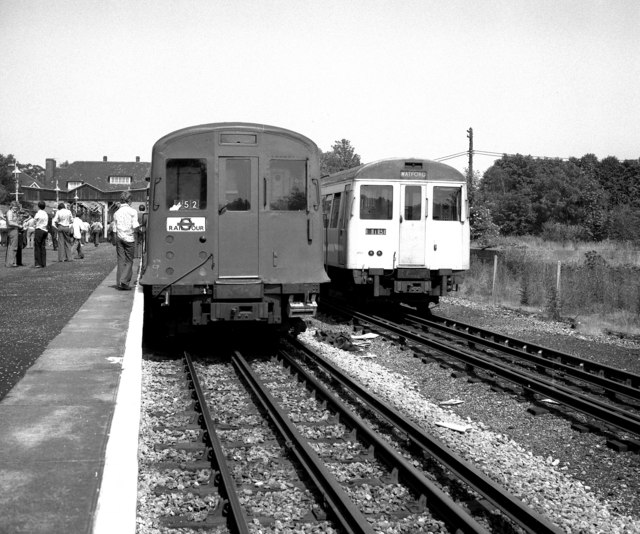
An A Stock train stabled at Watford next to one of its predecessors, the P Stock

The design was formulated by W. S. Graff-Baker of the London Passenger Transport Board, as part of the electrification of the Metropolitan line from Rickmansworth to Amersham and Chesham under the 1935–1940 New Works Programme.

Initial plans for a new Metropolitan line fleet proposed 23 eight-car trains to be reformed from the later builds of T Stock in February 1939 by equipping them with air-worked doors, but the start of the Second World War brought the whole scheme to a halt.

Upon revisiting the plans in 1944, construction began on a test car shell, numbered 17000, at Acton Works with features later incorporated into the production fleet, notably the wide body profile and three air-operated sliding double-doorways which were worked by an additional guard in the adjacent coupled coach. As a compromise between efficient practices of slam-door stock and increased room and safety of sliding-door trains, the interior layout featured an unusual central seating aisle with corridors on both sides and a central partition. Overall, the prototype car was mounted on a T Stock trailer underframe and District line type K2 bogies and was painted in London Transport red livery.

Trailer car 17000 was put into service in January 1946, coupled within a T Stock unit. Public reaction was negative, owing to the seats not being abutted to any windows with the side corridors present alongside little protection from the weather as the doors opened adjacent to the seats. Following on from this feedback, a second prototype car of a similar profile (numbered 20000) was constructed and entered service in June 1947, this time with two double-doorways, a central corridor and pairs of side seats. 17000 had its interior rebuilt to match 20000 in November 1949 and was renumbered 17001. The two trailer cars remained permanently coupled until their withdrawal from service in 1953.

A mock-up driving motor car was also constructed at Acton Works in 1950 based on the prototype T Stock cars. It featured circular windows and a rounder body profile, matching that of the 1938 Stock.

With electrification recommencing in 1959, London Transport placed an order with Cravens of Sheffield for 31 four-car trains to replace both T Stock on services to Watford and Rickmansworth, and locomotive-hauled services to destinations north of Rickmansworth. These trains were designated as A Stock to mark the electrification of the Metropolitan line to Amersham. As such, the earlier batch were referred as the A60 Stock. The first units, 5004 and 5008, entered service to Watford in June 1961. London Transport later ordered an additional 27 A62 Stock trains; these were introduced between 1961 and 1963 to replace F and P Stocks on the Uxbridge branch. By December 1963, the roll-out was complete.

Four-car units were also used on the East London line (initially a branch of the Metropolitan line) from 1977 until 2007, when the line closed to become part of the London Overground network, trains traversing empty between New Cross and Neasden Depot.

== Operation and refurbishment ==
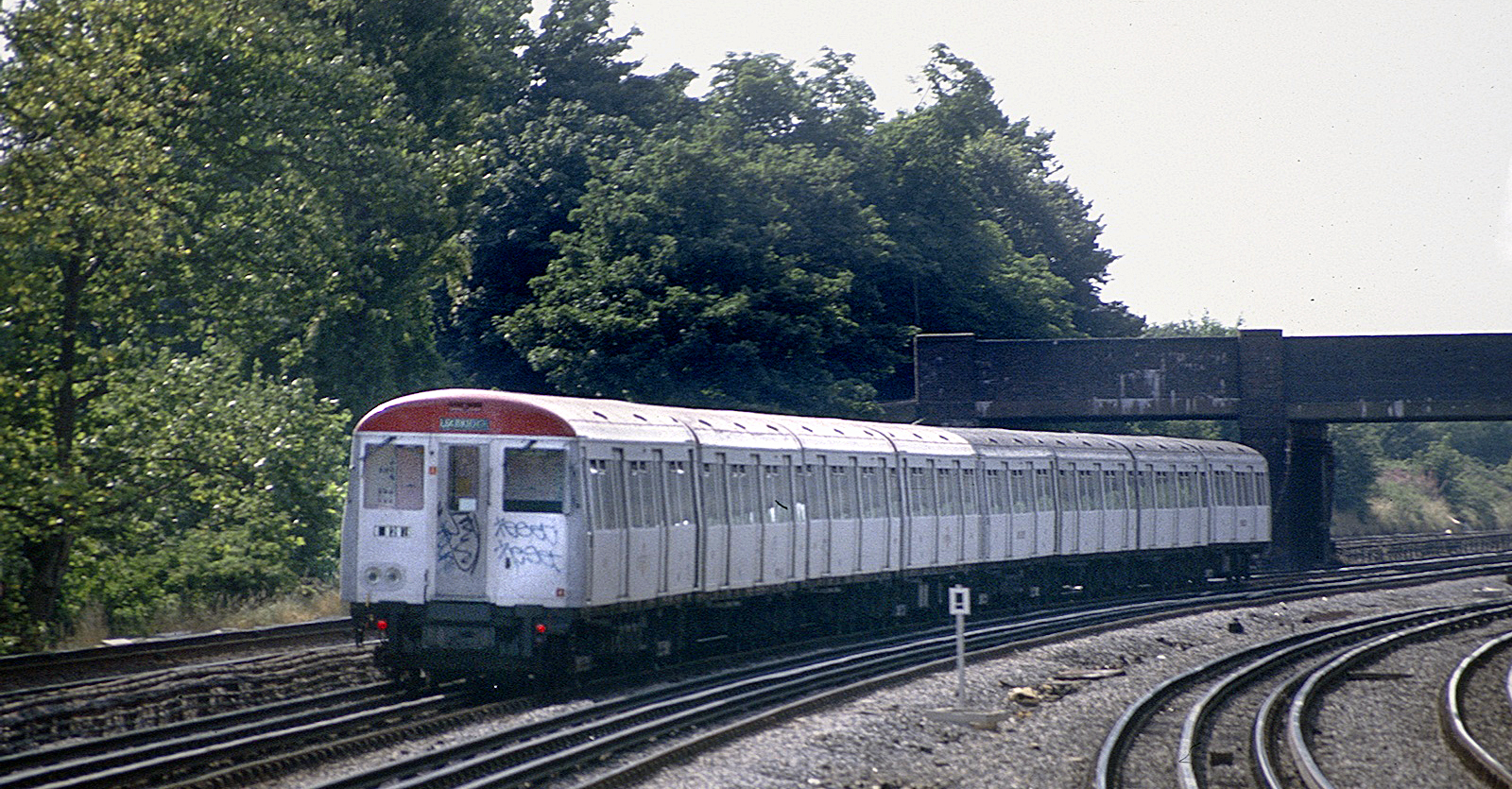
A red-roofed A Stock in original unpainted livery in 1988

To avoid hauling under-utilised carriages, eight-car trains were divided into their component four-car units at the end of the peak hours, with one unit often stabled. At the start of the peak hours, single units would be coupled to create a longer train. Although this practice was discontinued across the Underground network upon the A Stock's introduction, the unique nature of the Metropolitan line prolonged the operation. From June 1962, decouplings were scheduled at Uxbridge, Watford or Rickmansworth in the platforms, and at Amersham in the sidings.

The practice was discontinued after the 1980 summer season; with exception for the Chalfont & Latimer–Chesham shuttle and East London line, which always required four-car units anyway; since it had become an operational nuisance, with uncoupling usually being cancelled during the winter as it was hazardous in leaf-fall and icy conditions. This also greatly simplified subsequent rolling stock modifications to equip controls for one person operation (OPO) since the inner car cabs would not need to be converted. Conversion to OPO took place on the Metropolitan line from 29 September 1986, following modifications to driving cars with new door controls, safety equipment and larger headlights.

Beginning in 1987, overhauls at Neasden depot saw seven A Stock units having their roofs painted in maroon while a further three were painted in red. Some units had names painted on the cab fronts but this was short-lived due to management objections. In 1989 two A Stock units were fitted with different interiors and repainted into corporate liveries to gauge public opinion prior to refurbishment of the entire fleet.

Commencing between 1994 and 1997, the A Stock trains were refurbished by Adtranz at Derby Litchurch Lane Works, which saw new interiors fitted, car end windows installed, new moquette sewn, the corporate livery being applied and suspension improved. At the time of refurbishment, the Metropolitan line had a low priority for receiving new trains. When built it had a top speed of 70 mph (110 km/h) (world's fastest fourth-rail train), but following refurbishment it was restricted to 50 mph (80 km/h) to improve reliability.

== Design ==
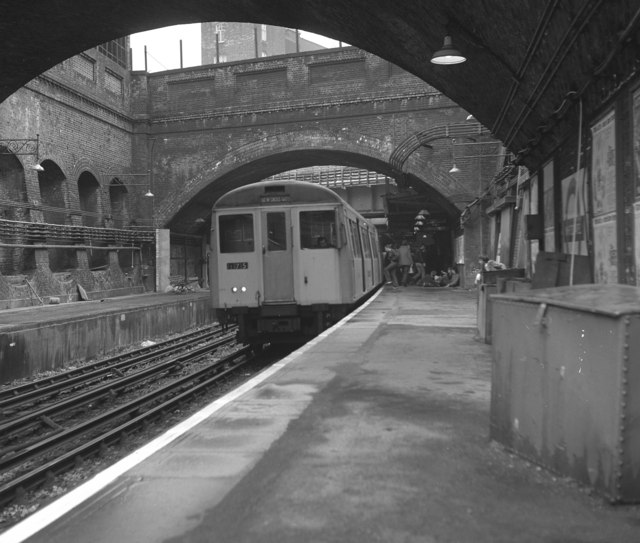
East London line A Stock at Whitechapel in 1979

The stock was a compromise between the needs of longer-distance "outer suburban" passengers on the outer reaches of the line and short-distance "urban" passengers over the heavily used Circle and Hammersmith & City lines.

A distinctive feature was the use of transverse seating only, which was uncommon on the Underground, designed for journeys which might last over an hour. Most of the seating was of the high-back 2+3 arrangement. Other unusual features also included luggage racks and umbrella hooks, despite their presence on most contemporary British mainline trains.

Four tip-up seats, previously used by guards prior to conversion to one-person operation, were provided at the rear of the driving motor. Despite each 8-car train seating 448 passengers, the A Stock retrospectively provided fewer seats than the locomotive-hauled and T Stock trains that they replaced, but more seats than the S Stock which replaced them.

A60 and A62 Stocks were nearly identical in appearance. The most significant differences were the border around the destination window on A62 motor cars and the make of compressor under the trailer cars: A60 stock used the Westinghouse DHC 5A, A62 cars the Reavell TBC 38Z.

=== Other areas of operation ===
In addition to the Metropolitan line, A Stock was permitted to traverse the following sections, subject to the following restrictions:

Section	Passengers permitted	Coupled units permitted	Notes
Acton Town to Northfields and Northfields Depot	Yes	No	Westbound local line only. No access to Siding 7 at Northfields Depot.
Aldgate to Mansion House	No	Yes	
Baker Street to Edgware Road	Yes	Yes	No access to side platforms at Edgware Road.
Edgware Road to Hammersmith	No	No	Specific authorization is required to run on this section.
Edgware Road to High Street Kensington	No	No	
Embankment to High Street Kensington and Rayners Lane (via Acton Town), including the Cromwell Curve	No	Yes	No access to the Acton Town, Barons Court, and South Harrow sidings. 15 miles per hour (24 km/h) speed limit at three bridges between Acton Town and South Harrow.
Embankment to Mansion House	No	No	
Jubilee Line tracks between Finchley Road and Stanmore	Yes	Yes	No access to the Wembley Park and West Hampstead sidings. Usage permitted only when ATO is not in use.

== Roster ==
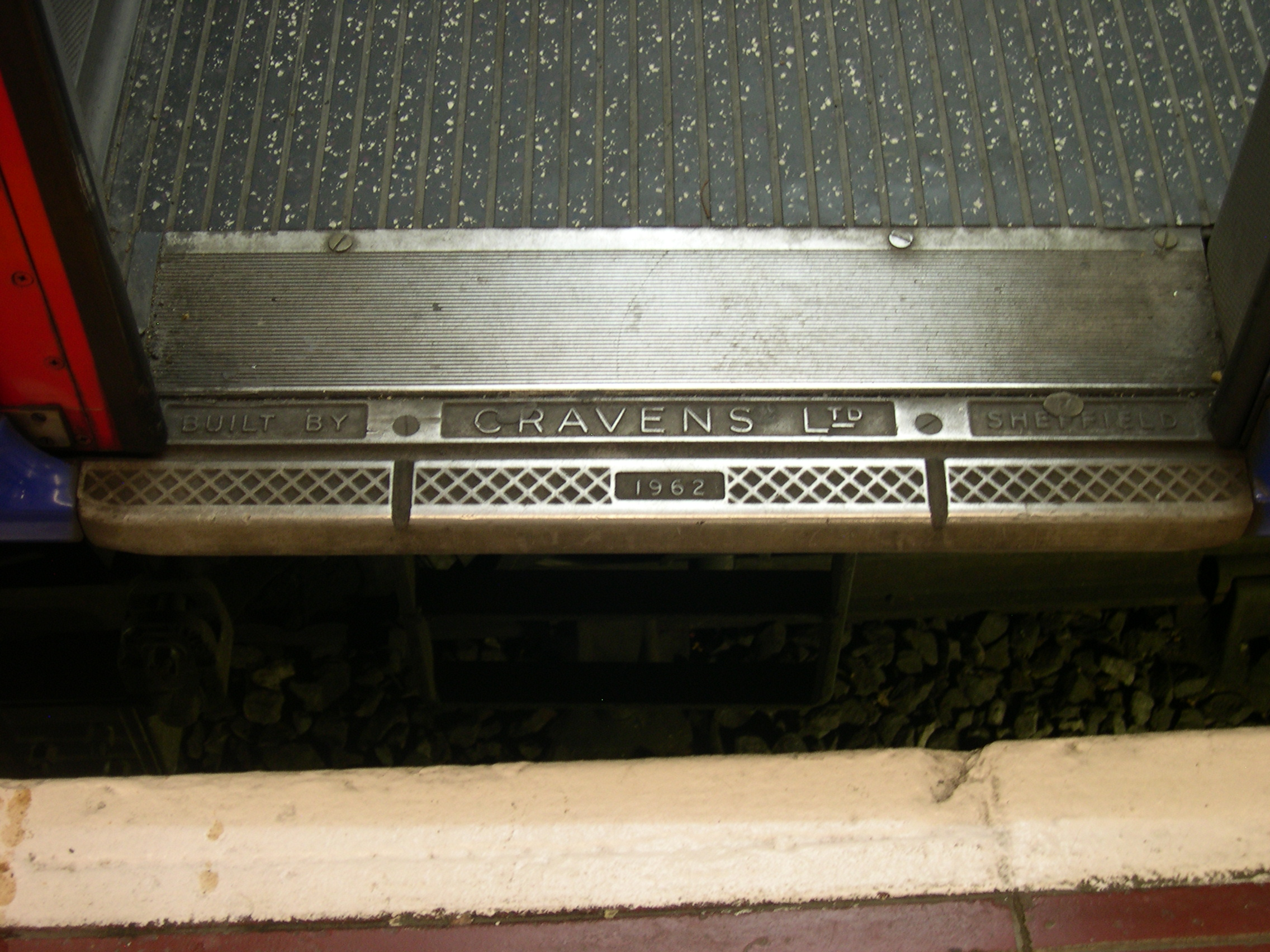
Name and manufacture year of an A62 Stock carriage in the doorway

Cars had a four-digit number. The first digit identified the type of car (driver or trailer), the last three digits the set (000 to 231).

Sub-type	Driving Motors (DM)	Trailers (T)
A60	5000 to 5123	6000 to 6123
A62	5124 to 5231	6124 to 6231
Citation: Hardy 2002, p. 36

In further detail:

Renumbered – unit exists, number withdrawn (x23x )
Scrapped before 2010
Preserved
Scrapped after the introduction of S stock
Rail Adhesion Train (now scrapped)

^ operational DM
† Renumbered
+ Replaced/formed with a renumbered car

A60
A DM	T		D DM	A DM	T		D DM	A DM	T		D DM	A DM	T		D DM	A DM	T		D DM	A DM	T		D DM
^5000	6000	6001	5001	^5022	6022	6023	5023	^5044	6044	6045	5045	^5066	6066	6067	5067^	^5088	6088	6089	5089^	^5110	6110	6111	5111^
^5002	6002	6003	5003	^5024	6024	6025	5025	^5046	6046	6047	5047	^5068	6068	6069	5069	^5090	6090	6091	5091^	^5112	6112	6113	5113^
^5004	6004	6005	5005^{[2]}	^5026	6026	6027	5027	^5048	6048	6049	5049	^5070	6070	6071	5071	^5092	6092	6093	5093^	^5114	6114	6115	5115^
^5006	6006	6007	5007^{[2]}	^5028†^{[c]}	6028†^{[c]}	6029	5029	^5050	6050	6051	5051	^5072	6072	6073	5073	^5094	6094	6095	5095^	^5116+^{[d]}	6116	6117†+^{[e]}	5117^†+^{[e]}
5008†+^{[a]}	6008†^{[a]}	6009†^{[b]}	5009†^{[b]}	^5030	6030	6031	5031	^5052	6052	6053	5053	^5074	6074	6075	5075	^5096	6096	6097	5097^	^5118	6118	6119	5119^
^5010	6010	6011	5011	^5032	6032	6033	5033	^5054	6054	6055	5055	^5076	6076	6077	5077	^5098	6098	6099	5099^	^5120	6120	6121	5121^+^{[g]}
^5012	6012	6013	5013	^5034†+^{[a]}	6034	6035	5035	^5056	6056	6057	5057^	^5078	6078	6079	5079	^5100	6100	6101	5101^	^5122	6122	6123	5123^
^5014	6014	6015	5015	5036†^{[d]}	6036^{[s]}	6037†^{[e]}	5037†^{[e]}	^5058	6058	6059	5059^	^5080	6080	6081	5081	^5102	6102	6103	5103^	^5232+^{[c]}	6232+^{[c]}	6233+^{[e]}	5233^+^{[e]}
^5016	6016	6017	5017	^5038	6038	6039	5039	^5060	6060	6061	5061^	^5082	6082	6083	5083	^5104	6104	6105	5105^	^5234+^{[a]}	6234+^{[a]}	6235+^{[b]}	5235^+^{[b]}
^5018	6018	6019	5019	^5040	6040	6041	5041	^5062	6062	6063	5063^	^5084	6084	6085	5085	^5106	6106	6107	5107^				
^5020	6020	6021	5021	^5042	6042	6043	5043	^5064	6064	6065	5065^	^5086	6086	6087	5087	^5108	6108	6109	5109^				
A62
A DM	T		D DM	A DM	T		D DM	A DM	T		D DM	A DM	T		D DM	A DM	T		D DM	A DM	T		D DM
^5124	6124	6125	5125	^5142	6142	6143	5143^{[2]}	5160	6160	6161	5161^	5178	6178	6179	5179^^{[2]}	5196	6196	6197	5197^^{[1]}	5214	6214	6215	5215^
^5126	6126	6127	5127	5144	6144	6145	5145^	5162	6162	6163	5163^	5180	6180	6181	5181^	5198	6198	6199	5199^	5216	6216	6217	5217^
^5128	6128	6129	5129	5146	6146	6147	5147^	5164	6164	6165	5165^	5182	6182	6183	5183^	5200	6200	6201	5201^	5218+^{[f]}	6218	6219	5219^
^5130	6130	6131	5131	5148	6148	6149	5149^	5166	6166	6167	5167^	5184	6184	6185	5185^	5202	6202	6203	5203^	5220	6220	6221	5221^
^5132	6132	6133	5133	5150	6150	6151	5151^	5168	6168	6169	5169^	5186	6186	6187	5187^	5204	6204	6205	5205^	5222	6222	6223	5223^
^5134	6134	6135	5135	5152	6152	6153	5153^	5170	6170	6171	5171	5188	6188	6189	5189^	5206	6206	6207	5207^	5224	6224	6225	5225^
^5136	6136	6137	5137	5154	6154	6155	5155^	5172	6172	6173	5173^^{[1]}	5190	6190	6191	5191^	5208†^{[f]}	6208	6209	5209†^{[g]}	5226	6226	6227	5227^
^5138	6138	6139	5139	5156	6156	6157	5157^	5174	6174	6175	5175^	5192	6192	6193	5193^	5210	6210	6211	5211^	5228	6228	6229	5229^
5140	6140	6141	5141^	5158	6158	6159	5159^	5176	6176	6177	5177^	5194	6194	6195	5195^	5212	6212	6213	5213^	5230	6230	6231	5231^

Renumberings:
a. 5034 and 5008 swapped numbers in July 1985; new 5008 and 6008 became set 5234-6234 in September 1994, 5034 preserved at the London Transport Museum depot, Acton.
b. set 5009-6009 renumbered 5235-6235 in September 1994.
c. set 5028-6028 renumbered 5232-6232 in June 1985.
d. 5036 renumbered 5116 in April 1993 (original 5116 scrapped in 1987 – collision at Kilburn, December 1984)
e. set 5117-6117 renumbered 5233-6233 in August 1985; set 5037-6037 renumbered 5117-6117 in April 1993.
f. 5208 renumbered 5218 in August 1992 (original 5218 scrapped in 1994 – experimental suspension)
g. 5209 renumbered 5121 in March 1993 (original 5121 scrapped in 1994 – collision at Neasden depot, October 1986)
Converted works vehicles:
s. Sandite dispenser car.
Withdrawals:
1. "Underground News". Underground News (588). London Underground Railway Society: 737. December 2010.
2. "Underground News". Underground News (591). London Underground Railway Society. March 2011.

== Withdrawal ==
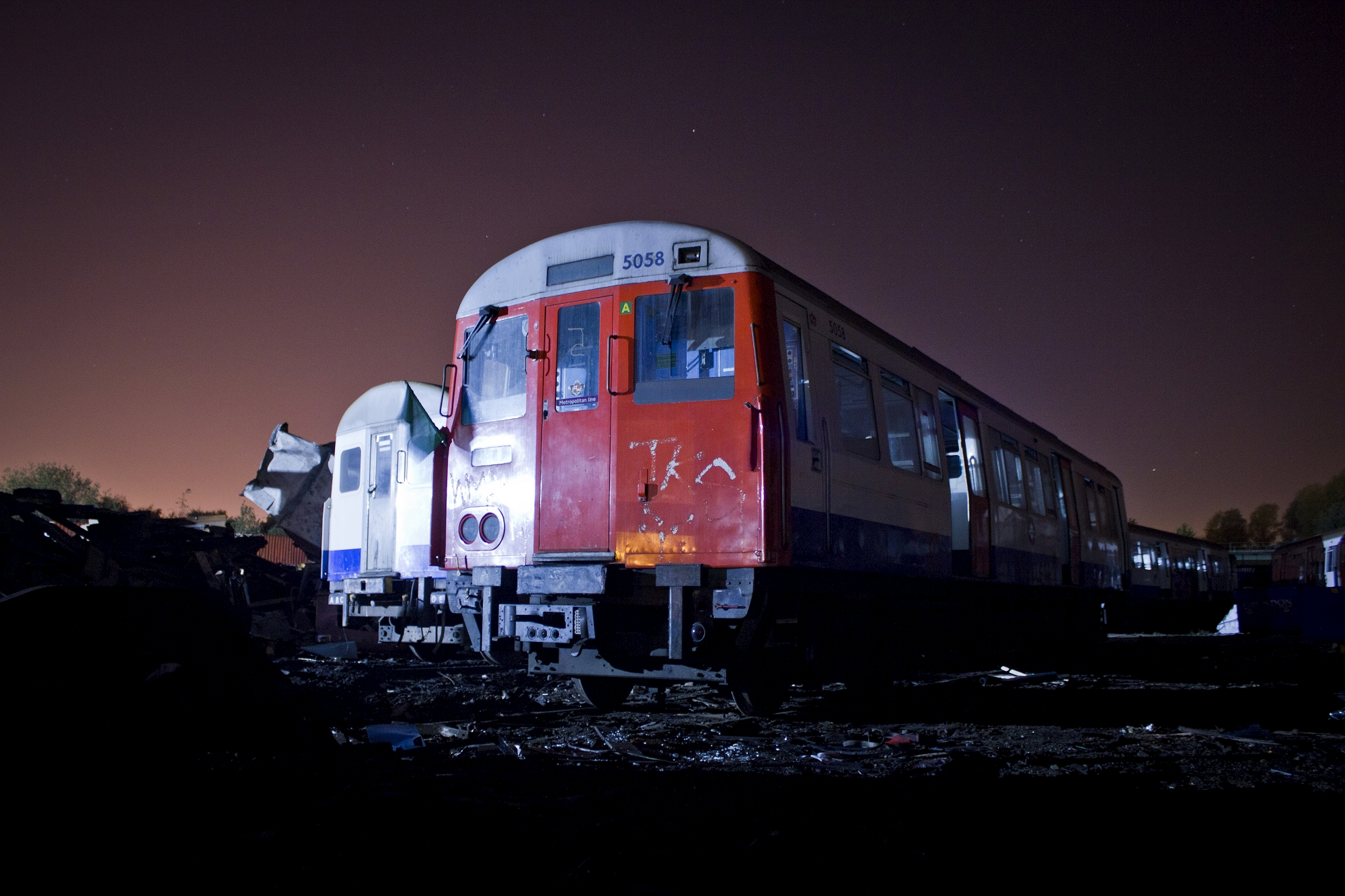
A60 stock train at C. F. Booth in Rotherham, waiting to be scrapped

The A Stock fleet reached 50 years of service on 12 June 2011. The age of the stock made spare parts more difficult to obtain and vehicles had to be cannibalised to keep the rest of the stock in operation.

S8 Stock trains replaced the stock, with the first unit introduced on 31 July 2010. This is similar to the S7 Stock for the District, Circle and Hammersmith & City lines; the main differences are the layout and number of seats and the provision of two sand hoppers for each rail due to the different conditions at the country end of the line. On 9 October 2010, the first eight cars of A Stock were sent for scrap, units 5197 and 5173. Main withdrawals began on 20 January 2011, with units 5006 and 5179 being sent to the CF Booths of Rotherham for scrapping.

In February 2012, the London Transport Museum began offering luggage racks from withdrawn A Stock for sale.

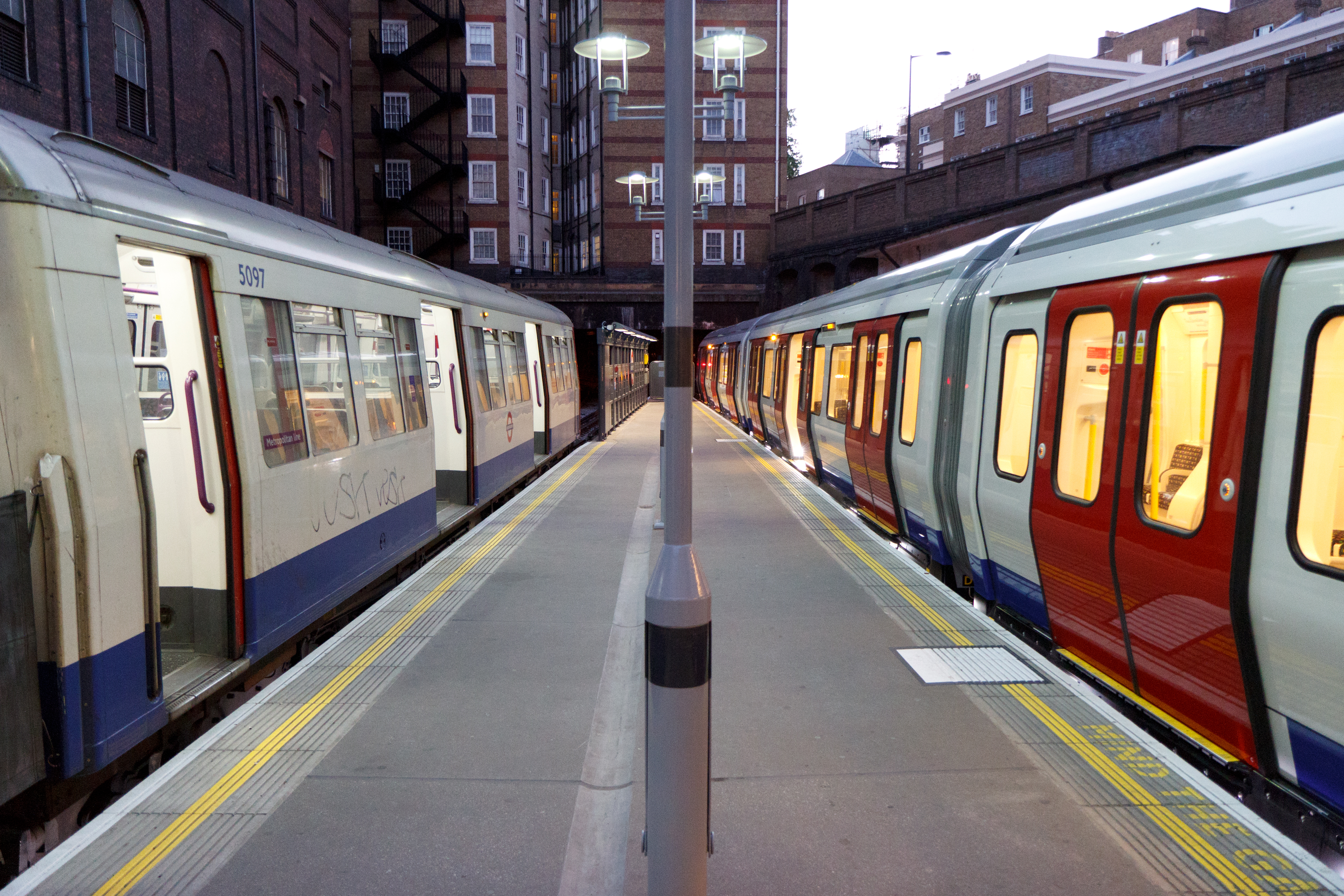
The old and the new. A Stock (left) and S Stock (right) at Baker Street in 2011

The last train ran in passenger service on 26 September 2012, formed of units 5034 and 5062. The same train was used a few days later on 29 September for a "farewell" railtour organised by the London Transport Museum, running along the entire Metropolitan line. At one point during the railtour, the train was unofficially recorded at 74 mph. One of the driving motor cars, 5034, which was part of the first (as 5008) and also the last A Stock train in service, was earmarked for preservation and was delivered to the London Transport Museum's Acton Depot.

One A Stock unit (5110-6110-6036-6111-5111) was retained for departmental use as a Rail Adhesion Train until March 2018, giving the fleet a total service span of 57 years. It had been last used in December 2017, when it had developed a fault and repairs were deemed unnecessary as it was planned to be withdrawn and replaced by a former District line D78 Stock unit at the end of the year.

The night of 24 May 2018 was the final time an A Stock unit ran under its own power on the London Underground network, the RAT set working an empty stock movement from Neasden Depot to Ealing Common Depot. The set was subsequently removed from the adjacent Acton Museum Depot by road for disposal on 17-18 July 2018.
