= London Underground F Stock =

British rolling stock

F Stock
- In service: 1920–1963
- Manufacturer: Met Cammell
- Successor: A60/A62 Stock

Specifications
- Car length: 49 ft 2 in (14.99 m)
- Width: 9 ft 6 15/16 in (2,919 mm)
- Height: 12 ft 4 1/2 in (3,772 mm)
- Weight: Driving Motor (DM): 39.64 long tons (40.28 t; 44.40 short tons); DM: 44.50 long tons (45.21 t; 49.84 short tons); Control Trailer (CT): 24.84 long tons (25.24 t; 27.82 short tons); Trailer (T): 24.50 long tons (24.89 t; 27.44 short tons); T: 34.50 long tons (35.05 t; 38.64 short tons)
- Seating: DM: 40; CT: 44; T: 48

The London Underground F Stock was built in 1920 and 1921 for the District Railway (later the London Underground District line) by the Metropolitan Carriage, Wagon and Finance Company. They were partly funded by the government as part of an initiative to help British industry recover from World War I. One hundred steel-bodied cars were built: 40 driving motors, 12 control trailers and 48 trailers with the first train entering service on 23 December 1920. The cars were built with manually operated sliding doors.

They had non-standard equipment that precluded multiple-unit operation with any other type of train, and had significantly more powerful motors which resulted in acceleration of 1.5 miles per hour per second (2.4 km/(h⋅s)) (which was considerably better than existing District Railway rolling stock). This led to some initial operating difficulties as the benefits of the new trains were not properly realised. The front ends of driving cabs had two distinctive oval windows separated by the centre door. This was a less-than-ideal design, because it limited the driver's forward view in what is now considered a cramped, ergonomically unfriendly cab.

As built, the initial design of the stock was unwelcoming with a cold steel appearance, seats covered in a Rexine-type material and roof-to-floor grab-poles for standing commuters. Frank Pick, the innovator of so much change on the Underground system, commissioned a well-known artist who improved the appearance of the upholstery, supplied armrests between individual seats, and replaced the grab-poles with hanging straps. The stock had both first- and third-class accommodation at this time.

Between 1938 and 1940, the control trailers were all rebuilt into driving motor cars, and the doors converted to air-operation with passenger push-button control.

In 1950 and 1951, after a final rehabilitation programme (which included the provision of door-locking), the F Stock was transferred to the Metropolitan line where it operated services between Uxbridge and London, even working the occasional service to Amersham and Watford. The first rehabilitated train ran on 27 February 1951. Because of their powerful motors, the F Stock was often used for semi-fast services in the morning peak (calling at all stations from Uxbridge to Rayners Lane, then stopping only at Harrow on the Hill before Finchley Road), with return services in the evening rush hour. When running fast, trains notably tended to roll and lurch along the track. Some four-car sets also worked the East London Line during the 1950s with maintenance being undertaken at Neasden depot.

The F Stock was replaced by A60 and A62 Stock in the early 1960s. A few units continued on the East London Line with the last set operating on 7 September 1963 (the last Uxbridge service had operated on 15 March 1963).

The F stock were initially nicknamed "Dreadnoughts" but they quickly became known as "Tanks", possibly because of their all-steel construction or because they had been built in workshops that had previously produced tanks during the war.

None survived into preservation.
