= London Underground G Stock =

British electric rolling stock

G Stock
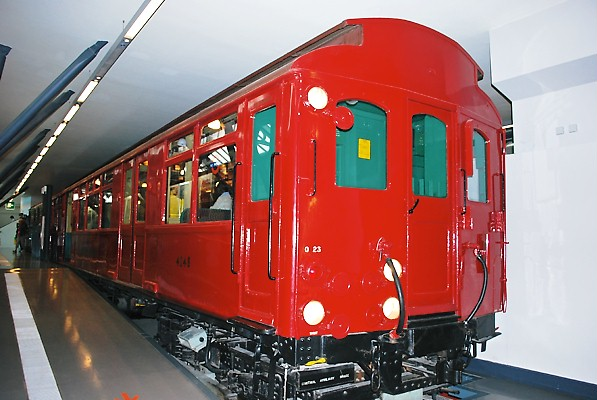
- G/Q23 stock at the London Transport Museum
- In service: 1923–1971
- Manufacturer: GRC&W

Specifications
- Car length: 49 ft 2 in (14.99 m)
- Width: 9 ft 0 1/16 in (2.745 m)
- Height: 12 ft 3 1/2 in (3.747 m)
- Weight: 33.6 long tons (34.1 t; 37.6 short tons)
- Seating: 44

The G Stock were 50 electric multiple unit train carriages built for the District Railway in 1923 by Gloucester RC&W. They operated on the District line of the London Underground until 1971 (with most cars being withdrawn in the early 1960s).

== Construction ==
The G Stock was built to allow the scrapping of some of wooden-built B Stock trailer cars which were in poor condition. Some steel-framed B Stock motor cars were converted to trailers, themselves being replaced by new G Stock motorcars. The G Stock consisted entirely of motor cars, all built with a clerestory roof similar in style to the B Stock with which they would work.

== Q Stock ==
In 1938, forty-eight of these cars were rebuilt when the District line was standardising its post-1923 stock and were reclassified as Q23 Stock. A major part of the Q Stock project was the replacement of the potentially dangerous manually operated sliding doors (which could be opened by passengers between stations) with air operated doors controlled by the guard.

In 1965, several cars were renumbered by adding 100 to the number to avoid conflicting numbers with the 1967 Stock being built for the Victoria line.

== South Acton shuttle ==
The two remaining cars were rebuilt into single cars for use on the South Acton shuttle, replacing a B Stock car. These two cars, numbered 4167 and 4176, were not rebuilt into Q Stock and were classified G23 Stock.

== Withdrawal ==
The majority of the cars were withdrawn in the early 1960s as CO/CP Stock trains transferred from the Metropolitan line started to become available. The last of the Q Stock was withdrawn in 1971.

Two driving motors have been preserved.

- DM no. 4184 - London Transport Museum, Acton
- DM no. 4248 - London Transport Museum, Covent Garden
