= London Underground K Stock =

British rolling stock

K Stock
- In service: 1927–1971
- Manufacturer: BRC&W

Specifications
- Car length: 50 ft (15.24 m)
- Width: 8 ft 11 5/16 in (2,726 mm)
- Height: 12 ft 3 1/2 in (3,746 mm)
- Weight: 33.90 long tons (34.44 t; 37.97 short tons)
- Seating: 42

London Underground K Stock is a clerestory-roofed rail stock built for the District line in 1927. It was subsequently absorbed into the London Underground Q Stock.

== History ==
A complete review of District line rolling stock was carried out in 1926, leading to the withdrawal of further B Stock cars and their replacement, plus additional rolling stock to increase frequencies. This led to the construction of the 101 motor cars of clerestory roofed K Stock.

== Fate ==
As built, the cars had hand-operated sliding doors. The doors were converted to air operation, and electro-pneumatic brakes added in 1938 as part of the Q Stock project. The modified cars were reclassified as Q27 stock. The last of the Q Stock was withdrawn in 1971.
