= London Underground O and P Stock =

British electric rolling stock

O Stock, P Stock, CO/CP Stock
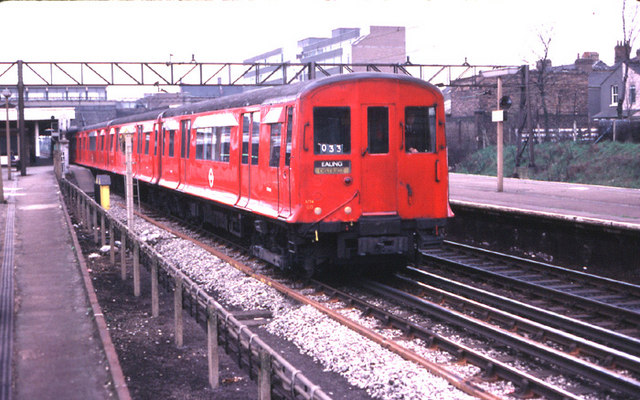
- A CO stock train on the District line leaving Barking in 1980
- Stock type: Subsurface
- In service: 1937–1981
- Manufacturer: GRC&W; BRC&W
- Successor: C Stock; D Stock

Specifications
- Car length: 51 ft (15.54 m)
- Width: 9 ft 8 3/8 in (2.956 m)
- Height: 11 ft 9 1/2 in (3.594 m)
- Weight: 35.75 long tons (36.32 t; 40.04 short tons)
- Seating: 42

The London Underground O and P Stock electric multiple units were used on the London Underground from 1937 to 1981. O Stock trains were built for the Hammersmith & City line, using metadyne control equipment with regenerative braking, but the trains were made up entirely of motor cars and this caused technical problems with the traction supply so trailer cars were added. P Stock cars were built to run together with the O Stock cars now surplus on Metropolitan line Uxbridge services. The trains had air-operated sliding doors under control of the guard; the O Stock with controls in the cab whereas the P Stock controls in the trailing end of the motor cars. The P Stock was introduced with first class accommodation, but this was withdrawn in 1940.

In the early 1950s, some Uxbridge O and P Stock trains were transferred to the Circle line. The increasingly unreliable metadynes were replaced and the converted trains became known as CO/CP stock. In the early 1960s, the remaining Uxbridge CO/CP Stock trains were transferred to the District line, so that during the 1960s generally Hammersmith & City and Circle line services were operated by CO stock and CP stock was used on the District line. Following the introduction of C69 Stock in the early 1970s, all CO and CP Stock trains were used on the District line until they were replaced by the C Stock and D Stock trains, with the last train running in service in 1981.

== Construction ==
In 1934, an experimental six-car train was built using a multiple-unit train control system developed by Metropolitan Vickers. The metadyne equipment controlled four traction motors on two cars and allowed for regenerative braking, although air braking was fitted for low speeds and if the traction supply was unreceptive to the regenerated current.

As part of the 1935–40 New Works Programme, the O stock, sets of two motor cars, was built for the Hammersmith & City line. The Gloucester Railway Carriage and Wagon Company (GRC&W) and the Birmingham Railway Carriage and Wagon Company (BRC&W) built 116 cars, allowing 19 six-car trains and a spare two-car set. The new trains entered service as a four-car train between High Street Kensington and Putney Bridge on 13 September 1937 and a full-length six car train later entering service on 10 December on the Hammersmith & City line. The guard's position was in the cab, continuing the practice of the Metropolitan Railway. Technical problems were found with the traction supply with trains made up entirely of motor cars and 58 trailer cars were ordered from Gloucester and the trains reformed into three car sets. The first reformed train went into service on 18 July 1938, and 19 O Stock sets were transferred to the Metropolitan line.

With O Stock cars available, 73 sets of P stock were ordered for the Metropolitan line. Six and eight car trains were needed, so six car trains were made up from two three car units formed of two driving motor cars and a trailer and eight cars by adding a two car unit. The guard's position on the P Stock was at the inner ends of the motor cars, as the cabs on eight car trains could still be in tunnel at stations with short platforms. The O Stock units, with the guard position in the cab, were split up and motor cars placed in the centre of the six car trains so that the door controls in these cabs were not needed. Six P1 motor cars were built without door controls and ran in the same position. Although a train could be made up from O and P Stock cars, and the units had automatic couplers on the outer ends of the motor cars, the metadynes were not interchangeable. The first P Stock train entered service on 17 July 1939. Six-car O Stock trains operated on the Hammersmith & City service, and the mixed O and P Stock trains provided the services to Uxbridge.

== Description ==
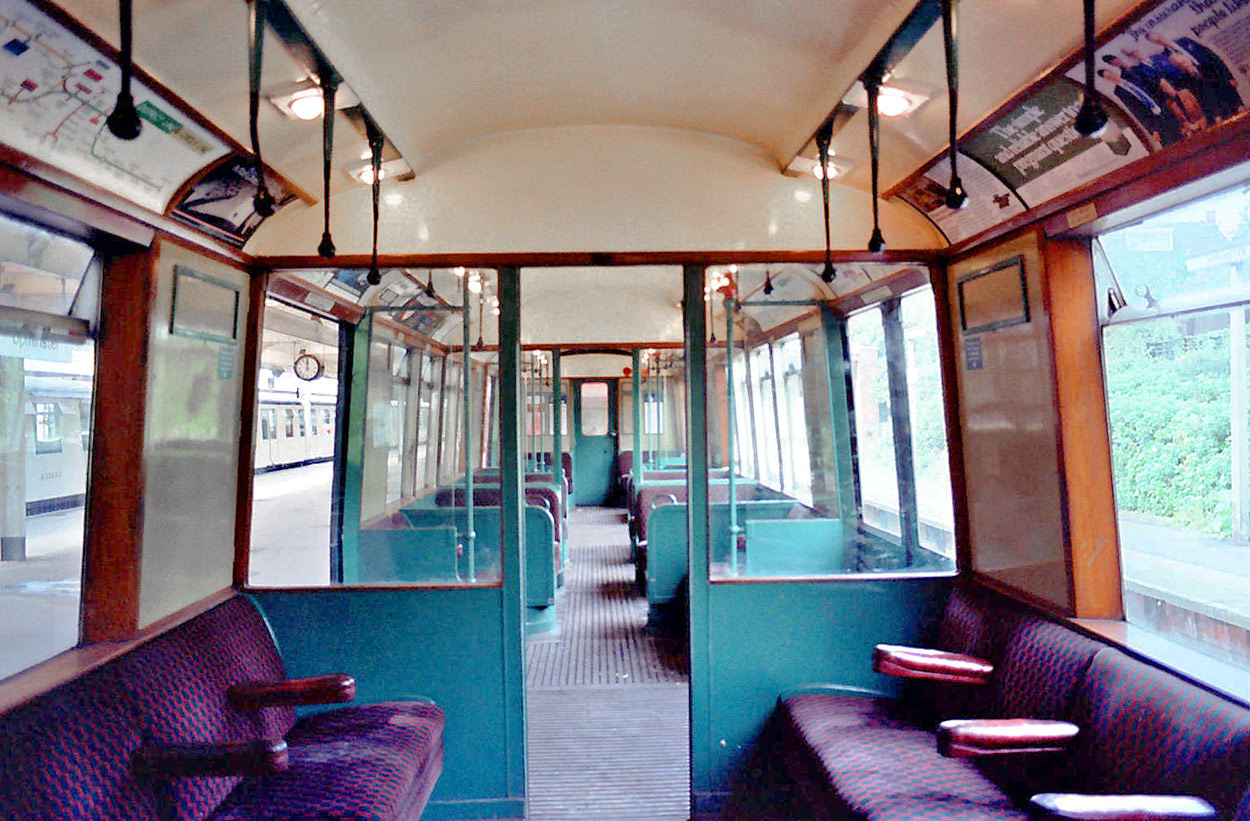
Inside a P Stock composite car at Upminster, built with first and third class sections for the Metropolitan line. First class was abolished in 1940 as a war-time economy.

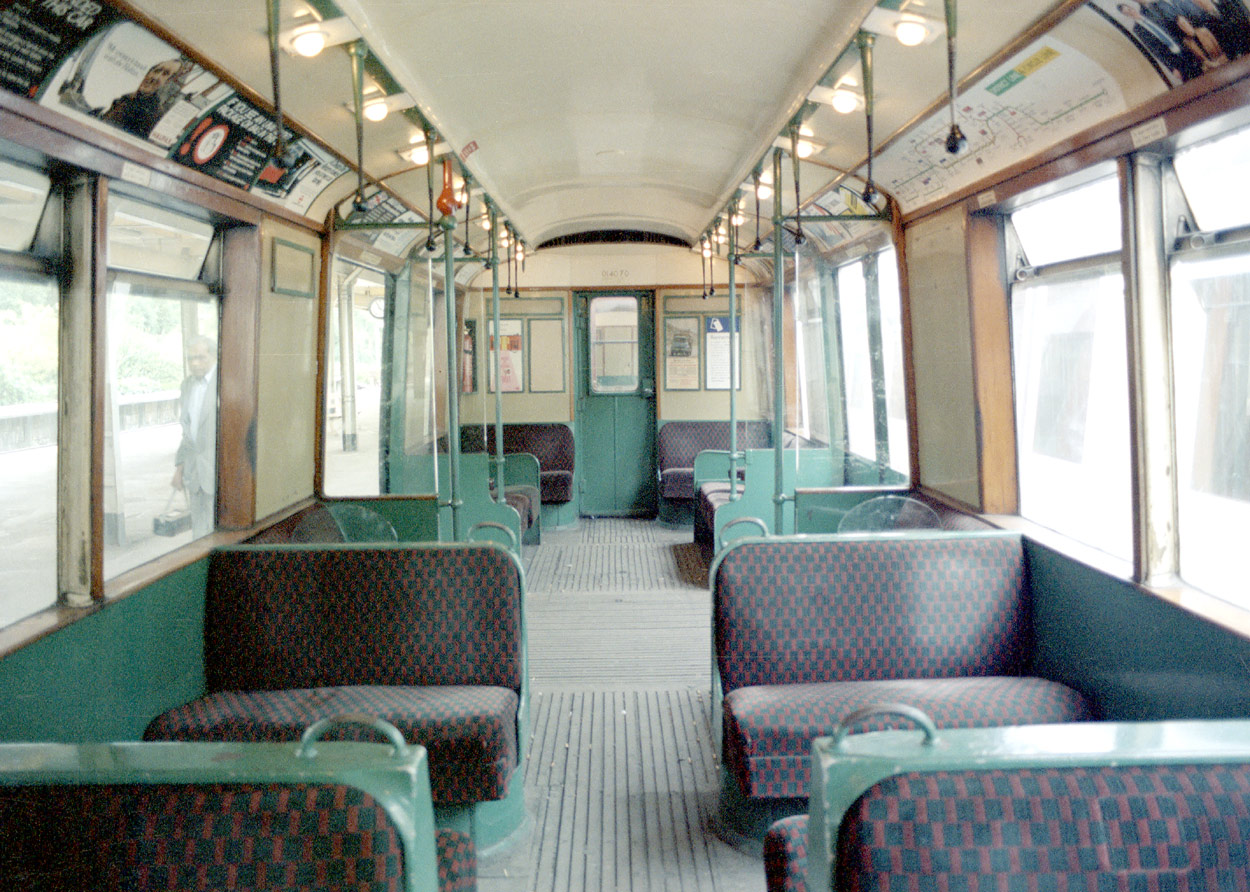
Inside a COP trailer.

The 51-foot (16 m) long O Stock cars were fitted with air operated doors under the control of the guard. A car had 40 seats and two tip up and access was by two double doors and a single door on each side. Externally, the cars had side panels that flared at the bottom with no running boards to prevent passengers jumping on a moving train and attempting to open a door. The trailers, with four extra seats, had a hinged door at one end, locked closed in normal use, so they could be converted into driving motor cars. Lighting was provided by incandescent bulbs in the ceiling.

== War time losses ==
During World War II several cars were lost. 14199 (P stock DM) was destroyed at Neasden on 27 September 1940, 13036, 14042, 14049 (all O stock DM), 13229, 14229 (all P Stock DM), 014080 (O stock trailer) at Moorgate station on 29 December 1941, and 14263 (P stock DM) at Baker Street on 10 May 1941. To make up for the number of 'D' end DMs (14xxx) cars destroyed, three 'D' end trailer cars were rebuilt into DMs. These were 014270-014272 which were renumbered 14270-14272 when converted. DM 14233 was damaged during bombing and one end of the car was destroyed. This was repaired using an end of Q38 Stock trailer 013167, which had also been badly damaged. The rebuilt car entered service renumbered 14233 in 1941; it became 54233 in 1963.

== Reconstruction into CO/CP Stock ==
In the early 1950s, F Stock was transferred to the Metropolitan line Uxbridge service, and some O and P Stock, reformed into 5-car trains transferred to replace the trains on the Circle line; these began running in 1947. Because of the reliability of the metadynes and difficulties repairing them, one Circle line train was converted to use the pneumatic camshaft control (PCM) equipment used on the 1938 tube stock and entered service in March 1955. This was considered a success and the other Circle line trains were converted, followed by the units that operated the Hammersmith & City services. The converted trains were known as CO/CP stock, and the trailers COP stock. In 1959/60, the length of the Circle line trains was increased to six cars with the addition of converted Q38 trailers, and with similar trains running on the Hammersmith & City and Circle lines maintenance for the stock for the two lines was concentrated at Hammersmith depot, allowing Neasden depot to specialise in the new A Stock.

In the early 1960s, the remaining O and P Stock trains that operated the Uxbridge service, still with their metadyne controls, were converted and transferred to the District line as the second batch of A Stock was introduced. In the 1960s the Hammersmith & City and Circle line services were generally operated by CO stock and CP stock used on the District line. In the early 1970s, the introduction of the C69 Stock allowed the CO Stock to be transferred to the District line and instead of running 6-car trains off-peak and 8-cars during peak hours, trains were reformed into standard 7-car trains, except on the Edgware Road - Wimbledon services, where 6-car trains continued to operate due to short platforms.

=== Experiments ===
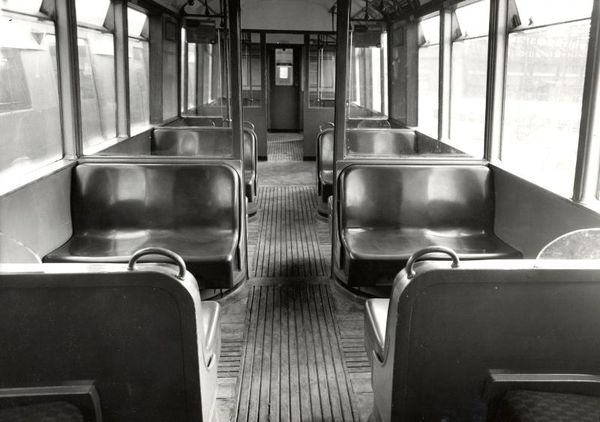
CP Stock trailer with injection moulded plastic seats

In 1967, London Underground experimented with injection moulded plastic seats in the centre of CP Stock trailer 014082, in an attempt to address the then-emerging problem with vandalism. The London Underground did not pursue the idea further, because passengers considered them to be uncomfortable, but vandal-resistant plastic seats became common on many metro systems, such as Algiers, Barcelona (TMB lines), New York City and Shanghai. Trailer 014082 kept the plastic seats until it was scrapped in 1971.

== Withdrawal and preservation ==
The introduction of C77 stock on the Edgware Road services in the late 1970s allowed some CO/CP Stock cars to be scrapped, and from January 1980 the remainder was replaced by new D78 stock. The last trains ran in service in 1981, when two six-car trains operated special workings.

One complete unit DM 53028, T 013063 and DM 54233 has been preserved at the Buckinghamshire Railway Centre. The driving motor 54233 was the one that was rebuilt using one end of a Q38 trailer in 1941.

A DM 54256 was also preserved at the Walthamstow Pumphouse Museum but moved to Whitwell & Reepham railway station after a clearout of many of the museum's items, and now is privately owned in an undisclosed location in Essex.

Vehicles 53028 and 013063 are CO Stock and 54233 and 54256 are CP Stock.

== Numbering ==
As built the numbers were as follows:

'O' Stock
'A' DM	'D' DM	T
13000 - 13057	14000 - 14057	013058 - 013086; 014058 - 014086

'P' Stock
'A' DM	'D' DM	T
13193 - 13257; 13262 - 13269*	14193 - 14257; 14262 - 14269	013087 - 013101; 013258 - 013261; 013270 - 013273; 014087 - 014100; 014258 - 014261; 014270 - 014273

Cars 13264 - 13269 were designated P1 stock.
