= London Underground engineering stock =

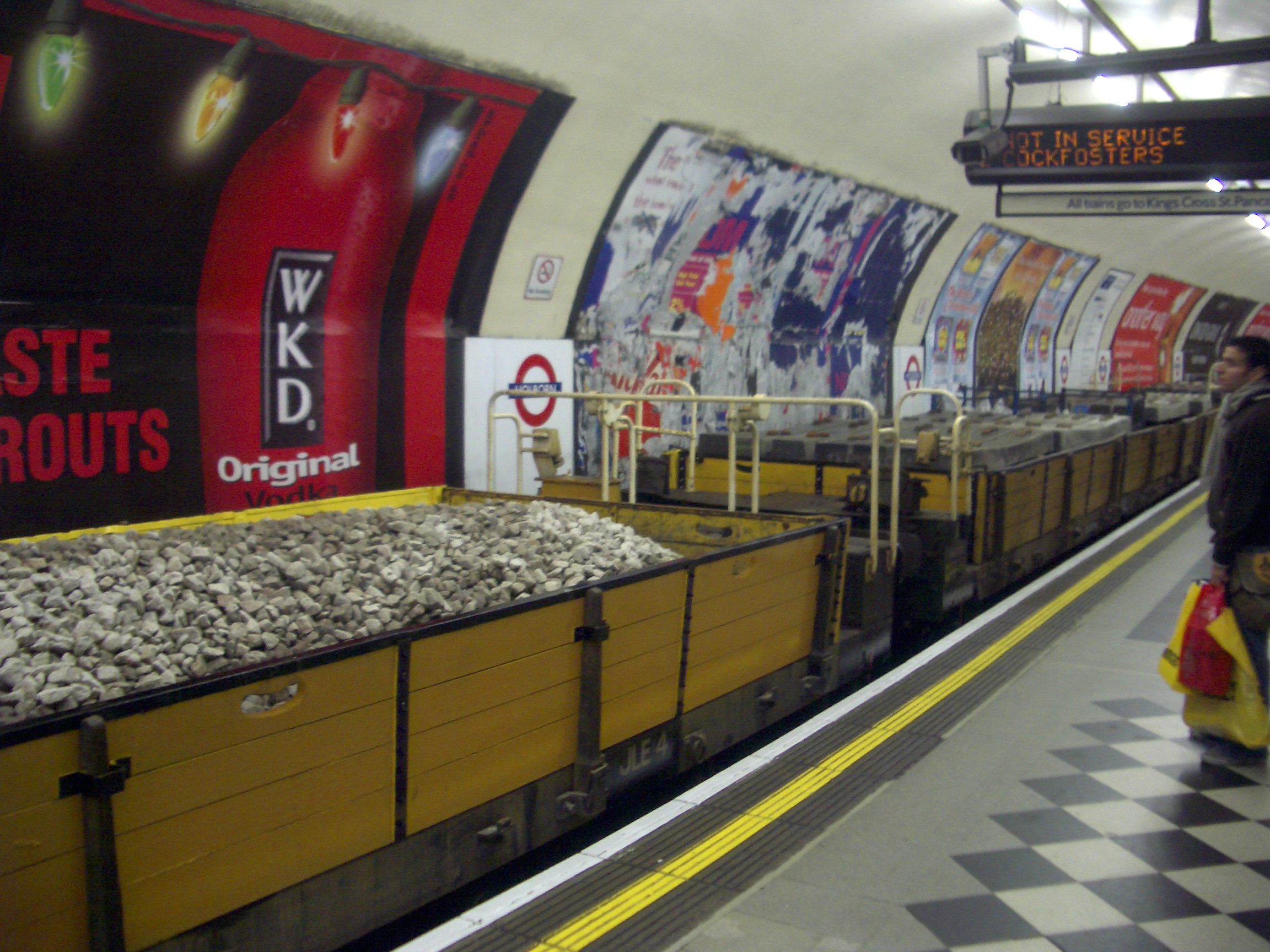
- A train carrying track ballast and sleepers passes through Holborn
- Stock type: Deep-level tube

Over the years, London Underground has acquired various types of engineering stock to help with the construction of new lines and maintenance of existing lines. Some of these wagons were inherited from its predecessors, many were built new and some were acquired second-hand from the main-line railways. Several types of specialist wagons have been used, which are described below.

== Overview ==
London Underground uses a numbering system comprising the wagon number prefixed with a letter which designates the wagon's type. These are summarised below.

Prefix	Type	Description
B	Brake van	Manned wagon used for guard's accommodation and for braking purposes. No longer used.
BW	Ballast wagon	Open wagon for transporting track ballast
C	Crane	Powerful crane for track laying/lifting and/or recovering de-railed rolling stock
DEC	Diesel-electric crane	Powerful crane for track laying/lifting and/or recovering de-railed rolling stock
DHC	Diesel-hydraulic crane	Powerful crane for track laying/lifting and/or recovering de-railed rolling stock
CM	Cement mixer wagon	Specialist flat wagon, with a cement mixer. These wagons have been modified and now form part of Tubelines's DISAB ballast sucking machines.
CW	Cable drum wagon	A short wagon for transporting cable drums through deep level tunnels. For signal wiring
F	Flat wagon	Flat wagon, for transport of rails or sleepers Now only used in train formation with tampers 771, 772 and 773.
FB	Flat brake	Flat wagon, with brake van compartment. No longer used.
GP	General purpose wagon	General purpose wagon
HD	High deck wagon	to carry a stack of track panels no more than 4 panels high.
HW	Hopper wagon	Hopper, for transport of fresh ballast
J	Jib carrier	Specialist flat wagon, for carrying the jib of a crane;
JC	Jib carrier	Specialist flat wagon, for carrying the jib of a crane;
JLE	Jubilee Line Extension	The same as General Purpose wagons (GP), used in the construction of the Jubilee Line Extension. The only difference is that the JLE's wagons have larger handbrake wheels.
MW	Match wagon	Wagons paired with the cement mixer wagons. Now used as GP wagons semi-permanently coupled together.
RW	Rail wagon	Specialist flat wagon, for transport of rails
SB	"Turbot" ballast wagon	Specialist ballast wagon, that will deliver ballast to the trackbed. Can also be used to transfer plant, used ballast or scrap.
TMM	Tamping machine	Ballast tamper for packing ballast to make lines more durable. Numbered 771, 772, 773 and 774. 771, 772 and 773 can only be transported through deep-level tunnels in train formation. 774 is for sub-surface lines only.
WPW	Well wagon	Specialist flat wagon, with lowered central section to enable larger loads to be carried. All have prefix JLE. Commonly known as a 'Low Loader'.
LWRT	Long Welded Rail Train	Used for the transportation of pre welded strings of 90m rail. Consists of 4 specially modified Rail Wagons and GP wagon which is configured into the centre of the train.

=== Brake vans ===
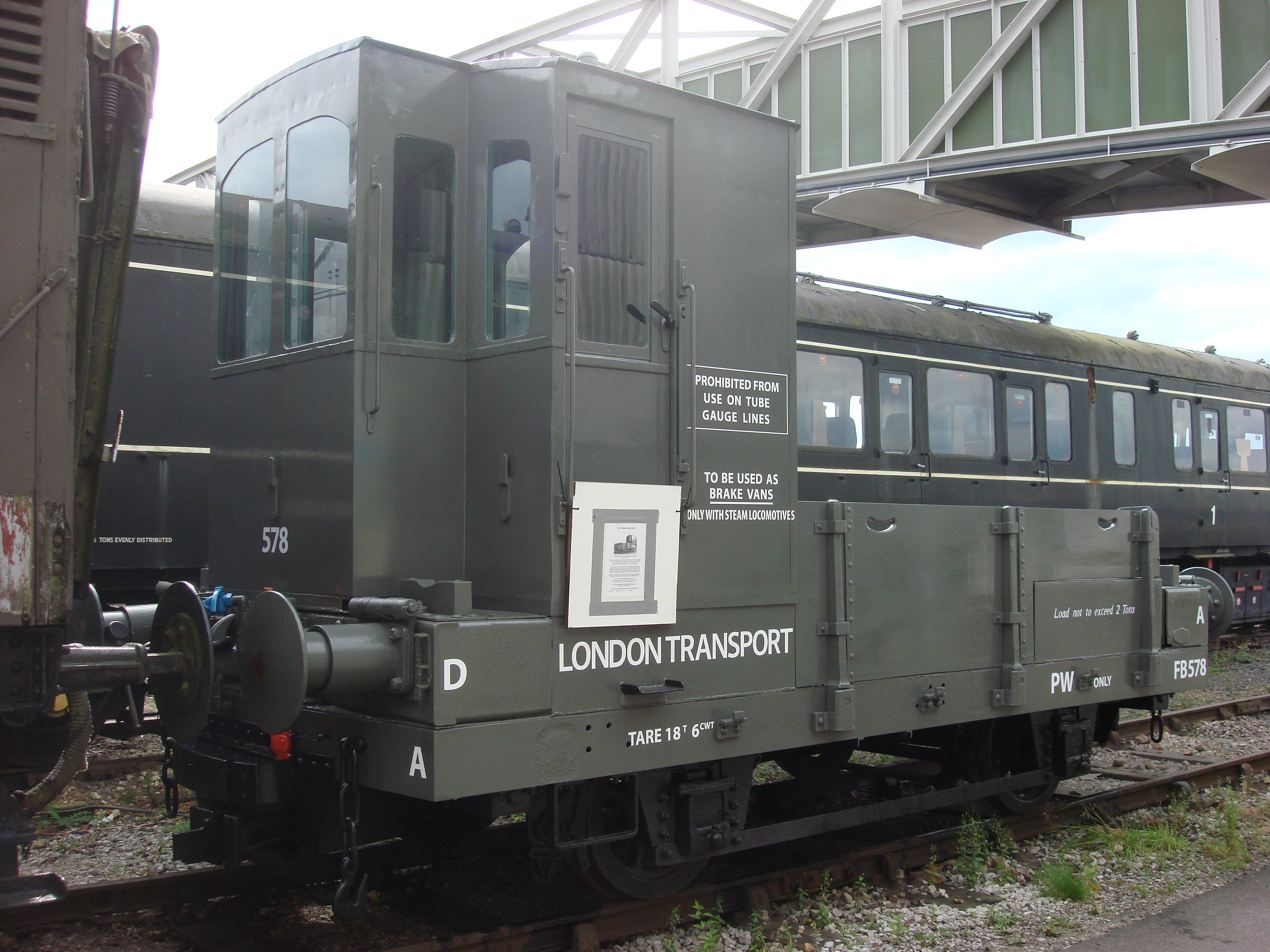
London Transport Flat Brake Van No. FB. 578

The London Underground has used various designs of brake van. They were used for the guard's accommodation and for braking purposes (when wagons in the train were not fitted with automatic brakes).

Two brake vans of interest were numbers FB578 and FB579. These were 'flat' brake vans, converted from flat wagons. The conversion consisted of building a small guard's compartment on one end of the flat wagon. Therefore, these wagons could be used for carrying small items, such as sleepers, in addition to their role as a brake van.

Six brake vans numbered B580–5 were built for London Transport by British Railways (BR) at the latter's Ashford Works in the early 1960s. They were built to a design which had been produced for BR since 1950 (BR Diagram 1/506 and 1/507), totalling 3588 units, and were the final examples of that design to be constructed.

== Stock list ==
Numbers	Built	Converted	Builder	Use	Notes
TLC1	1904	1948	?/London Transport	tunnel line cleaning wagon	converted from BW108
TLC2	1893	1948	?/London Transport	tunnel line cleaning wagon	converted from BW248
TCC1	1938	1972-77	Metro-Cammell/London Transport	DM-A	converted from 10226
TCC2	1938	1972-77	London Transport	dust extractor car	
TCC3	1938	1972-77	London Transport	heavy refuse car	
TCC4	1938	1972-77	London Transport	dust extractor car	
TCC5	1938	1972-77	Metro-Cammell/London Transport	DM-D	converted from 10087
BW4	1897			10-ton ballast wagon	
BW12	1893			10-ton ballast wagon	converted to MW518
BW21	1891			10-ton ballast wagon	
BW108	1904			10-ton ballast wagon	converted to TLC1
BW123	1900			10-ton ballast wagon	converted to MW541
BW182	1896			10-ton ballast wagon	converted to MW532
BW193	1897			10-ton ballast wagon	converted to MW540
BW203	1897			10-ton ballast wagon	converted to MW531
BW214	1897			10-ton ballast wagon	
BW245	1897			10-ton ballast wagon	
BW248	1893			10-ton ballast wagon	converted to TLC2
HW201-HW222	1981		WH Davis	30-ton bogie hopper wagon	
SB231-SB290	1982-88	1995	?/ABB	turbot wagon	
F303	1907			15-ton bogie flat wagon	
F304-F306	1964			10-ton 4-wheel flat wagon	
F308-F309	1925			flat wagon	converted to JC688/J689
F310-F315	1931			30-ton bogie flat wagon	F310 converted to J691
F316-F326	1935			30-ton bogie flat wagon	
F327	1935			flat wagon	converted to B578
F328-F329	1935			10-ton 4-wheel flat wagon	
F330	1935			flat wagon	converted to B579
F331-F340	1937			30-ton bogie flat wagon	
F341-F371	1951		Gloucester Railway Carriage & Wagon Company	30-ton bogie flat wagon	F355 permanently coupled with F351
F372-F375	1956			30-ton bogie flat wagon	
F376-F377	1959			30-ton bogie flat wagon	
F378-F383	1959			30-ton bogie flat wagon	
F384-F391	1965			30-ton bogie flat wagon	
F392-F398	1965-66		Ashford Works	30-ton bogie flat wagon	
HW400-HW406	1935			20-ton hopper wagon	
HW407-HW411	1938			20-ton hopper wagon	
HW412-HW434	1951			20-ton hopper wagon	
HW435-HW437	1965			20-ton hopper wagon	
RW454-RW459	1931			20-ton rail wagon	
RW460-RW465	1935			20-ton rail wagon	
RW466-RW475	1937			20-ton rail wagon	
RW476-RW487	1950			20-ton rail wagon	
RW48-8RW489	1951			20-ton rail wagon	
RW490-RW494	1958		Gloucester Railway Carriage & Wagon Company	20-ton rail wagon	
RW495-RW506	1965		Ashford Works	20-ton rail wagon	
MW518	1893			10-ton tube match wagon	converted from BW12
MW531	1897			10-ton tube match wagon	converted from BW203
MW532	1896			10-ton tube match wagon	converted from BW182
MW540	1897			10-ton surface match wagon	converted from BW193
MW541	1900			10-ton surface match wagon	converted from BW123
B555-B560	1935		Gloucester Railway Carriage & Wagon Company	20-ton brake van	
B578-B579	1935			18-ton brake van	converted from F327/F330
B580-B585	1962		Ashford Works	20-ton brake van	
C605	1925		Grafton Engineering Company	steam crane	
C606	1931		Ransome & Rapier	steam crane	
C616	1939		Butler & Company	steam crane	
DEC617	1955		Taylor & Hubbard	diesel-electric crane	
DEC618	1956		Taylor & Hubbard	diesel-electric crane	
C620	1926		Thomas Smith & Sons	steam crane	
C621	1935		Thomas Smith & Sons	steam crane	
DEC622	1964		Taylor & Hubbard	diesel-electric crane	
C623	1982		Cowans Sheldon	7.5-ton diesel crane	
C624-C626	1984		Cowans Sheldon	7.5-ton diesel crane	
DHC627	1986		Cowans Sheldon	10-ton twin-jib diesel crane	
DHC628	1993		Cowans Sheldon	10-ton twin-jib diesel crane	
G662	1906	1934	Metropolitan Amalgamated Railway Carriage & Wagon Company/London Transport	surface gauging car	
G663	1931	1963	Birmingham Railway Carriage & Wagon Company/London Transport	tube gauging car	converted from pre-1938 trailer 7131
TRC666	1973	1987	Metro-Cammell/London Transport	track recording car	converted from 514
J683	1937	1975	?/London Transport	jib carrier	converted from WPW1001
J684	1931			jib carrier	
JC688	1925			jib carrier	converted from F308
J689	1925			jib carrier	converted from F309
J691	1931			jib carrier	converted from F312
TW730	1932			tank wagon	
PBT761-PBT763	1966		Plasser & Theurer	ballast tamping machine	
PTL764	1973		Plasser & Theurer	lining machine	
SC765	1975		Plasser & Theurer	ballast tamping machine	
TMM771-TMM773	1980		Plasser & Theurer	track maintenance machine	
TMM774	2007		Plasser & Theurer	track maintenance machine	
TMM775-TMM776	2016		Matisa	track maintenance machine	Type B45 UE
RG802	1923	1956	Metro-Cammell/London Transport	tube gauging car	converted from pre-1938 trailer 75241; originally control trailer 5241
RG803	1923	1956	Metro-Cammell/London Transport	tube gauging car	converted from pre-1938 trailer 75245; originally control trailer 5245
RW801-RW826	1986		Procor Engineering	20-ton rail wagon	
PC850-PC851	1931	1965	Birmingham Railway Carriage & Wagon Company/London Transport	personnel carrier	converted from pre-1938 trailer 7061/7063
PC852	1931	1966	Birmingham Railway Carriage & Wagon Company/London Transport	personnel carrier	converted from pre-1938 trailer 7080
PC854	1931	1966	Gloucester Railway Carriage & Wagon Company/London Transport	personnel carrier	converted from pre-1938 trailer 7158
PC855	1931	1966	Birmingham Railway Carriage & Wagon Company/London Transport	personnel carrier	converted from pre-1938 trailer 7071
PC856	1927	1972	Metro Cammell Weymann/London Transport	personnel carrier	converted from pre-1938 trailer 70518
HD871-HD876		1987	Procor Engineering	40-ton high-deck wagon	
GP901-GP941	1985		Procor Engineering	30-ton general purpose wagon	
CM950-CM955	1985		Procor Engineering	cement mixer	
MW956-MW960	1985		Procor Engineering	match wagon	
990				ballast hopper	Docklands Light Railway (DLR); originally numbered 100
992				CT30 crane	DLR; originally numbered 92
993				battery locomotive	DLR; originally numbered 93
994			GEC-Alsthom	diesel locomotive	DLR; originally numbered 94
995			Ruston	diesel locomotive	DLR; originally numbered 95
996				flat wagon	DLR; originally numbered 96
997			Freightliner	flat wagon	DLR; originally numbered 97
998			Freightliner	3-plank wagon	DLR; originally numbered 98
999			Freightliner	flat wagon	DLR; originally numbered 99
WPW1000	1937			diesel generator wagon	generator removed
CW1050-CW1052	1940			cable drum wagon	
CW1053-CW1055	1996		Bombardier	cable well wagon	
98401	1988		Permaquip	track maintenance machine	acquired from Network SouthEast (W&C), 1994
JLE1-JLE15	1994		Bombardier	general purpose wagon	transferred from Jubilee Line Extension (JLE)
JLE16-JLE19	1994		Bombardier	bogie well wagon	transferred from JLE
JLE20-JLE23	1994		Bombardier	4-wheel cable drum wagon	transferred from JLE

All data from London Underground Rolling Stock, 1st through 15th editions.

=== Preserved units ===
Number	Built	Builder	Location
BW4	1897		Buckinghamshire Railway Centre
DT81			London Underground Ltd.
DT82			London Underground Ltd.
BW214	1897	Metropolitan Railway	London Transport Museum - Acton depot
F362	1951	Gloucester Railway Carriage & Wagon Company	London Underground Ltd.
F384	1965	Ashford Works	London Underground Ltd.
HW402	1935		Swanage Railway
HW418	1951	Gloucester Railway Carriage & Wagon Company	Buckinghamshire Railway Centre
HW421	1935	Gloucester Railway Carriage & Wagon Company	Colne Valley Railway
HW426	1951	Gloucester Railway Carriage & Wagon Company	North Norfolk Railway
HW429	1951	Gloucester Railway Carriage & Wagon Company	North Norfolk Railway
HW433	1951		Lavender Line
HW435	1965	Shildon Works	Isle of Wight Steam Railway
HW437	1965	Shildon Works	Isle of Wight Steam Railway
RW479	1950	Gloucester Railway Carriage & Wagon Company	London Underground Ltd.
B557	1935	Hurst Nelson	Buckinghamshire Railway Centre
B558	1935	Hurst Nelson	London Underground Ltd.
B560	1935	Hurst Nelson	Spa Valley Railway
FB578	1950	Gloucester Railway Carriage & Wagon Company	Buckinghamshire Railway Centre
B580	1965	Ashford Works	London Underground Ltd.
B583	1965	Ashford Works	London Underground Ltd.
B584	1965	Ashford Works	London Underground Ltd.
B585	1965	Ashford Works	London Underground Ltd.
B586	1965	Ashford Works	Epping Ongar Railway
C619	1914	Cowans Sheldon	Buckinghamshire Railway Centre
C621	1935	Thomas Smith & Sons	Museum of London
DEC622	1964	Taylor & Hubbard	Spa Valley Railway
JC689	1925/1952	/London Transport	Spa Valley Railway
J690			Buckinghamshire Railway Centre
TV751			Rutland Railway Museum
PBT762	1966	Plasser & Theurer	Southern Steam Trust
PTL764			Severn Valley Railway
PC850	1931/1966	Birmingham Railway Carriage & Wagon Company/London Transport	London Underground Ltd.
PC851	1931/1966	Birmingham Railway Carriage & Wagon Company/London Transport	London Underground Ltd.
PC855	1931/1966	Birmingham Railway Carriage & Wagon Company/London Transport	London Underground Ltd.
WPW1000	1938/1976	/London Transport	London Underground Ltd.

== Gallery ==
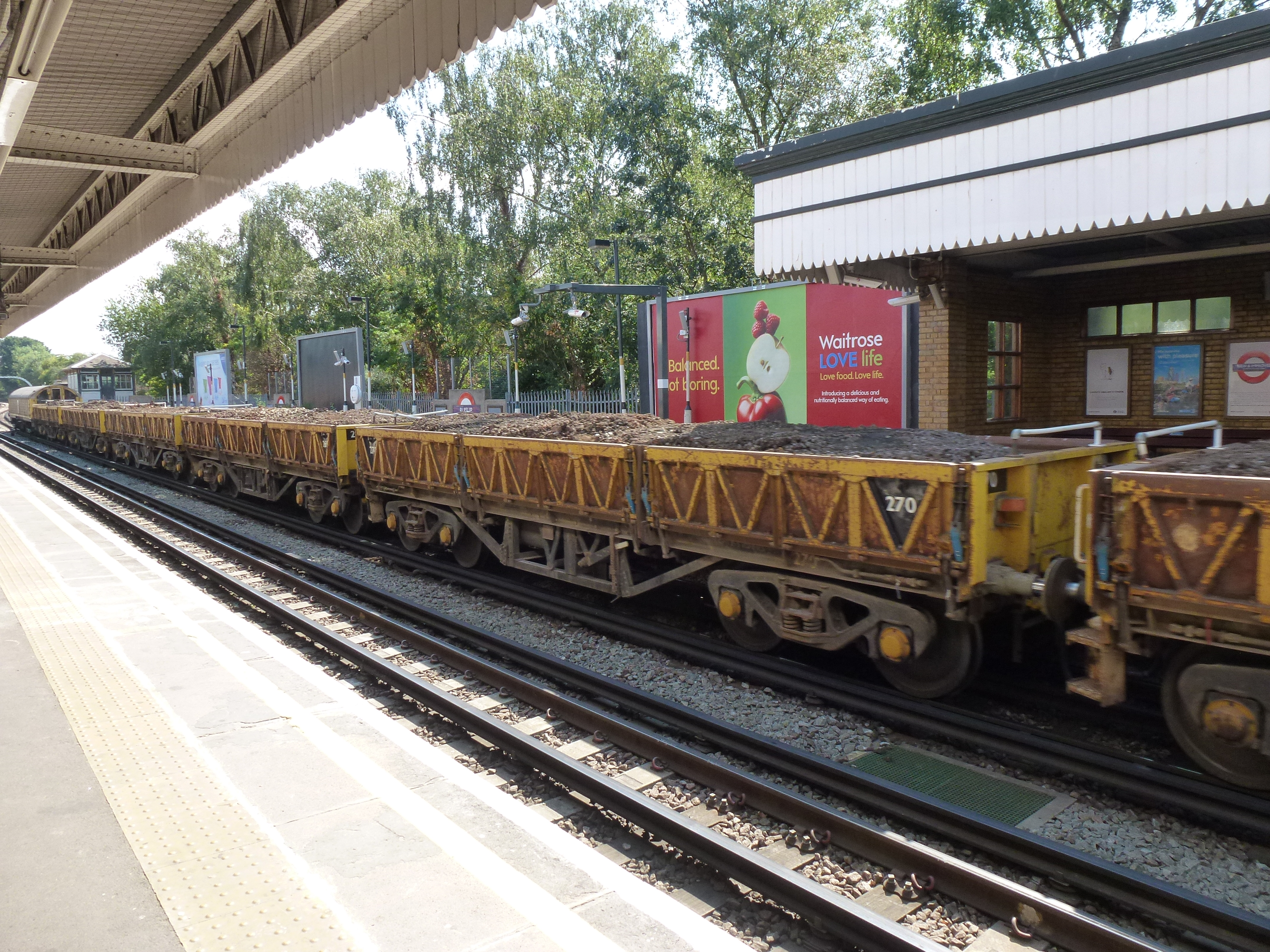
An engineering train composed of 'SB' wagons passes through Ruislip tube station westbound on tracks shared by the Metropolitan and Piccadilly lines in July 2011. The cargo appeared to be old ballast.

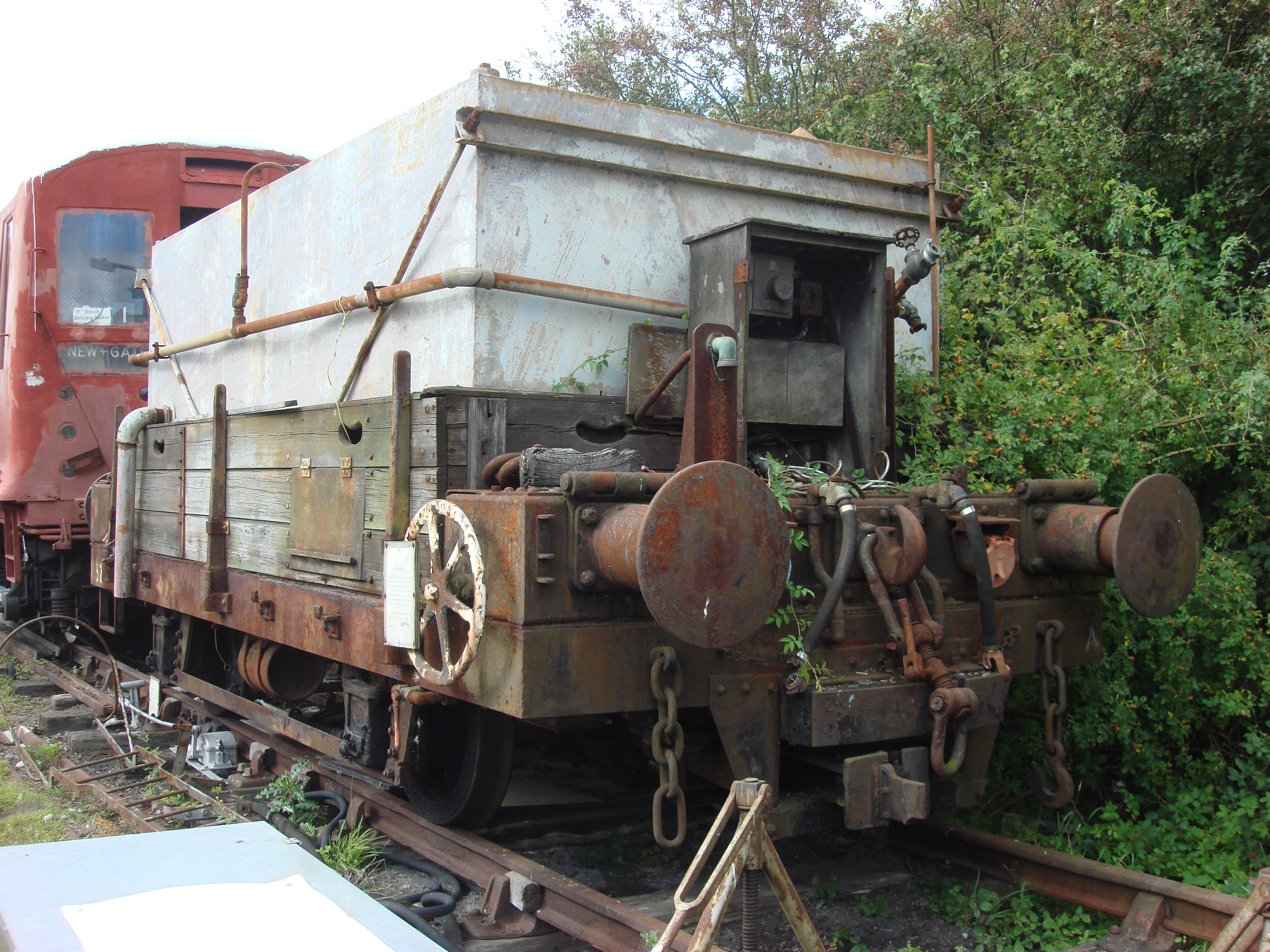
Preserved 10-ton Air Braked four-wheel freight wagon F. 329.

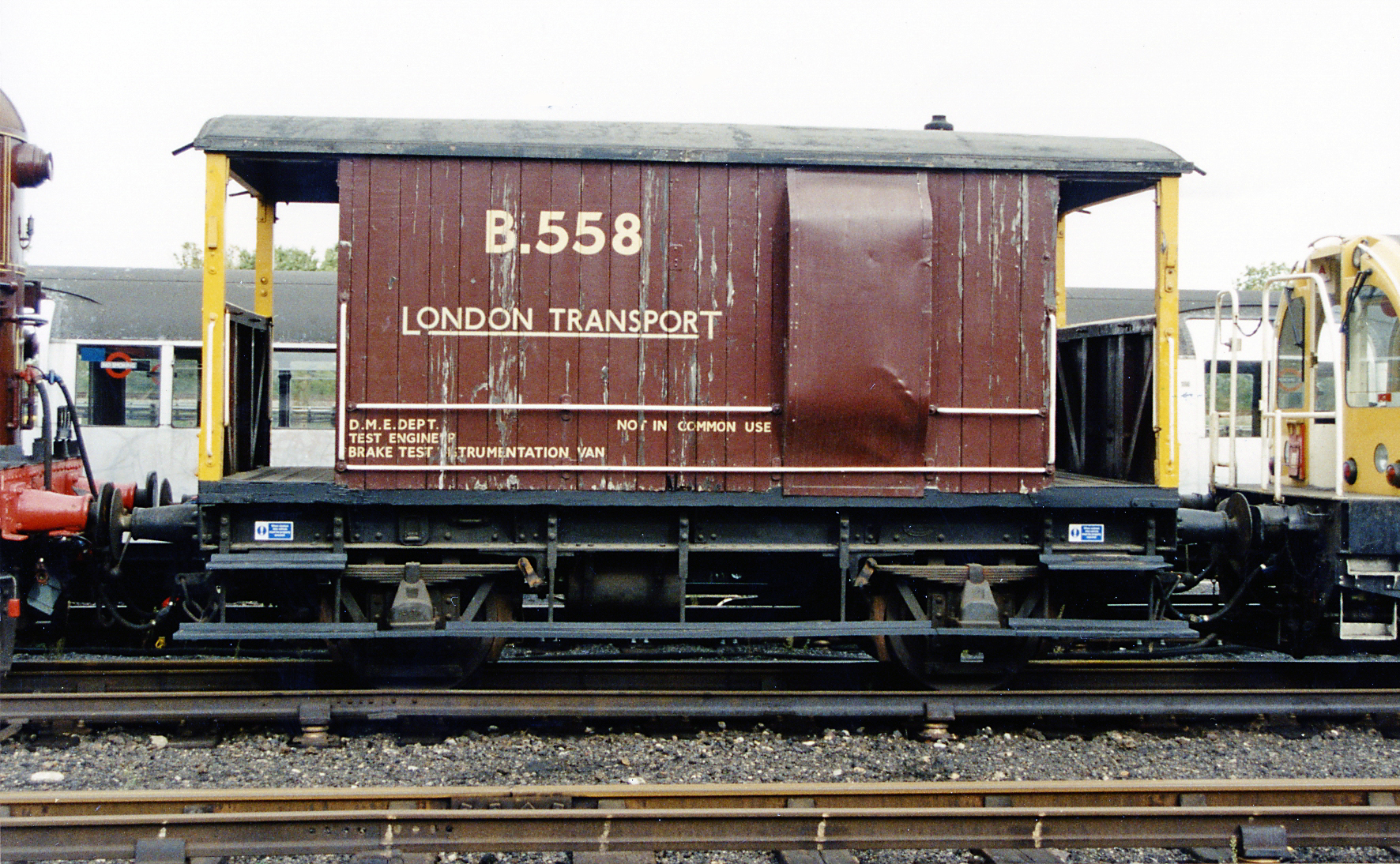
Brake Van B558 at Ruislip depot, modified for use as a brake test instrumentation van.

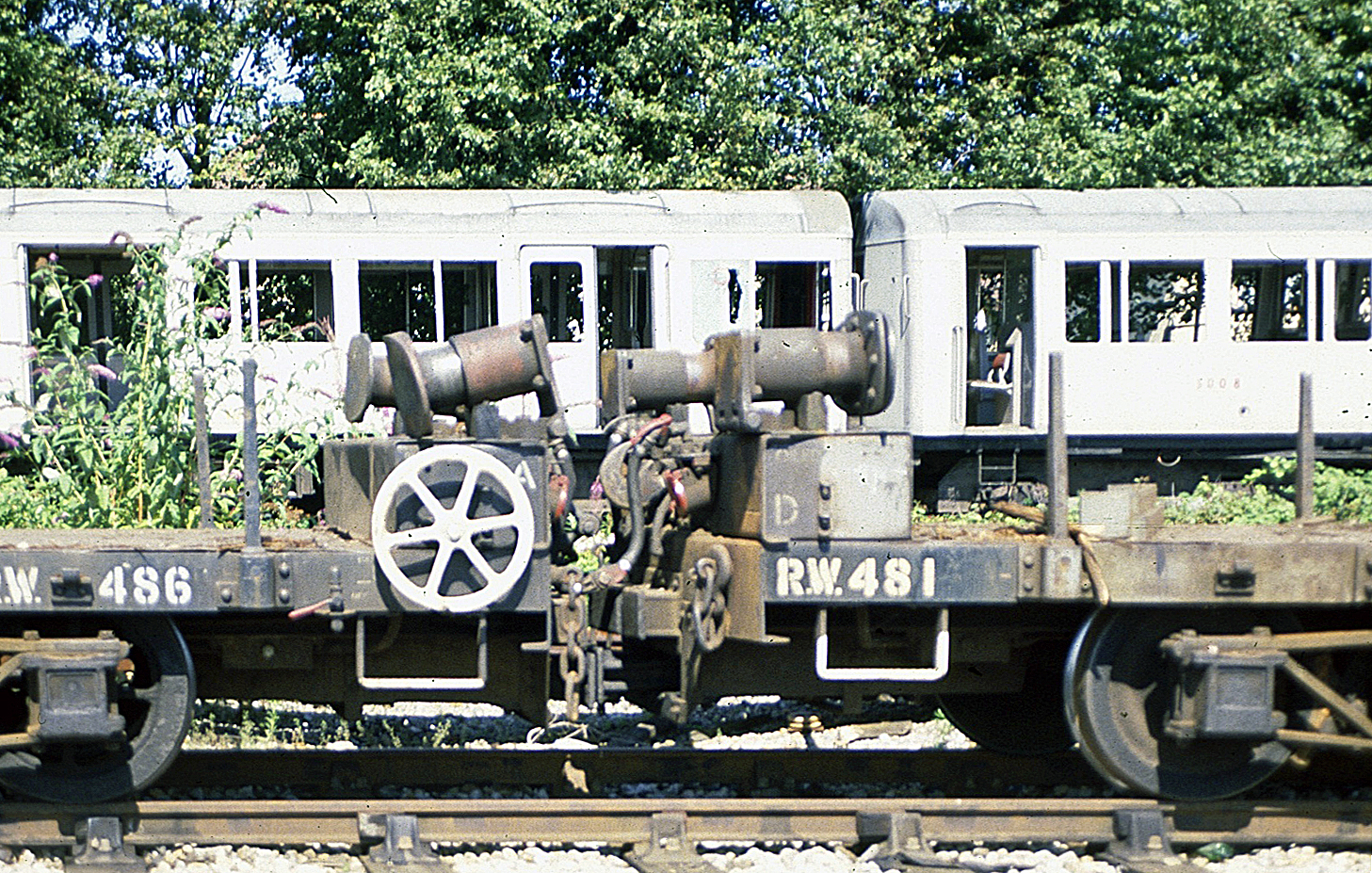
A pair of 4xx-series 'RW' bolster wagons at Neasden, with some derelict A Stock behind.

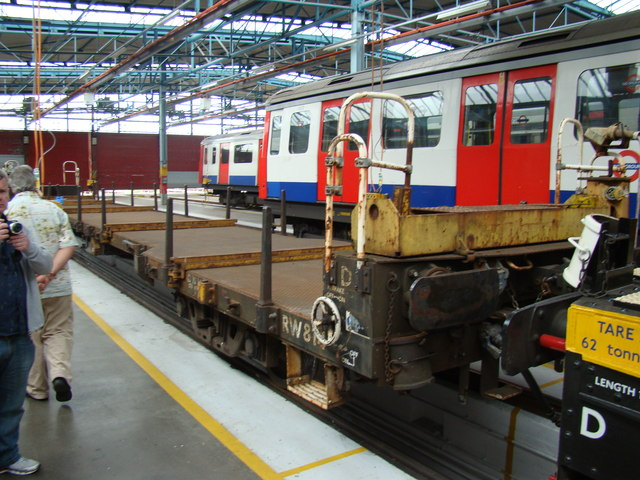
Rail wagon RW814, a bogie flat wagon for carrying rails.

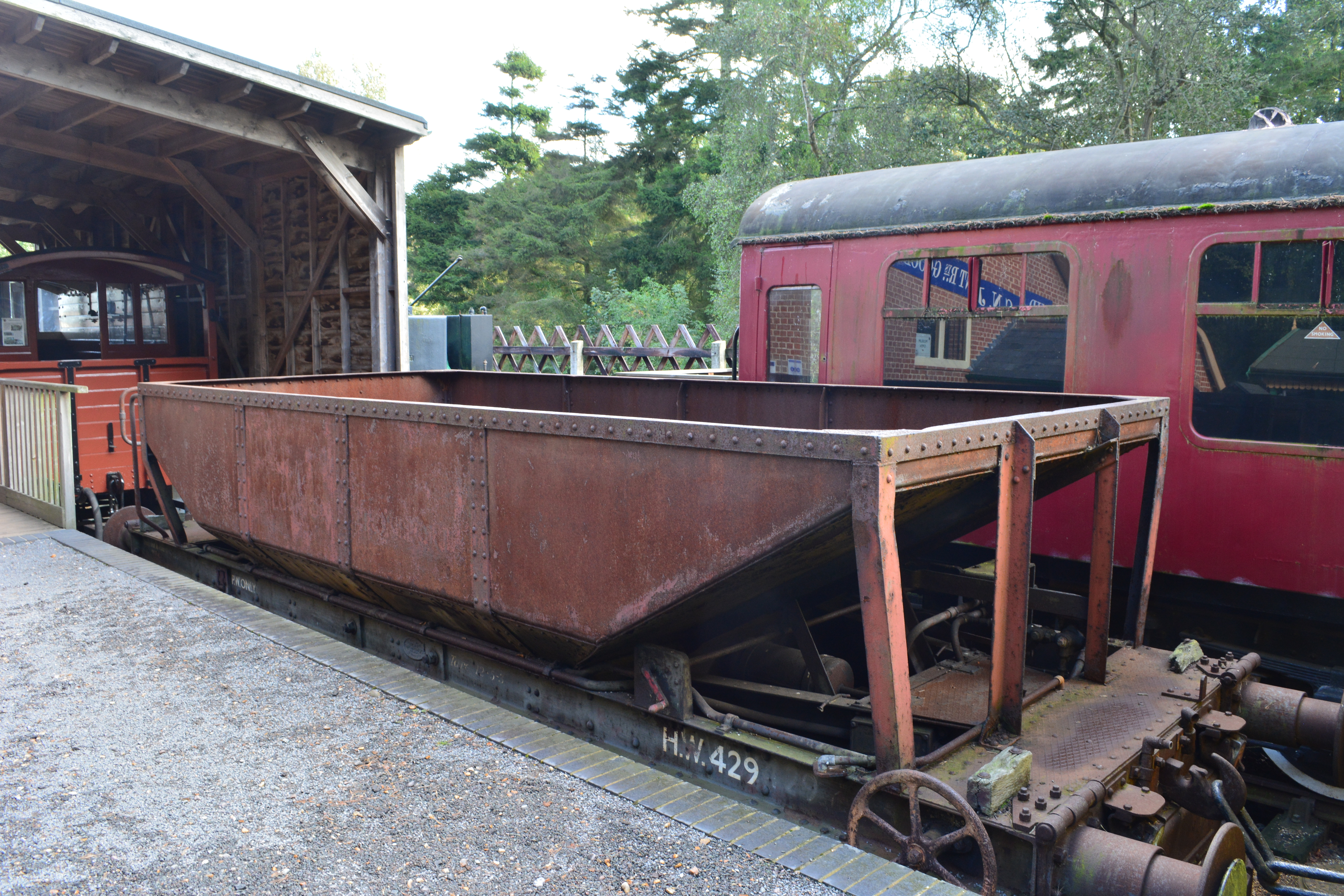
HW429, 1951 London Underground engineering 20T hopper wagon preserved at North Norfolk Railway
