= Steam crane =

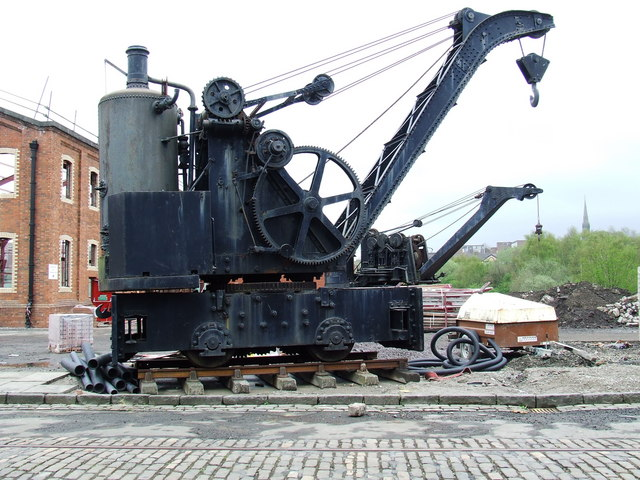
Railway steam crane, with vertical cross-tube boiler, at Summerlee Heritage Park

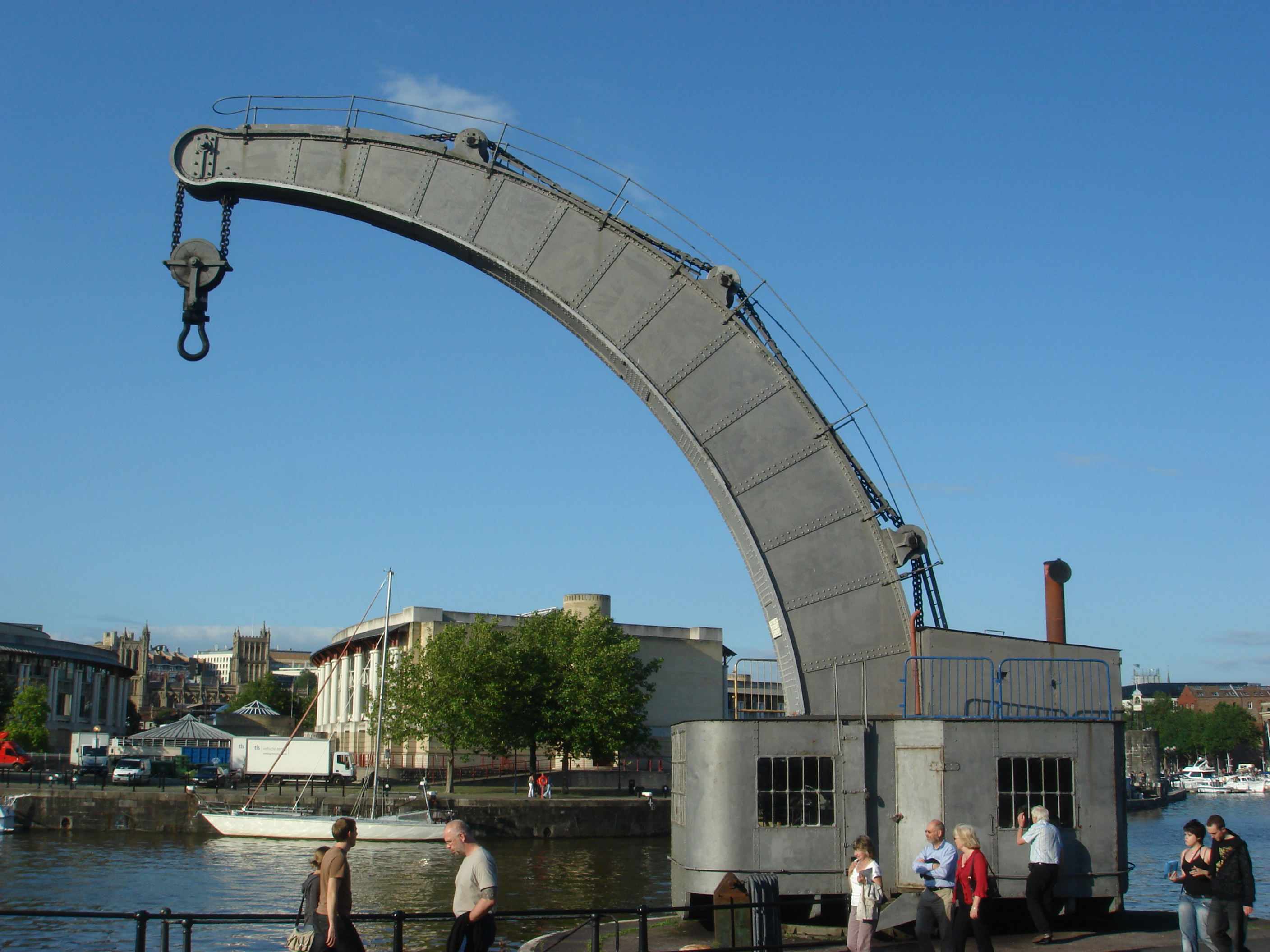
Fairbairn steam crane in Bristol

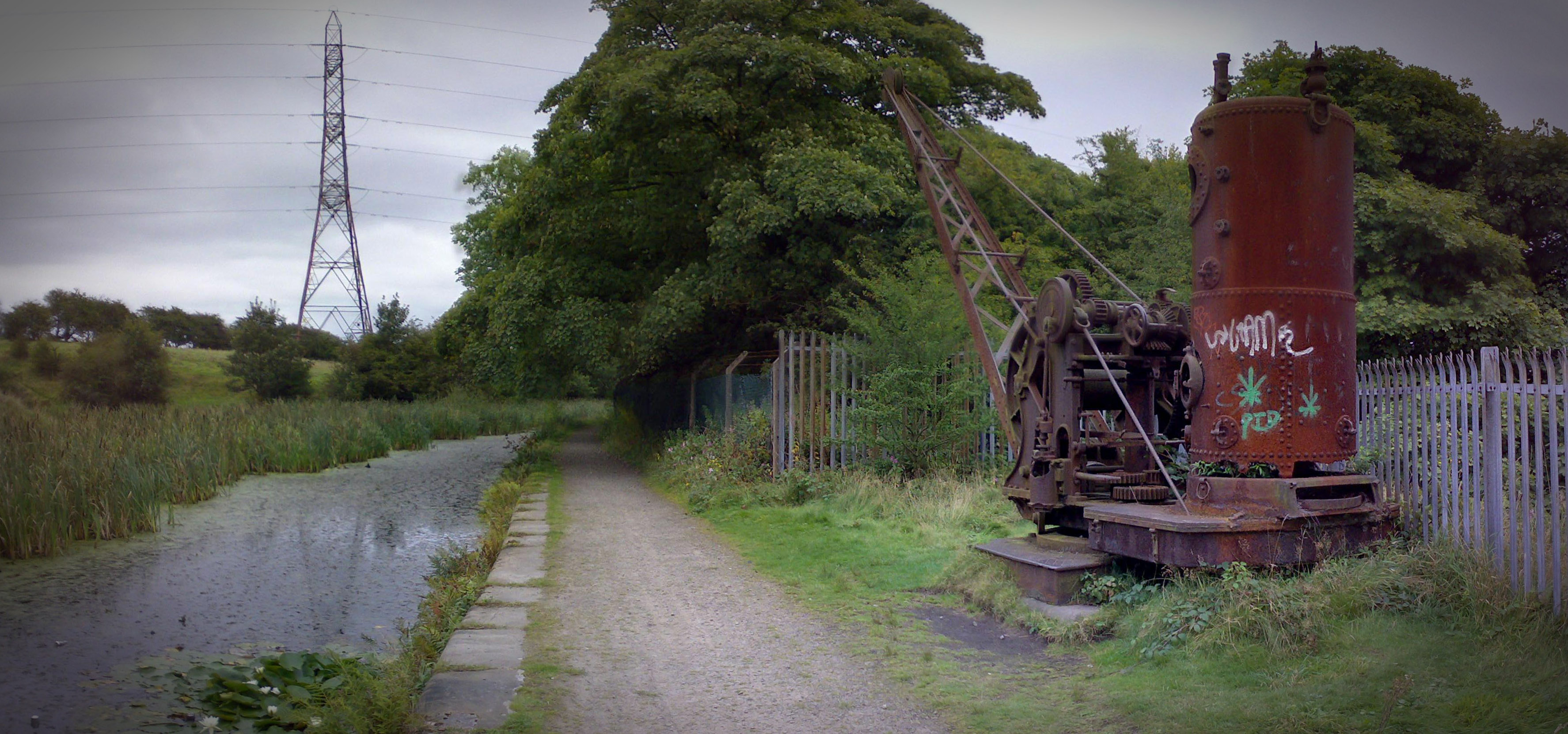
Derelict Smith (Rodley) crane, on the Manchester, Bolton and Bury Canal

A steam crane is a crane powered by a steam engine. It may be fixed or mobile and, if mobile, it may run on rail tracks, caterpillar tracks, road wheels, or be mounted on a barge. It usually has a vertical boiler placed at the back so that the weight of the boiler counterbalances the weight of the jib and load.

They were very common as railway breakdown cranes, and several have been preserved on heritage railways in the United Kingdom.

== Manufacturers ==
- Black Hawthorn of Gateshead (unrestored example at Beamish Museum
- Joseph Booth & Bros of Leeds
- Coles Cranes of Derby (restored example at Beamish Museum)
- Cowans, Sheldon & Company of Carlisle (rail cranes)
- Craven Brothers
- William Fairbairn & Sons of Manchester
- Ransomes & Rapier of Ipswich
- Ruston Proctor of Lincoln
- Stothert & Pitt of Bath
- Thomas Smith & Sons (Rodley) Ltd. of Leeds

== See also ==
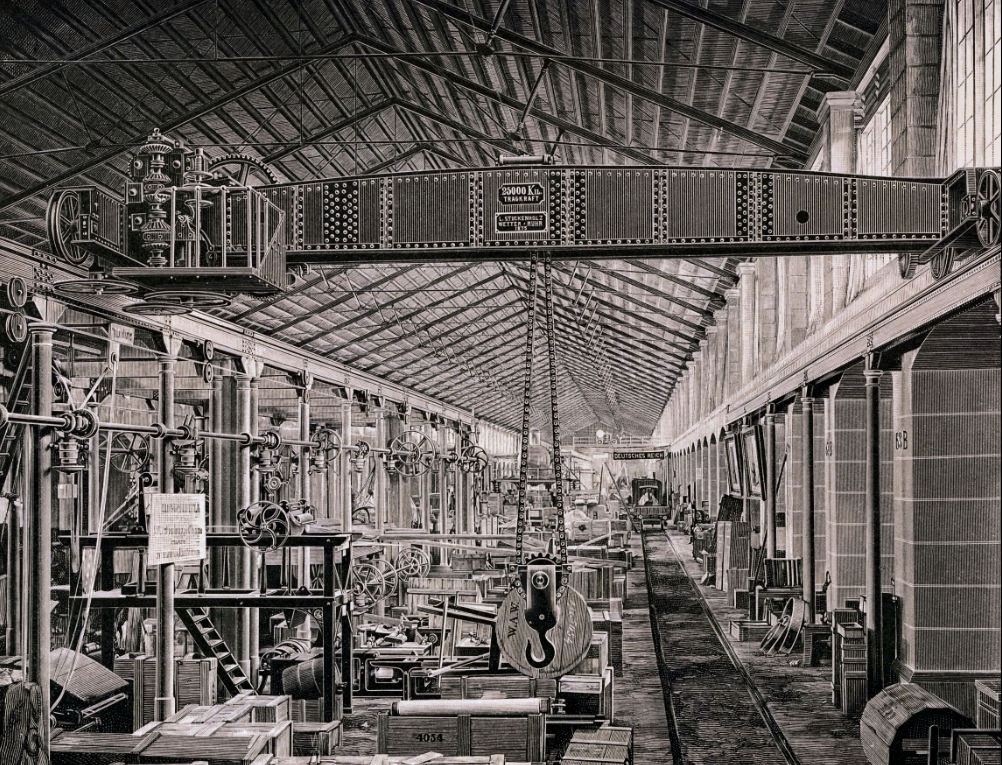
Steam powered Overhead crane from 1875

- Crane
- Crane (railroad)
- Crane tank
- Fairbairn steam crane
- Steam engine
- Steam shovel
