= Joseph Booth & Bros =

English manufacturer of cranes

Joseph Booth & Bros was an English company notable for making cranes used in large construction projects.

== History ==
Jeremiah Booth, the father of Joseph Booth, entered the crane making business with partners Jeremiah Balmforth and David Smith. They had established their business in the Calverley area of Leeds in 1820 and were joined by Jeremiah Booth in 1833. The company made machinery for mills, and from 1840 their range included hand-operated cranes. In 1847 Jeremiah Booth left and established his own crane making company at the 'Union Foundry' in Rodley, West Yorkshire. The works was situated on a narrow strip of land between Town Street and the Leeds and Liverpool Canal. In 1855 the company passed to Jeremiah Booth's son Joseph, and the name Joseph Booth & Bros was adopted. For most of the company's history, it operated alongside the 'Old Foundry' of Thomas Smith & Sons, Thomas Smith being the son of the David Smith who had formerly been in partnership with Jeremiah Booth.

== Products ==
During the Victorian era a number of factors led to large demand for cranes, particularly the number of major construction projects being undertaken and the large volumes of goods to lift in factories, railways and canals.
Railways, docks, canals and construction sites used large numbers of small steam cranes, either mounted on quays or on railway wheels so they could be moved around site, usually four wheels but occasionally more for larger cranes. A number of local firms in Leeds produced quite similar designs with the jib and boiler counterbalanced around a tall column pivot. These very stable machines are often referred to as 'Leeds Type' cranes.

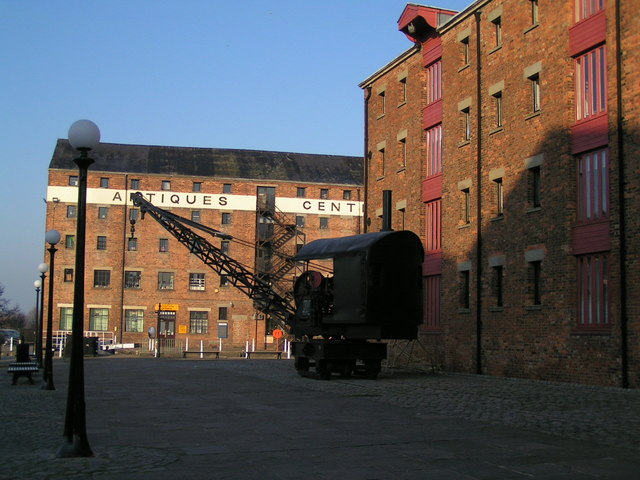
Joseph Booth steam crane on Gloucester Docks

Significant construction sites to use Booths cranes include the Tower Bridge, as this had a great deal of metal framework many cranes were required in its construction. The steam cranes used in the Tower Bridge construction have been included in scenes from the 2009 Sherlock Holmes film. One less successful project to employ Booths cranes was the Wembley Park Tower project. The Wembley Park Tower was meant to be London's rival to the Eiffel Tower in Paris but was however dogged by financial problems. In 1902 the Railway Magazine commented "If the Wembley Tower Company could have raised the money as quickly as these cranes raised the girders, the growth of the tower would not have ceased so abruptly." A less glamorous project was the Northern Outfall Sewer in London however company advertising of the time mentioned that their cranes could be seen at work here.

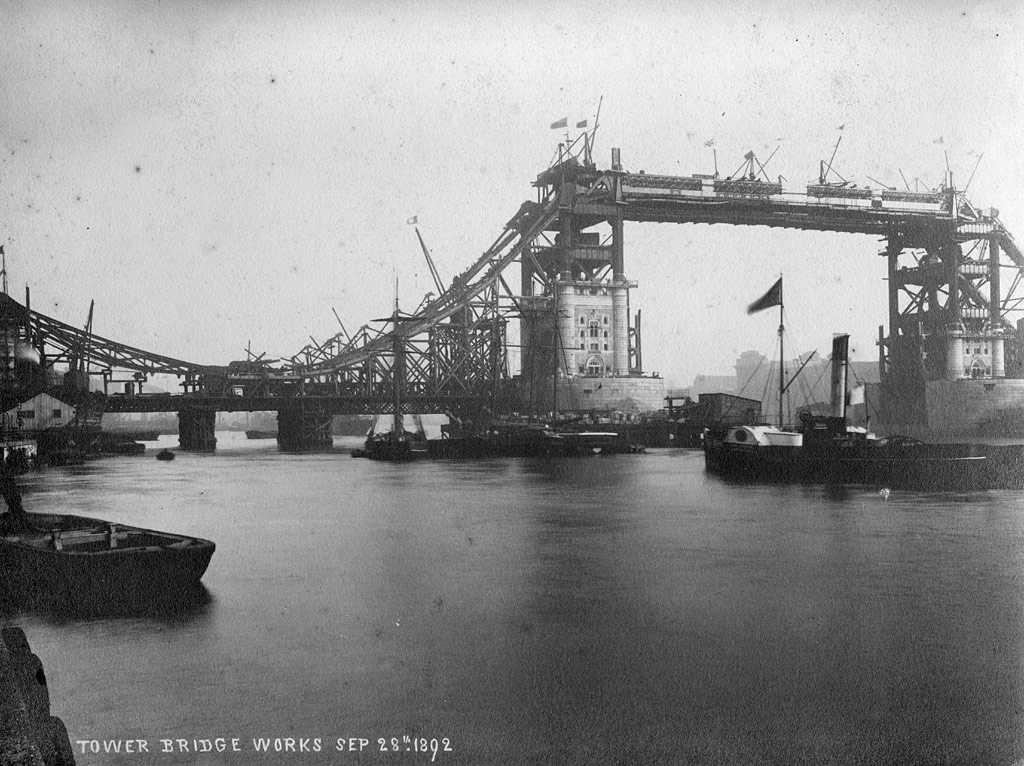
Tower Bridge under construction in 1892, note the large numbers of cranes required for this job

Some larger rail mounted cranes were produced for the railways for use as breakdown cranes and in the Civil Engineering departments. A particularly well known examples of these being the ten 8 wheel cranes supplied to BR's Western Region in 1958/59 as these became well known to many railway modellers as a result of the kit that was available from Airfix, Booths helped Airfix produce this model by supplying various plans to the firm. Other railway civil engineering cranes include those used to build the Lower Zambezi Bridge From 1898 Booths were producing electrically powered cranes. Producing the motors in house the components were also put to use in other products. Booths produced battery locomotives for mines and industry under the 'Union' brandname. and battery trucks and tractors for factories. As well as complete cranes the company produced winches and hoists which found many uses in the factories of the time From 1875 onwards Booths made large numbers of overhead cranes for use in factories. The Sultan of Morocco had a Booths crane and this was put to use lifting the stills used for the production of perfumes for the palace harem. In later years as the railways declined overhead cranes became the bulk of the business and sales of rail mounted cranes declined.

== Mergers ==
The company went into liquidation in the 1920s depression and was bought by John Baker (1920) Ltd. In 1937 the firm was merged with Clyde Crane and Engineering Co of Mossend, Lanarkshire, forming Clyde Crane & Booth Ltd. In 1961 the group acquired Carlisle firm Cowans & Sheldon & Co Ltd and Leeds Engineering & Hydraulic Co Ltd. 1969 saw the UK's three biggest crane companies merge, Clyde Crane & Booth Ltd, Sir William Arrol & Co Ltd and Wellman Cranes forming the Crane and Bridge Division of Clarke Chapman. Clarke Chapman merged with Reyrolle Parsons to form Northern Engineering Industries in 1977 and in 1978 took over Booth's neighbours Thomas Smith & Sons. NEI was taken over by Rolls-Royce plc in 1989 and took over another crane maker, Stothert & Pitt of Bath, before Langley Holdings plc took over this part of Rolls-Royce plc in 2000.

== Today ==
Overhead cranes are still made under the Wellman Booth name, part of the Clarke Chapman group of companies. The Rodley works has closed, the site now a housing development, however the company still has its offices in Leeds but now in the Yeadon area. The engineering work takes place in Gateshead and the company supplies large numbers of cranes for factories. Some of the largest customers for Wellman Booths cranes include the nuclear and steel industries.
Many cranes produced by Joseph Booth have been preserved, (amongst other places) their rail mounted cranes can be found at the Middleton Railway, Armley Mills and Gloucester Docks. Overhead cranes are preserved at industrial museums including Kelham Island Museum and Twyford Waterworks.
