= Taylor & Hubbard =

Taylor & Hubbard was an engineering company founded in Leicester, specialising in the production of railway cranes. They later moving to Kent Street, Humberstone Road, Leicester, in approximately 1900 which gave them access to the railway siding. The company was founded in 1896 and up to the 1960s made steam cranes for railway companies in both the UK and around the world, mainly in the British Empire. By the 1960s they were making diesel-electric cranes for British Railways and hydraulic cranes for the Admiralty. Their cranes were used on oil tankers, and they sold dockside cranes for the Thames Conservancy.

Taylor & Hubbard were taken over in the early 1960s by F. H. Lloyd & Co., Ltd, and in the late 1960s or early 1970s the Leicester site was closed and the work moved to the West Midlands. Early 70's? I visited the Taylor Hubbard foundry as a toolmaking apprentice in 1977

Tim Bodington, a resident from Leicester reports the following information: "My grandfather William Cowell Taylor sold the company to F.H.Lloyd & Co in 1964. I remember well his telling me that the tax he paid was 19/11 on the last £ he earned so what was the point? He had employed 200 people and many of them were recent immigrants mainly from Mepore in Pakistan. I went round the works in 1963 and saw the steel parts being moulded in sand, the steel was handpoured. Grandfather made all of his model cranes in original Meccano models with wooden coverings and I still have some of those Meccano parts. W.C. Taylor died in February 1982." Tim Boddington 23022017.
