= Buckinghamshire Railway Centre =

Railway museum in England

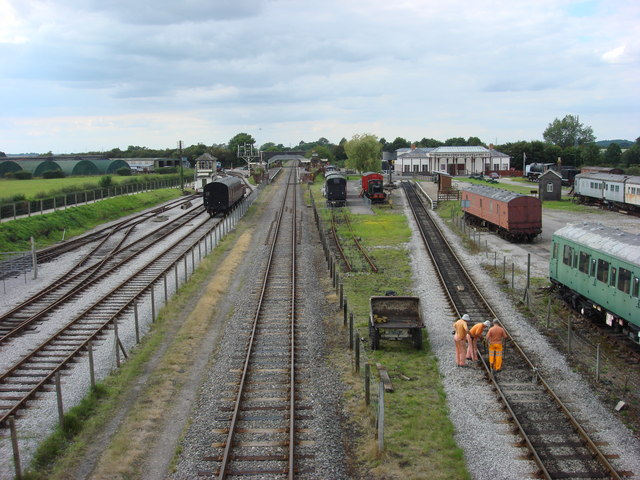
- View along the main line towards Quainton Road, showing the two sides of the centre, taken from the footbridge. Main buildings, from left-right: Ministry of Food Buffer Depot; Brill Tramway platform; Quainton Road; the former building of Oxford Rewley Road
- Established: 1969
- Coordinates: 51.865°N 0.929°W
- Type: Operational railway museum
- Key holdings: Metropolitan Railway E Class No.1; GWR 4073 Class No.5080 Defiant; GWR 6959 Class No.6989 Wightwick Hall; South African Class 25NC 4-8-4 No.3405
- Owner: Quainton Railway Society (Some land leased from Network Rail)
- Public transit access: Quainton Road or Aylesbury
- Website: BucksRailCentre.org

Buckinghamshire Railway Centre is a railway museum operated by the Quainton Railway Society Ltd. at Quainton Road railway station, about 5 miles (8.0 km) west of Aylesbury in Buckinghamshire, England. The site is divided into two halves which are joined by two foot-bridges, one of which provides wheelchair access. Each side has a demonstration line with various workshop buildings as well as museum buildings.

== History ==
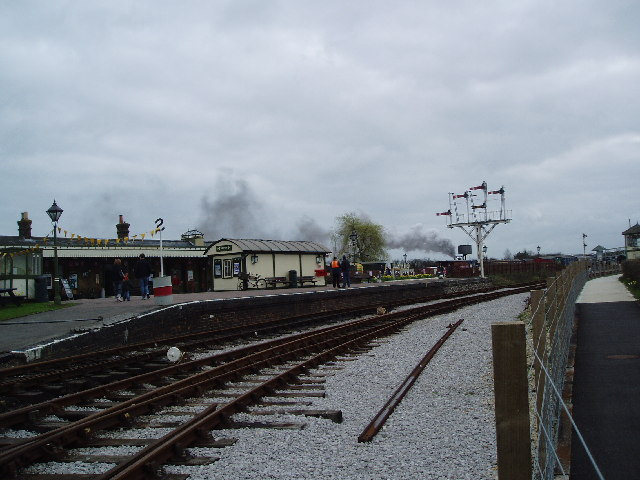
The curved Brill platform at Quainton Road. The short stretch of rail from this platform is the only surviving part of the Brill Tramway.

In 1962, the London Railway Preservation Society was formed. It bought a series of former London Underground vehicles and collectables, and holds the largest collection of London and North Western Railway memorabilia. These were held at various sites around London, mainly two government depots at Luton and Bishop's Stortford, making both access, restoration and preservation difficult.

While other closed stations on the former MR lines north of Aylesbury were generally demolished or sold, in 1969 the Quainton Railway Society was formed to operate a working museum at the station. On 24 April 1971 the society absorbed the London Railway Preservation Society, taking custody of its collection of historic railway equipment.

=== Restoration ===
The station was maintained in working order, used as a bookshop and ticket office. The extensive sidings were still intact, and although disconnected from the mainline in 1967, were used for locomotive restoration work. The Society eventually restored the main station building to its 1900 appearance, renaming the site the Buckinghamshire Railway Centre. A smaller building on the former Brill platform, once a shelter for passengers waiting for Brill and down trains, was used first as a store then as a shop for a number of years before its current use to house an exhibit on the history of the Brill Tramway. A former London Transport building from Wembley Park was dismantled and re-erected at Quainton Road to serve as a maintenance shed.

=== Mainline services ===
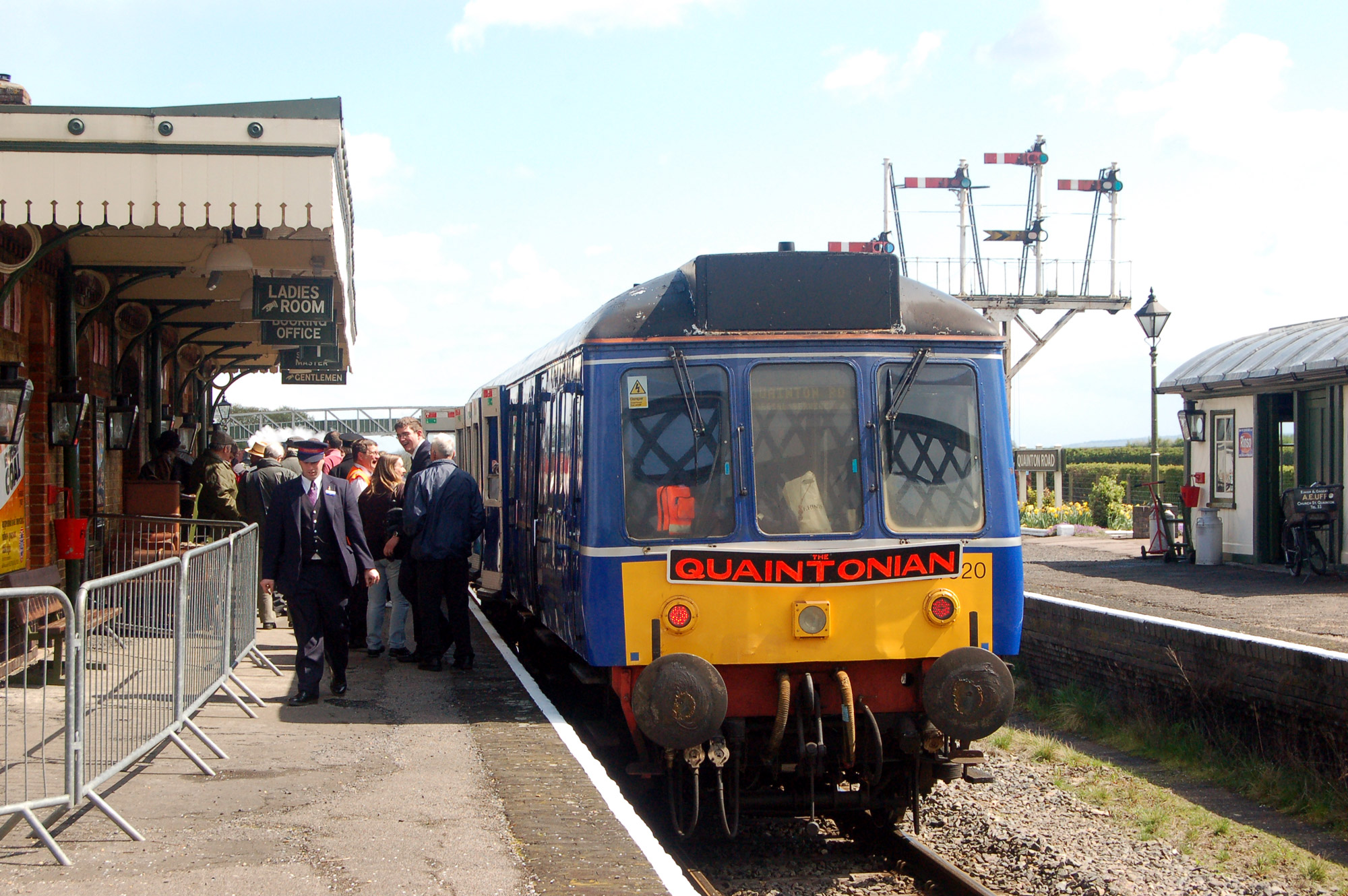
Chiltern Railways Class 121 'Bubble Car' diesel unit at Buckinghamshire Railway Centre on a shuttle service from Aylesbury on 3 May 2010

Although the BRC's trains are run on the former station sidings, the station still has a working Network Rail line passing through it. This connects Aylesbury with the Bletchley to Oxford cross-country route at Claydon (LNE) Junction. Regular landfill freight trains and High Speed 2 spoil trains traverse the line from waste transfer depots in Greater London as well as some from the freight terminal at Tytherington and other freight locations in the South-West of England to the former brick pits at Calvert. The High Speed 2 trains also terminate here, but are used for the construction of the new High Speed 2 depot at Calvert.

From 1984 until 1990, the station briefly came back into passenger use, when special Christmas shopping services between Aylesbury and Bletchley were operated by British Rail Network SouthEast on Saturdays only, and stopped at Quainton Road. From August Bank Holiday 1971 until the 1987 season, and again from August Bank Holiday 2001 until May 2017 the station has had special passenger trains from Aylesbury in connection with events at the Centre - these shuttles ran regularly each Spring and August Bank Holiday weekend.

== Present ==
With an extensively redeveloped site on both sides of the working mainline, BRC houses around 170 items of locomotives and rolling stock, in buildings dating from 1874 to the 1960s. The adjacent World War II warehouses of the Ministry of Food Buffer Depot in the former downside yard have been taken over to display many items awaiting restoration, whilst the Society have added a members' reference library.

=== Rewley Road ===
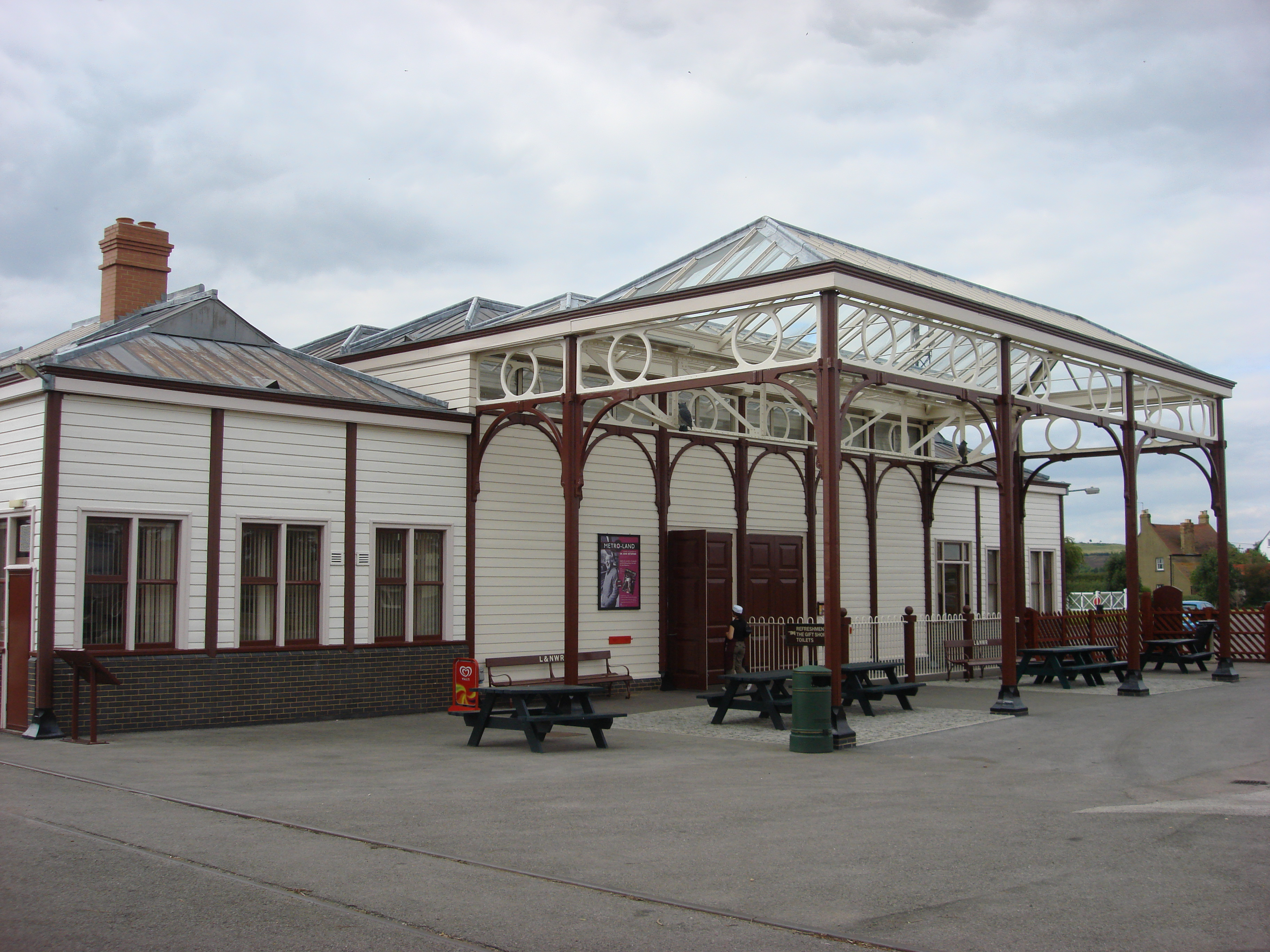
The former Oxford Rewley Road station building following its reconstruction at Quainton Road

Rewley Road, the Oxford terminus of Harry Verney's Buckinghamshire Railway and of the Oxford to Cambridge Line, closed to passengers on 1 October 1951 with trains diverted to the former GWR Oxford General, the current Oxford station. In co-operation with the Science Museum, Rewley Road was dismantled in 1999. The main station building and part of the platform canopy were then moved to BRC and re-erected in 2002 at the north-west corner of the site, now providing improved visitor facilities and the main offices of the QRS.

=== Media ===
As one of the best-preserved period railway stations in England, Quainton Road is regularly used as a filming location for programmes such as The Jewel in the Crown, the Doctor Who serial Black Orchid, Midsomer Murders and was a recurring location for the eighth series of Taskmaster.

== Future developments ==
High Speed 2's planned route passes immediately to the west of the site, not impacting the centre directly, although it will preclude any restoration of the Brill Tramway.

== Collection ==
The collection includes locomotives, carriages, and assorted rolling stock, plus a large amount of memorabilia and documents.

=== Locomotives ===
Sortable table
Class	Number (and name)	Chassis	Status	Notes	Image
Metropolitan Railway; E Class	No.1 (London Transport L44)	0-4-4T	Under overhaul	Built 1898. Withdrawn from service early needing boiler repairs.	
LSWR; 0298 Class	314 (British Railways 30585)	2-4-0WT	Static Display	Built 1874. Boiler ticket expired in 2016.	
Peckett and Sons	No.1159; Annie	0-4-0ST	Under overhaul	Built 1908. Arrived in April 2018 from the Embsay and Bolton Abbey Steam Railway. Part way through a major overhaul.	
Peckett and Sons	No.2105; Rokeby	0-4-0ST	Static Display	Built 1951. Mainly used on goods/vintage trains.	
North British Locomotive Company	Coventry; No.1	0-6-0T	Static Display	Built 1939. Previously acted as Thomas the Tank Engine on "Thomas" days. On static display after her boiler certificate expired.	
Hudswell Clarke	No.1742; Millom	0-4-0ST	Operational	Built 1946. Used on goods and vintage trains. Currently running in guise of Percy the Small Engine. Boiler ticket expires in 2027.	
Aveling and Porter	No.3587; Sydenham	0-4-0WTG	Under overhaul	Built 1895	
GWR 6959 Class	6984; Owsden Hall	4-6-0	Under restoration	Built 1948. Transferred from the Swindon and Cricklade Railway in November 2019. Its tender is currently in use behind 6989.	
GWR 6959 Class	6989; Wightwick Hall	4-6-0	Operational	Built 1948. Returned to service for the 2019 May Bank Holiday Gala. Restoration complete as of 11 December 2018. Using 6984 Owsden Hall's tender.	
GWR 7200 Class	7200	2-8-2T	Under restoration	Built in 1934	
Hunslet Austerity 0-6-0ST	No.3890; NCB 66	0-6-0ST	Operational	Last Hunslet Austerity built in 1964. Boiler ticket expires in 2024.	
Peckett and Sons	No.1900	0-4-0ST	Under overhaul	Built 1936. Britain's smallest standard-gauge steam locomotive.	
Andrew Barclay	No.699; Swanscombe	0-4-0ST	Under overhaul	Built 1891. The oldest surviving Barclay. Repainted in July 2013 into pseudo-Metropolitan Railway livery as Brill No. 1.	
Bagnall	No.2469; Scott	0-4-0ST	Static display	Built 1932. Boiler ticket expired in 2024. Mainly used on goods trains.	
Andrew Barclay	No.1477	0-4-0F	Static display	Built 1916. Fireless	
Andrew Barclay	No.2243	0-4-0F	Static display	Built 1948. Fireless	
Aveling and Porter	No.807; Brill	0-4-0TG	Static display	Built 1872. Brill Tramway No.1	
GWR 5700 Class	7715 (London Transport L99)	0-6-0PT	Static display	Built 1930. Bought by London Transport in 1963, their L.99 until 1969. Out of service from December 2011 with a cracked boiler foundation ring.	
Hawthorn Leslie	No.3717; Swanscombe No.3	0-4-0ST	Static display	Built 1928	
Hawthorn Leslie	No.3718; Swanscombe No.4	0-4-0ST	Operational	Built 1928. Arrived in 2018 near the end of a major overhaul. She entered service in August 2018. Boiler ticket expires 2028. Currently located at the Northampton and Lamport Railway.	
Hudswell Clarke	No.1334; Sir Thomas	0-6-0T	Static display	Built 1918	
Hunslet	No.3782; Arthur	0-6-0ST	Operational	Built 1953. Returned to service in 2024. Currently running in guise of Thomas the Tank Engine.	
LNWR	3020; Cornwall	2-2-2	Static Display	Built 1847. On display inside the Rewley Road visitor centre. On loan from the National Railway Museum.	
South African Class 25NC	3405	4-8-4	Static Display	Built 1953. 3 ft 6 in (1,067 mm) gauge	
Sentinel Waggon Works	No.6515; Isebrook	4wd	Operational	Built 1945. Returned to steam in 2019 after overhaul. Boiler ticket expires in 2029. Currently located at the Cholsey and Wallingford Railway.	
Yorkshire Engine Company	No.2498; Chislet	0-6-0ST	Static Display	Built 1951	
British Rail Class 04	D2298	0-6-0DM	Under Restoration	Built 1960. Under restoration after suffering an engine failure at the East Lancashire Railway.	
John Fowler	No.20067; Osram	0-4-0DM	Static Display		
F.C. Hibberd "Planet"	No.3765	0-4-0DM	Operational		
F.C. Hibberd	No.2102	0-4-0DM	Static Display		
F.C. Hibberd	No.3271; Walrus	0-4-0DM	Static Display		
Hunslet	K4428; Redland	0-4-0DM	Static Display		
Hunslet	No.2067	0-4-0DM	Operational		
Ruston & Hornsby	No.425477	0-4-0DM	Operational		
Ruston & Hornsby	No.463153; Hilsea	0-4-0DM	Operational	Ex-British Gas	

=== Diesel multiple units ===
- BR Class 115 unit 51886+59761+51889 "Aylesbury College Silver Jubilee 1987"

=== Electric multiple units ===
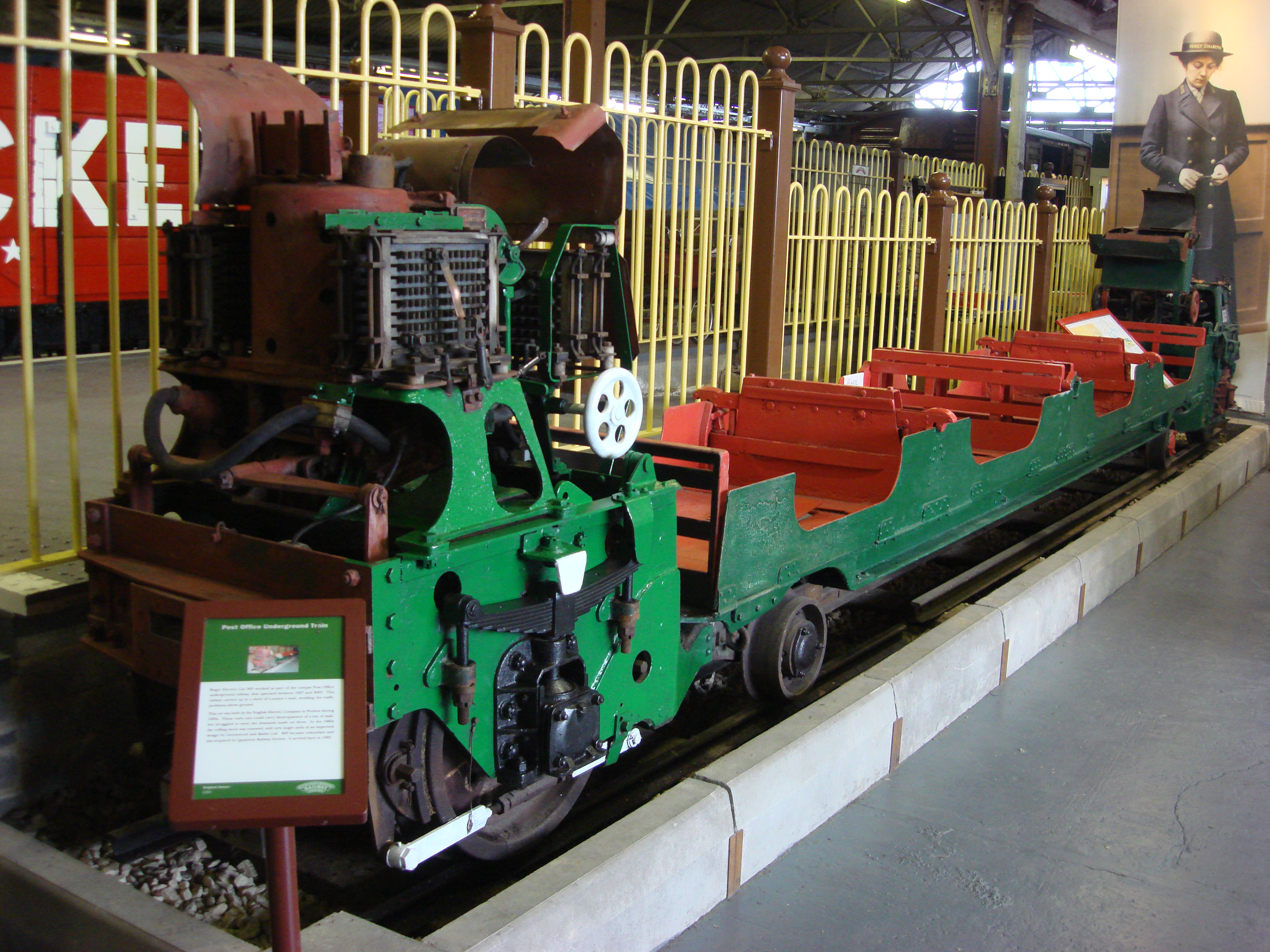
1930 Stock Car No. 803 at the Buckinghamshire Railway Centre

- Post Office Railway (London) 1930 Stock No. 803
- London Underground CO/CP Stock unit 53028+013063+54233
- New York City Subway car No. 1144, an R6, converted into a cafeteria for the museum.

=== Carriages and vans ===
- BR Mk 1 TPO sorting van no. 80394
- London Transport brake vans nos. B557 and FB578

== Carriages ==
=== Passenger coaching stock ===
Original company	Number	Type	Status/Notes	Image
LCDR	9	4-wheel first	Built 1880. Sold to Woolwich Arsenal in 1916. One of only two LCDR carriages to be preserved on their original underframe. Operational.	
WCJS	102	6-wheel sleeper, then inspection saloon.	LNWR design, converted to family saloon, later rebuilt as an inspection saloon in 1903. Body only. Stored on a GNoSR underframe.	
LNWR	112	12-wheel First class sleeper then cinema coach.	Built in 1907. Withdrawn in 1937 then rebuilt in 1952 to cinema coach at Liverpool Central, until 1972. Preserved 1973. Now plays Quainton Railway Society's story on weekends.	
LNWR	182	6-wheel picnic saloon.	Built in 1894. Later grounded, body is now on an ex-LMS underframe of the same length. Now restored and operational, although inside Quainton Road workshop as of 3 March 2019.	
LNWR	249	12-wheel first class diner	Built in 1901. Used for staff on royal train from 1905 to 1967, preserved that same year. Restored and operational.	
GNR	459	6-wheel third	Built in 1900. Now under restoration as of 3 March 2019.	
Great Central Railway	652	Suburban Brake Third	Built in 1916. Arrived at Quainton in 1997. Restoration started while on display inside museum, doors are inside the carriage with GCR numbering and lettering.	
MSJAR	1076	6-wheel third	Built by MSLR for MSJAR in 1890. Operational, restored as an open saloon.	
GNR	1470	6-wheel brake third	Built in 1889. Operational in GNR livery.	
GNR	1727	6-Wheel Passenger Brake Van	Built in 1897 at Doncaster. Withdrawn in 1938, became a fitters' van in February 1939, then a Pooley's van in 1960s. Went from Nene Valley Railway to Quainton in April, 2003.	
GWR	2242	Hawksworth Brake Corridor Third	Built in 1950 by Metro Cammell. Arrived at Quainton in January 1983 for 9466 Group. Being used for overnight volunteer accommodation.	
BR	5324	Mk2 Tourist Second Open	Built in 1968 at Derby. Preserved as a body only in 1988, grounded as a QRSL office for some time; now 6989 Wightwick Hall sales coach.	
GWR	9001	12-Wheel Collett Special Saloon	Built in 1940 at Swindon. Used by Winston Churchill and Dwight Eisenhower during WWII. Went to GWR preservation sites (Tyseley and SVR) before arriving at Quainton Road in January 2002.	
BR	16235	Mk1 Corridor Composite	Built in 1963 at Derby. Preserved August 1992. Now on replacement B1 bogies. Operational.	
LNER	22219	Suburban Third	Built in 1926. Only one of specific coach type left. Arrived at Quainton in 1983.	
BR	24993	Mk1 Corridor Second	Built in 1956. Operational, recently repainted from BR Maroon to BR Crimson and Cream.	
BR	25500	Mk1 Corridor Second	Built at York in 1958. Preserved in 1983. One bogie currently missing and that end of the coach is held up.	
BR	35192	Mk1 Brake Corridor Second	Built in 1958. Operational. Painted in BR Crimson and Cream	
BR	53190	Mk1 Suburban brake second	Built in 1954 at Doncaster. Preserved in 1977, at the Watercress Line till 1985. Operational.	

=== Non-passenger coaching stock ===
Original company	Number	Type	Status/Notes	Image
LNWR	None, later DM279982	6-wheel full brake.	Built in 1891. Lasted as C&W department stores van, later abandoned at Wolverton, of which its existence was not known by BR when alerted by a QRS member, later preserved (according to Buckinghamshire Railway Centre stockbook of 1990).	
SR	1108	4-wheel PMV	Built in 1936 at Ashford Works. Preserved in 1973 by 6024 Preservation Society. Recently underwent a repaint.	
LSWR	5025	4-Wheel Luggage Van	Built in 1917 at Eastleigh. Withdrawn in 1940. Preserved in 1971, then sold to Quainton in 1983. Now restored and operational.	
LNWR	11388	6-wheel Covered Carriage Truck	Built in 1911 at Wolverton. 1 of 2 survivors. Later used as a cell truck.	
BR	86450	General Utility Van	Built in 1954 by Pressed Steel. Arrived at Quainton in January 1994. Was used as an exhibition and stores vehicle, painted in BR Maroon.	
BR	94578	4-wheel Covered Carriage Trust	Built at Earlestown in 1960. Withdrawn in 1983, was to be scrapped but went to Quainton in October 1984.	
BR	96403	4-wheel Horse Box	Built in 1957 at Earlestown. Used for horses of Household Cavalry at Kensington Olympia and at Prince of Wales' Investiture at Caernarvon June 1969, preserved in 1972. Is an open display in the carriage shed.	

== Wagons ==
=== Cranes ===
Original company	Number	Type	Status/Notes	Image
M&GCJR	1	4-wheel Hand Crane	Built in 1914. Only M&GCJR-owned rail vehicle. Being restored. The original match wagon is not usable right now, so an LMS wagon underframe is in its place.	
LMS	No. ADM 27	10-ton hand-operated crane	Built in 1944 by Cowans Sheldon Ltd. Withdrawn in October 1982. New match wagon underframe created from a hopper wagon.	
