= Crane (rail) =

Type of crane used on a railroad

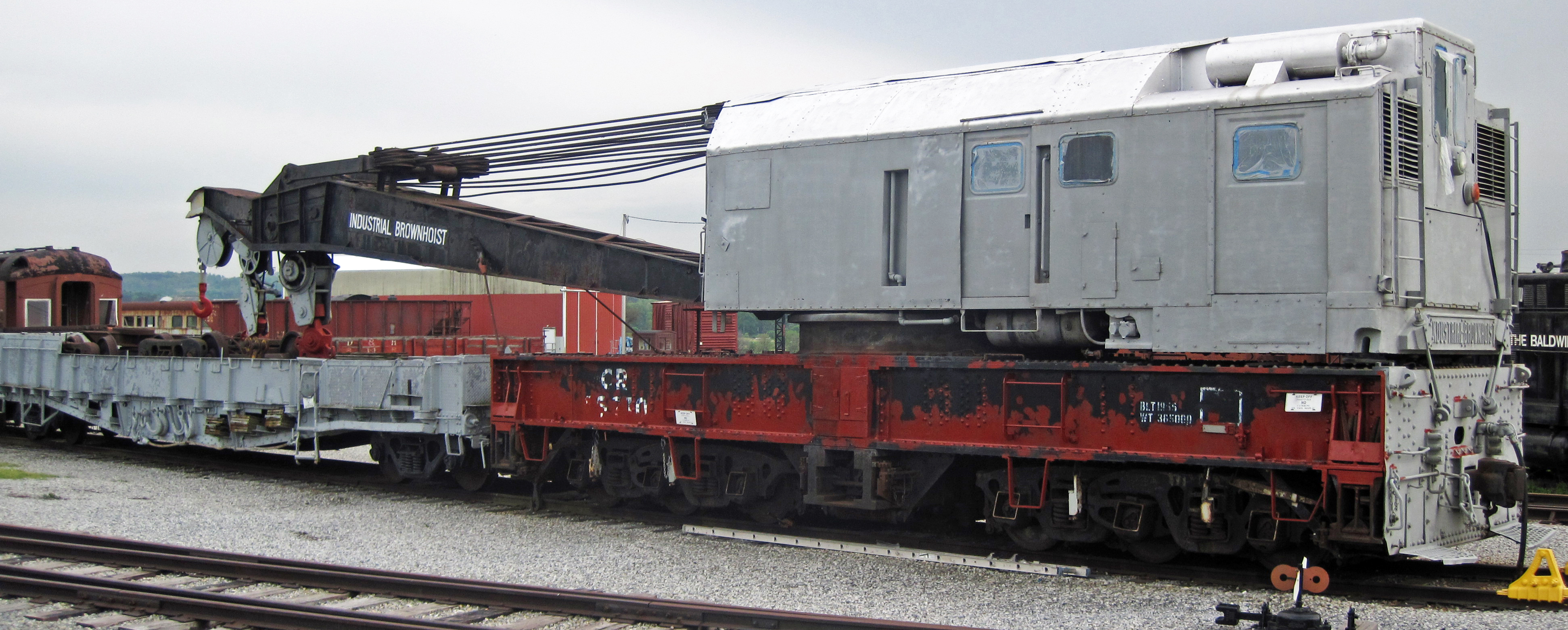
Rail Crane

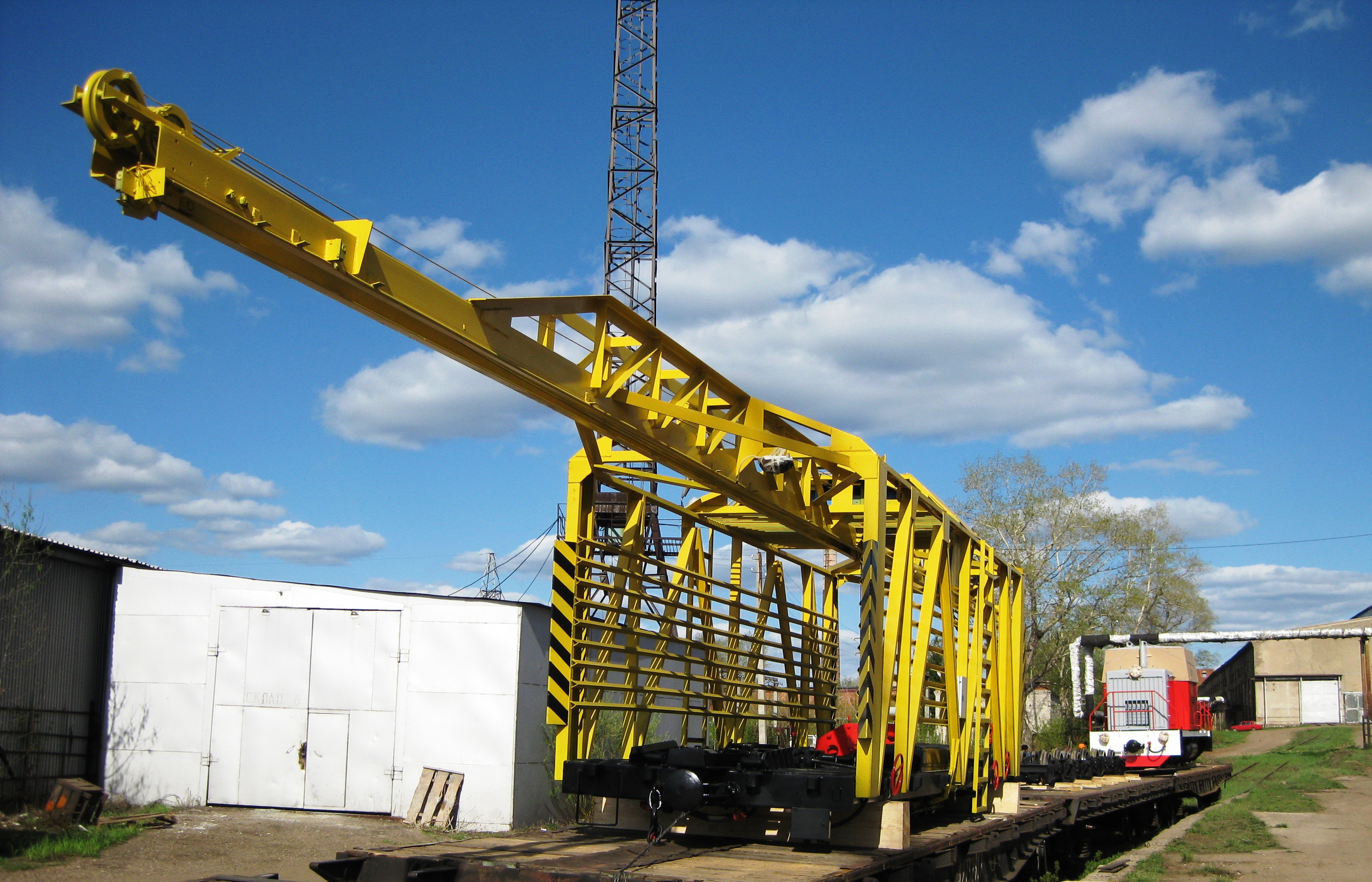
Rail SPA Crane (750 mm)

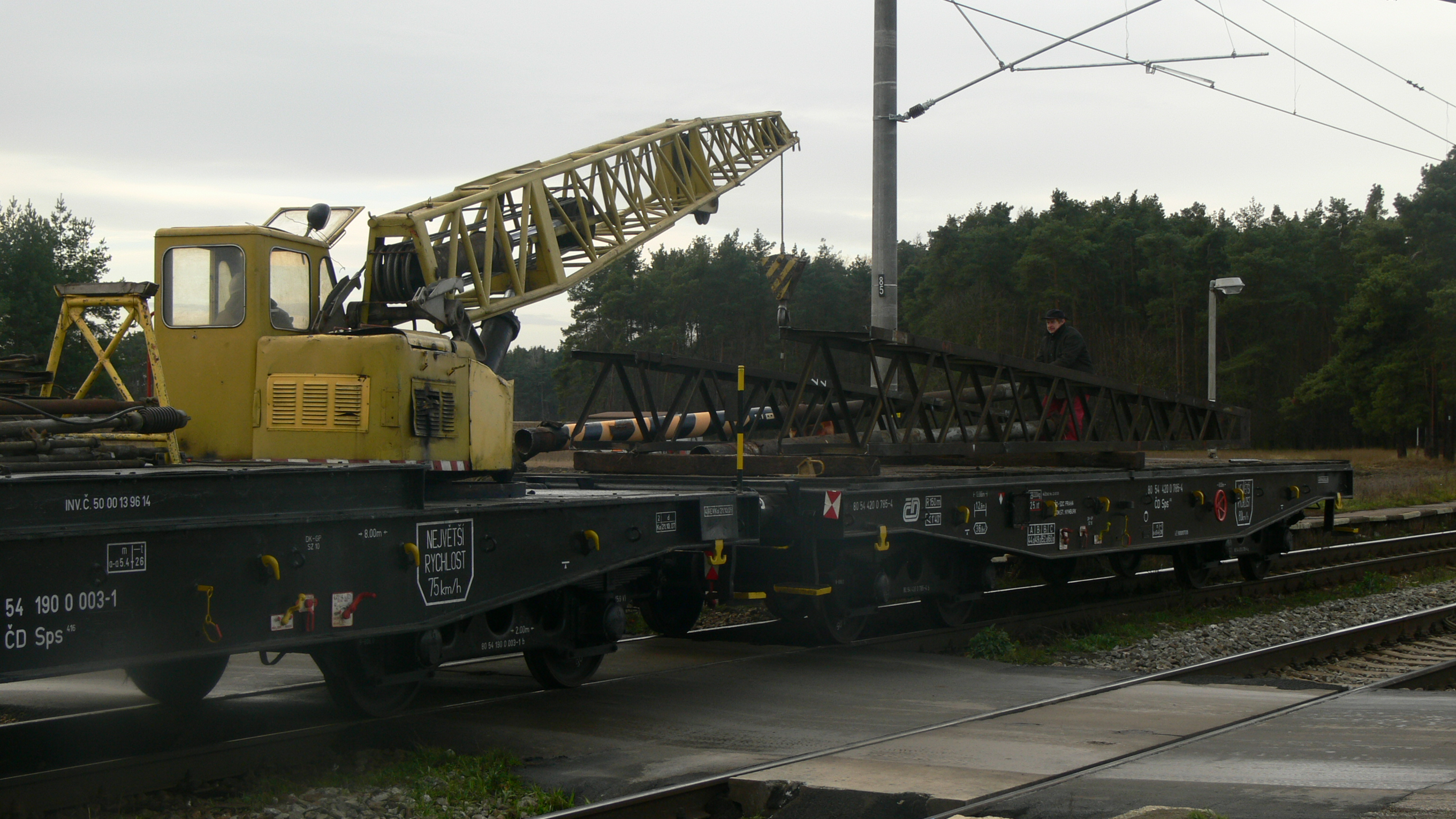
Czech PW maintenance crane

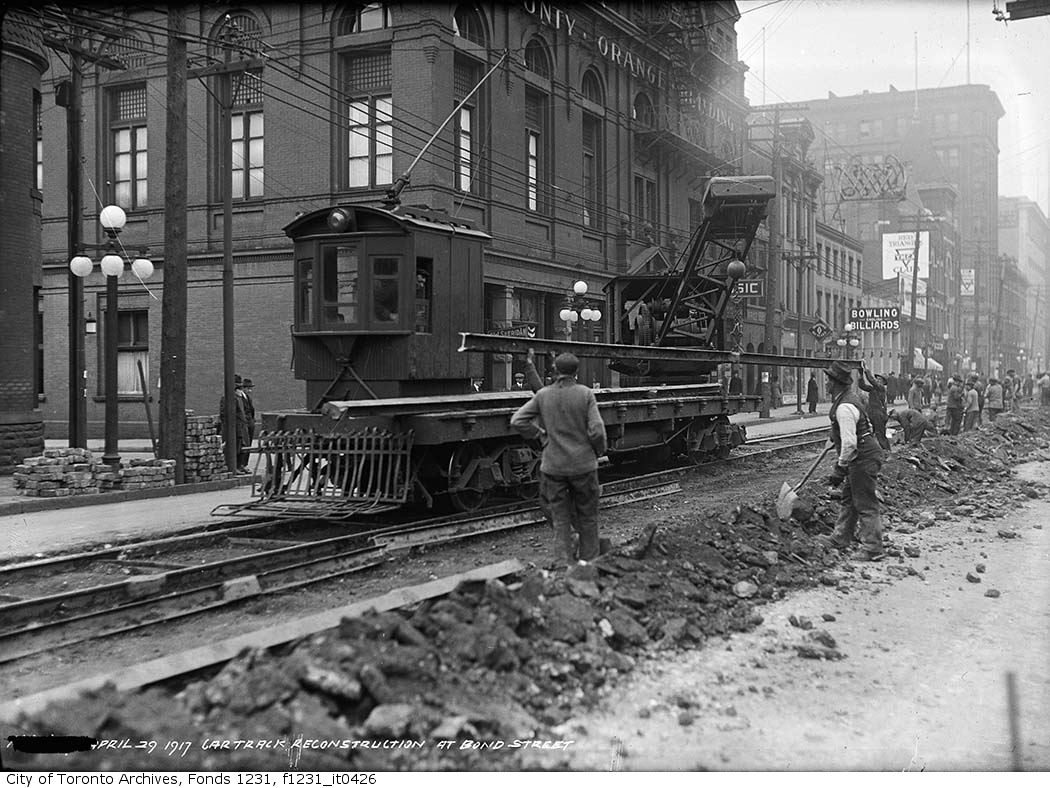
Electric crane replacing track on the Toronto streetcar system (1917)

A railway crane (North America: railroad crane, crane car or wrecker; UK: breakdown crane) is a type of crane used on a railway for one of three primary purposes: freight handling in goods yards, permanent way (PW) maintenance, and accident recovery work. Although the design differs according to the type of work, the basic configuration is similar in all cases: a rotating crane body is mounted on a sturdy chassis fitted with flanged wheels. The body supports the jib (UK; North America: boom) and provides all the lifting and operating mechanisms; on larger cranes, an operator's cabin is usually provided. The chassis is fitted with buffing (UK) and/or coupling gear to allow the crane to be moved by a locomotive, although many are also self-propelled to allow limited movement about a work site.

For cranes with a jib that extends beyond the length of the chassis, an idler car (also known as a 'jib carrier' (UK) or 'boom car' (North America)) is provided to protect the jib and to allow the crane to be coupled within a train. The idler car is usually a long, flat wagon (i.e. a flatcar) that provides a means of securing the jib for transportation; storage areas for special equipment or supplies are usually fitted too. It was not uncommon for the idler car to be built on a withdrawn revenue-earning wagon, such as on the Great Western Railway after the Grouping and in the 1930s (where they were referred to as 'match trucks').

== Usage ==
Railroad cranes are usually designed specifically for one of three purposes:

=== Goods yard cranes ===
Usually the smallest of the railroad cranes, goods yard cranes were used in the larger goods yards to provide lifting capability in areas away from the ground-mounted goods cranes normally provided in such yards.

They were often small enough to be operated by hand, and were not normally self-propelled, instead requiring the use of a shunting engine to move them into position. Once cheap road-going mobile cranes were available, these superseded the rail-mounted variety due to their greater flexibility and mobility.

=== Maintenance cranes ===
The most varied forms of crane are used for maintenance work. General purpose cranes may be used for installing signalling equipment or pointwork, for example, while more specialised types are used for track laying.

=== Breakdown cranes ===
The largest cranes are used for accident recovery work, usually forming part of a breakdown train that includes staff accommodation and recovery equipment. These are large enough to lift derailed rolling stock back onto the track, although two or more cranes may be required to safely recover a locomotive. In North American terminology, a 'breakdown crane' is often referred to as a 'wrecker' and the train of which it is a part is referred to as a 'wreck train'. The members of the crew that recovers the wrecked car(s) or locomotive(s) are referred to as 'wreckers'.

== Construction ==
A railroad crane generally resembles a conventional fixed-location crane except that the platform the crane sits on is a heavy-duty reinforced flat car. Directly underneath the center of gravity for the crane is a pivot point that allows the crane to swivel around 360°; in this way the crane can locate its boom over the worksite no matter what its location is along the track. The trucks on the car under the crane will often include traction motors so that the crane is able to move itself along the track, and possibly tow additional cars.

Larger cranes may be provided with outriggers to provide additional stability when lifting. Sleepers (ties) are often carried on the idler car to put under the outriggers to spread the weight applied to the trackbed.

Breakdown cranes (sometimes called wrecking cranes or 'big hooks') were necessary to every railroad to recover derailed rolling stock and locomotives, while also assisting with bridge building and yard construction.

== History ==
In the early days of the railways, locomotives and rolling stock were small enough to be re-railed manually using jacks and tackle, but as they became bigger and heavier this method became inadequate.

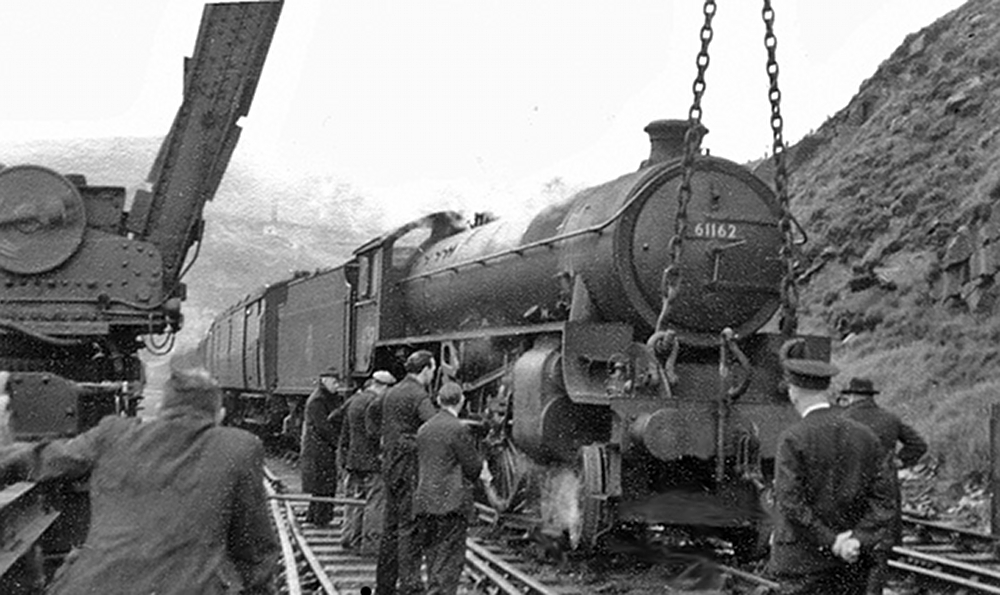
A breakdown crane lifting a derailed LNER Thompson Class B1 steam locomotive back onto the tracks on the Great Central Main Line, 1951

Enter into this the steam crane and cable winch. Appearing about 1890, the cranes (the proper rail terminology is “Derrick”) increased in size, commensurate with the rise of steel Pullman cars, so by 1910 steam cranes reached their peak of development (on the railroad). Many of these 1910-era cranes were so useful and powerful, that they remained in service until the 1980s. The combination of a quick-firing steam boiler, heavy steam winch, and cable hook could little be improved upon, and thus remained in service. Also, steam engines did not mind being parked for months, with a little care, and were ready to go to work when needed.

In the 1980s, big, hydraulic controlled diesel cranes appeared. Also, these cranes had the ability to travel on the highway so as to better able to get to the scene of an accident. They are much more mobile, and are able to manoeuvre around an accident scene, better than a crane only limited to rail access. In the United States the advent of contractors to cleanup and re-rail a line to productive status came in around the late 1970s and early 1980s. The use of caterpillar tractor mounted sidebooms (pipelayers) enabled the contractors to mobilize around a site without having the need for crane mats and multiple lifting locations.

In the 1990s a new generation of railway cranes was developed. While the conventional diesel hydraulic road cranes were adopted with some small trolleys to move on the rail track, the new generation had a professional high speed railway chassis for up to 120 kilometres per hour (75 mph). The superstructure is also diesel hydraulic with telescopic boom and counterweight and designed to the railway's specific needs. These cranes can travel with suspended loads and keep levelled even on an elevated track, due to the automatic cant compensation. It is possible to work on one outrigger only, work with boom in horizontal position under bridges or under the overhead wires. Capacities are as high as 200 tonnes. It makes this new generation useful for maintenance work and switch and crossing renewal, as well as recovery work.

== Manufacturers ==
=== Germany ===
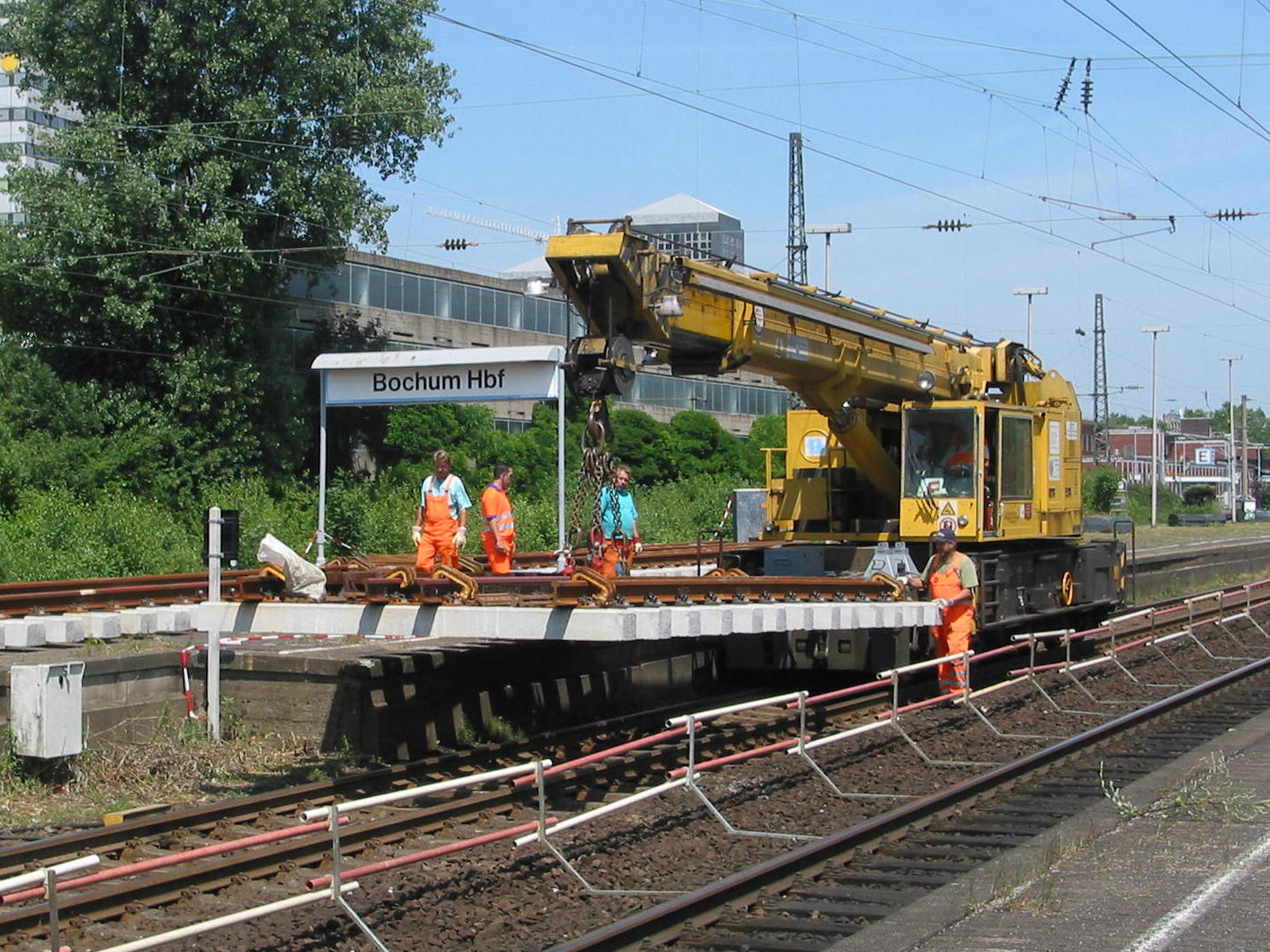
Schienenkran von Gottwald

- Deutsche Maschinenbau-Aktiengesellschaft
- Kirow Ardelt GmbH
- Krupp Ardelt
- Leo Gottwald KG

=== Great Britain ===
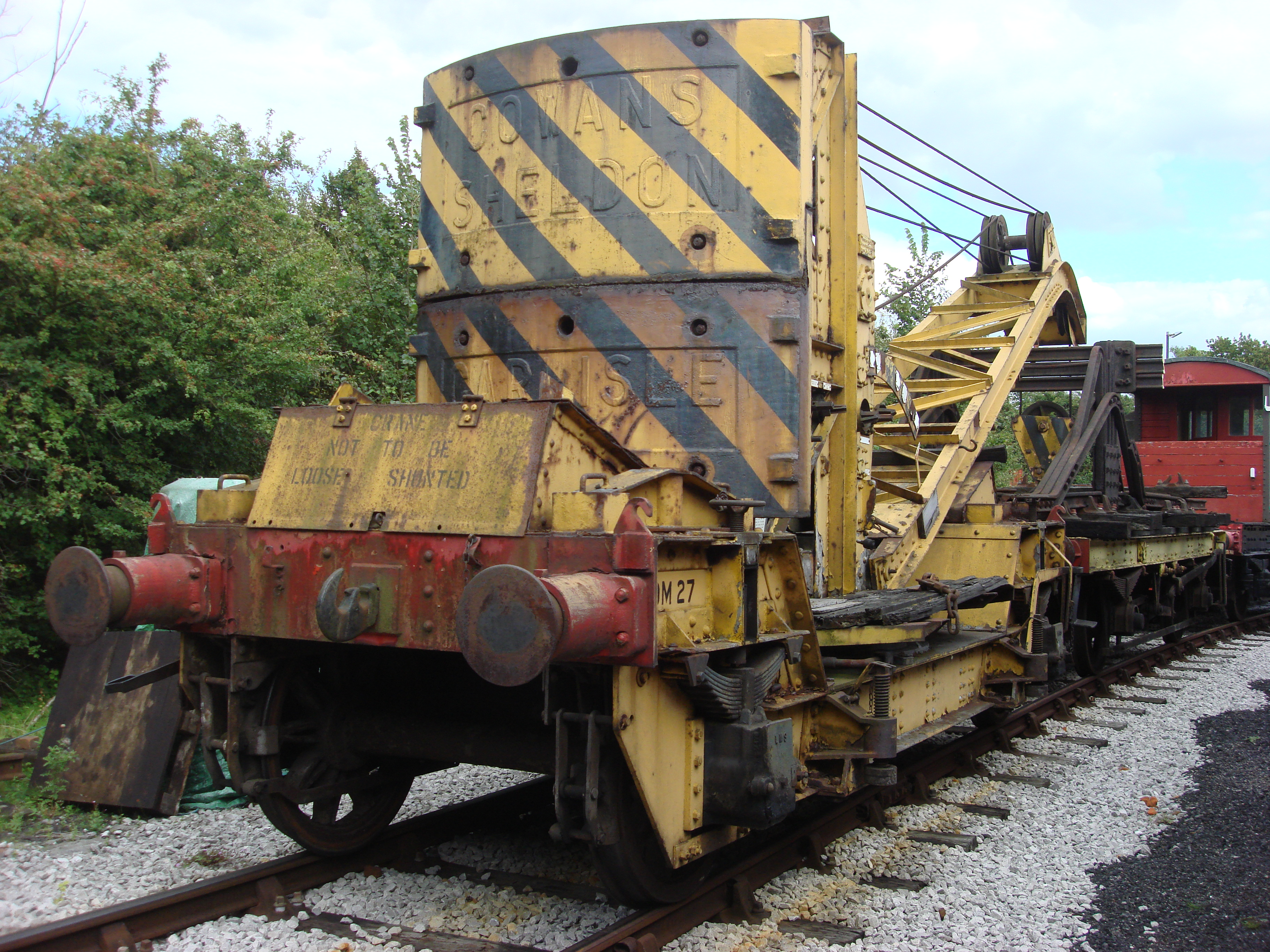
An LMS 10-ton Hand Crane made by Cowans Sheldon

- Cowans, Sheldon & Company, Carlisle – cranes are labelled Cowans Sheldon
- Ransomes & Rapier
- Thomas Smith & Sons (Rodley) Ltd – cranes are labelled Smith Rodley (not "Smith & Rodley")
- Taylor & Hubbard Ltd, Leicester
- Appleby Brothers
- Craven Brothers Ltd.
- Stothert & Pitt

=== United States ===
- American Hoist and Derrick
- Arva Industries
- Badger Equipment Company
- Bucyrus
- Industrial Brownhoist
- Link-Belt
- Lima
- Little Giant Corporation
- Marion
- Ohio Railroad Crane
- Swingmaster Corporation
- Cullen Friestedt Co (Burro), numerous successor companies later owned Burro

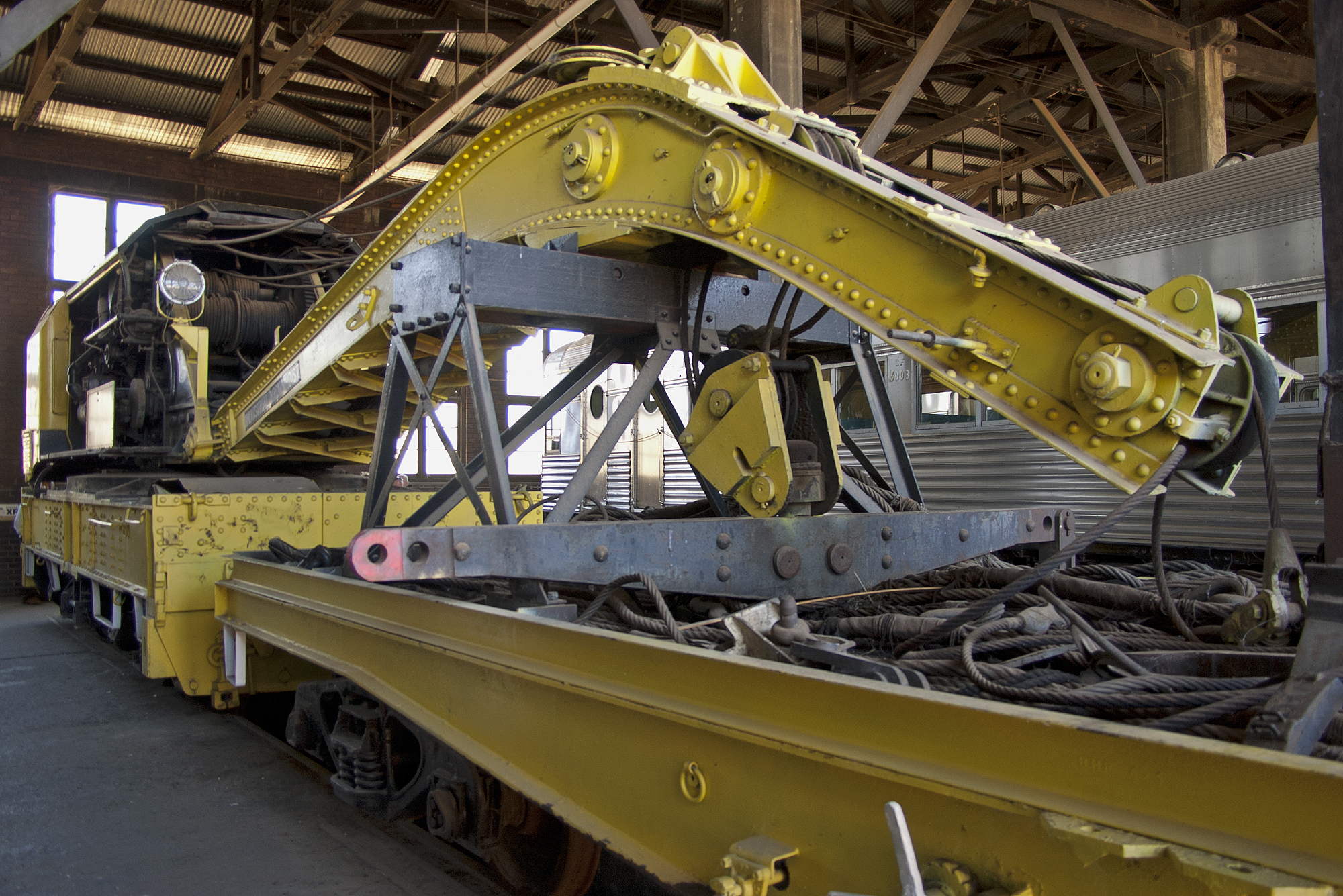
Industrial Brownhoist X1080 50 ton steam driven wrecking crane

=== Russia ===
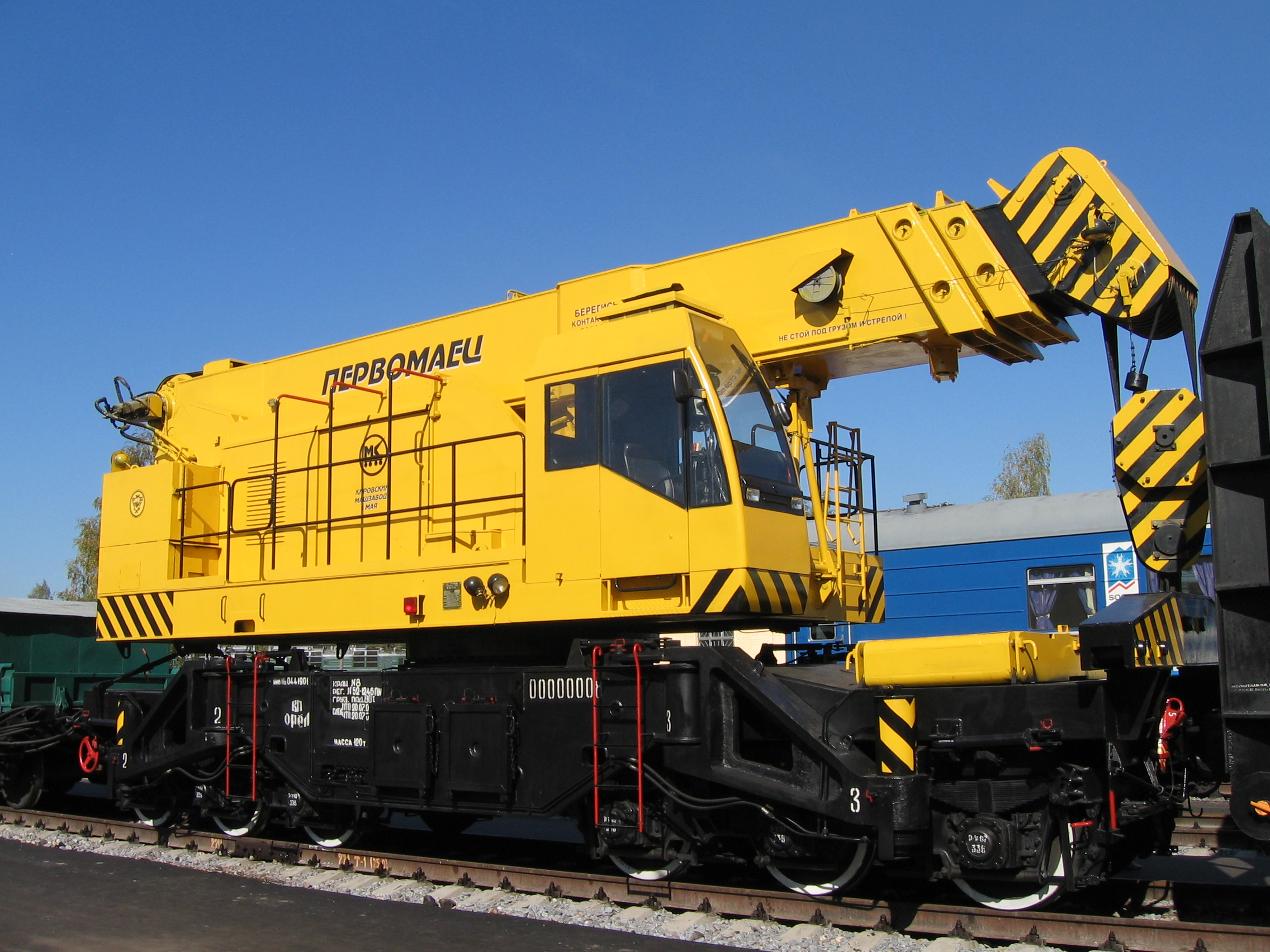
КЖ-971 Kirov Machine-Building Plant

- Kambarka Engineering Works
- JSC "Kirovsky mashzavod 1 Maya"

== Preservation ==
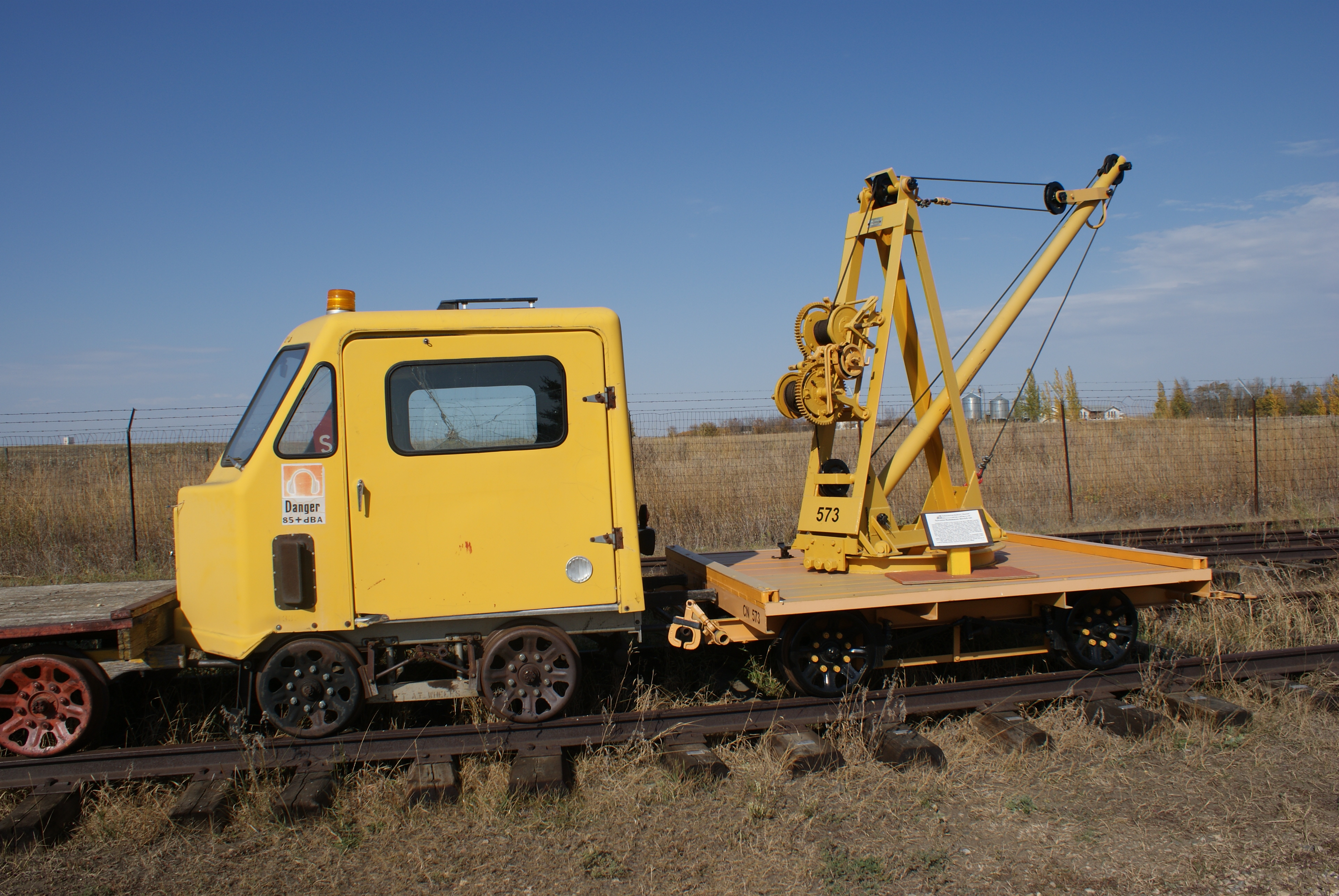
Canadian National Railways derrick car (Sylvester Manufacturing Company, Kalamazoo Railway Supply Company) a crane mounted on a push car, pulled with a speeder or draisine

Most heritage railways in the UK have one or more preserved railway cranes, either just as historic exhibits, or as fully functioning examples assisting with the operation of the railway. Although not normally required for re-railing activities, they are exceptionally useful for track relaying and the restoration of locomotives and rolling stock, and help to avoid expenditure on outside contractors.

Three cranes of various sizes are preserved at the Western Pacific Railroad Museum at Portola, California. They are all cranes once owned by the Western Pacific Railroad and two of them, a small, self-propelled Burro Crane and a large, 200-ton capacity Industrial Brownhoist crane, are maintained in operable condition.

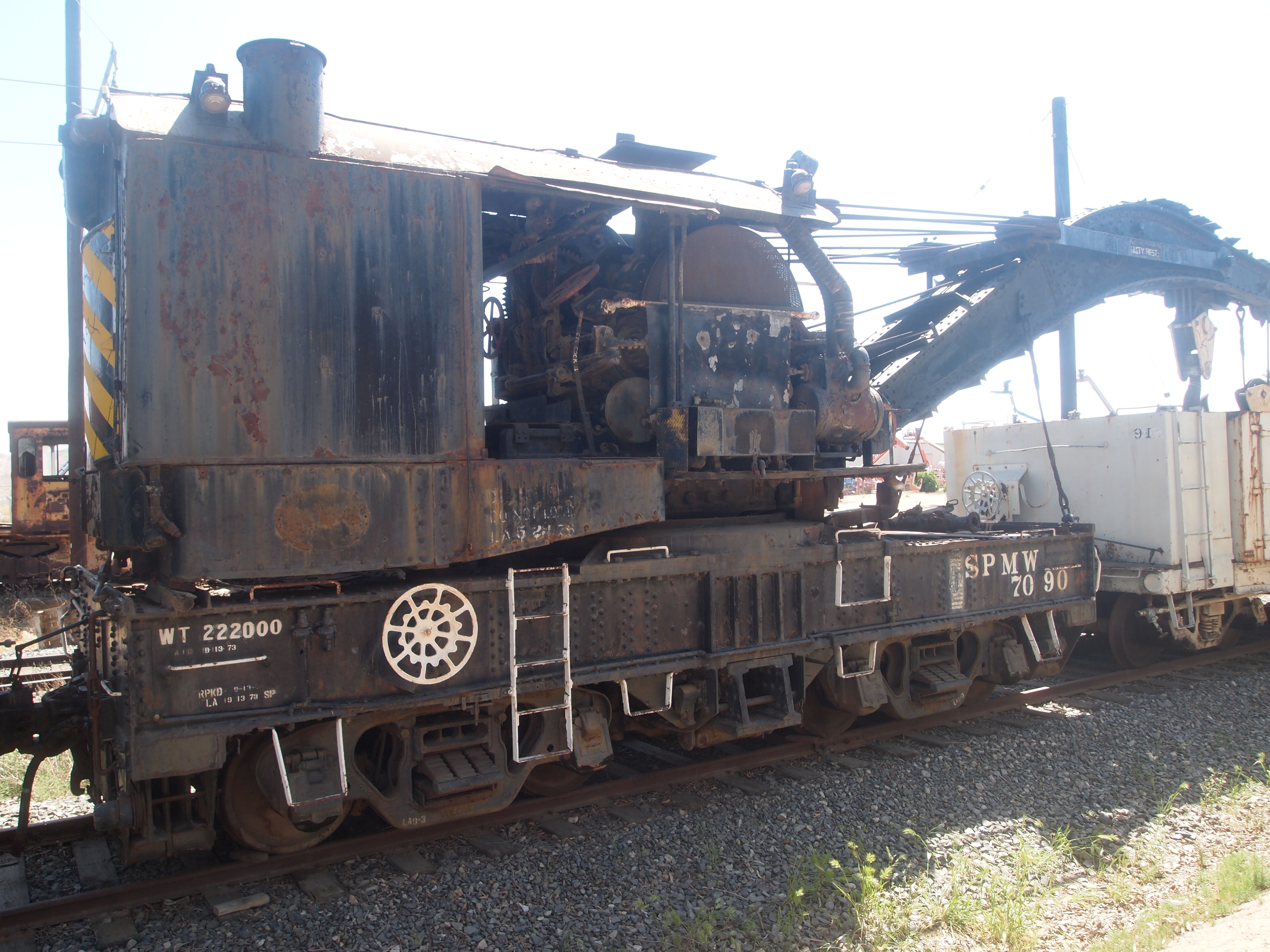
This Southern Pacific steam wrecker is in the collection of the Southern California Railway Museum. The museum also has an Atchison, Topeka & Santa Fe Ry. wrecker, as well as an ATSF burro crane.

All Japanese railway cranes had already retired. Road cranes are used for re-railing and maintenance works. Type "so-30" railway crane for accident recovery is preserved at Otaru synthesis museum. Type "so-80" railway crane for accident recovery is preserved at Sakuma railpark. Type "so-300" railway crane for bridge construction is preserved at Usuitouge tetsudo bunkamura.

Several breakdown cranes are preserved in the various Australian states. Examples preserved in New South Wales as X10 Class and include 1048 a 30T steam crane built by Cowans Sheldon, preserved at Rothbury. 1050 a 50T steam crane built by Craven Bros, preserved at Dorrigo. 1055 a 35T steam crane converted to diesel built by Ransome & Rapier, preserved at Canberra. 1060 a 120T steam crane converted to diesel built by Krupp Ardelt, preserved at Dorrigo. 1073 a 70T steam crane built by Craven Bros converted to diesel, preserved Richmond Main. 1080 a 50T steam crane built by Industrial Brownhoist, preserved Junee. 1081 a 50T steam crane built by Industrial Brownhoist, preserved Dorrigo.

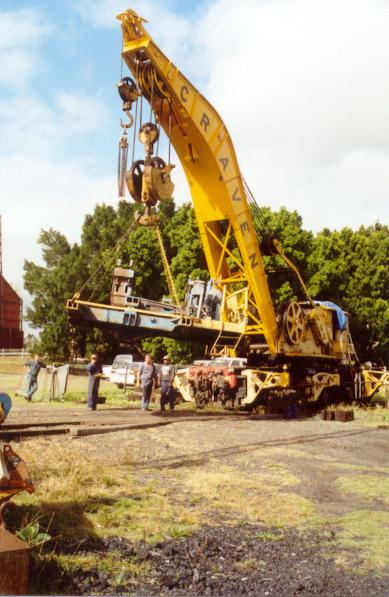
ex NSWGR 70Ton Craven breakdown crane 1073 unloading an end platform of an ex BHP Newcastle Steelworks Treadwell hot metal car in 2000

== See also ==
- Crane (machine)
- Crane tank locomotive
- Idler flatcars
- Rescue tactics
