= Thomas Smith & Sons =

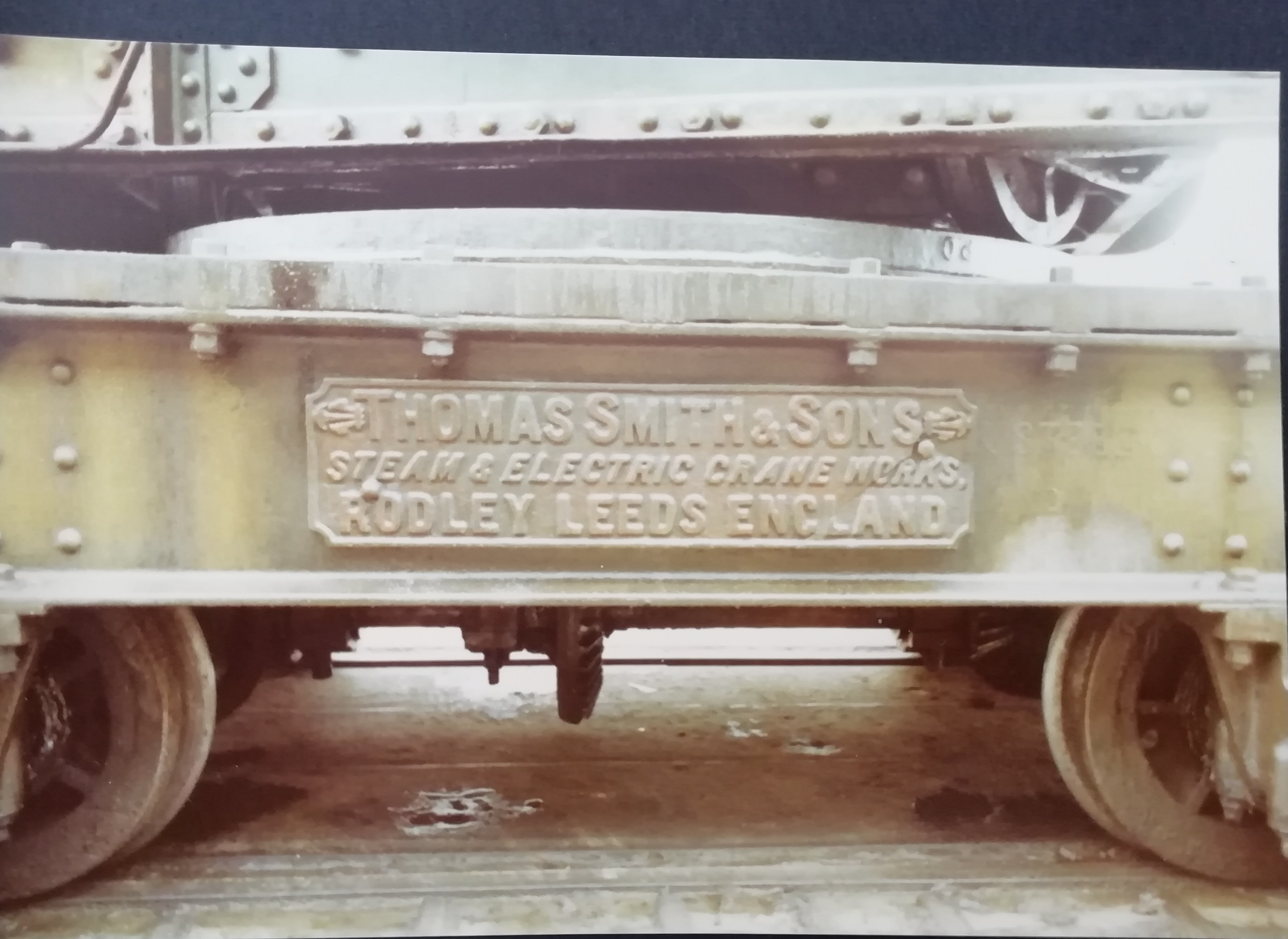
Steam crane (bogie) by Smith & Sons, in Puno, Peru, on Lake Titicaca

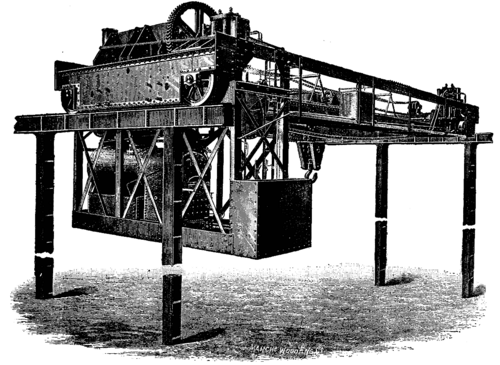
An illustration from an article in Scientific American magazine from 1891 describing a steam-powered bridge crane manufactured by Thomas Smith of Rodley, West Yorkshire.

Thomas Smith & Sons was a British engineering company that played a key role in manufacturing cranes, starting with hand-operated models in the 1840s and advancing to steam-powered cranes by the 1860s. Founded by Thomas Smith, the company became known for producing highly reliable cranes for docks, railway yards, and large construction projects both in the UK and internationally. In the late 19th century, they began producing electric cranes and later expanded to create cranes powered by internal combustion engines. These cranes were used in major projects like the Aswan Low Dam and the Manchester Ship Canal.

The company’s success continued throughout the 20th century until it was acquired by Thomas Ward and eventually merged into the Northern Engineering Industries group in 1978. This was part of a broader consolidation within the crane and heavy machinery industry, with other companies like Joseph Booth also joining the larger group. Despite various mergers, the legacy of Thomas Smith & Sons lives on through its influence on modern crane engineering and its contributions to the industrial infrastructure of the UK.

== Early history ==
The history of the firm goes back to 1820 and a firm established by Thomas Smith's father David Smith in partnership with Jeremiah Balmforth and based in the nearby area of Calverley. Like several companies operating around Leeds at the time, their business was supplying the machinery that would be used in the increasingly mechanised mills of the time. From 1840 hand-operated cranes were added to their range of products, and these would start a line of business that would be lucrative for all the partners and their descendants for many years. The company were joined by Jeremiah Booth in 1833; he left in 1847 and established his own 'Union Foundry' on Town Street, Rodley. That company also went on to produce large numbers of cranes and was passed on to Jeremiah Booth's son Joseph Booth. In 1855, the name Joseph Booth & Bros was adopted.

In the 1850s the original partnership was also passed on to the next generation. Jeremiah Balmforth died in 1858 and his son William Balmforth replaced him; the following year David Smith was succeeded by his son Thomas. Around 1860 they started to produce steam-powered cranes capable of handling much larger loads. In 1861 there was a falling-out between Balmforth and Smith; Thomas Smith bought out the company and took over its running. William Balmforth set up a new firm the 'Peel Ings Foundry' and remained in the crane-manufacturing business. As well as steam cranes, they also produced a small number of vertical-boilered locomotives. The Peel Ings Foundry didn't enjoy the same kind of success as the works of Thomas Smith and Joseph Booth, though. It went bankrupt in 1916 and was bought by bridge maker Samuel Butler & Co, but they closed down the works and began production of steam cranes for a time in their own works.

Thomas Smith brought his sons into his firm, and they took over when he died in 1902. The company were incorporated as Thomas Smith & Sons in 1918.

== Products ==
One of the company's most popular products was fairly small steam-powered cranes. Based on a tall central pivot and with the jib counterbalanced by the boiler, these are commonly known as 'Leeds Type' cranes; they were either rail-mounted, where they were required to move around a site, or ground-mounted, for the likes of quays. Joseph Booth also produced very similar cranes, and, with high demand at the time, there were a few firms nearby that, though specialising in other products such as bridges and structural metal work, produced relatively small numbers of steam cranes. John Butler & Co, Samual Butler & Co (mentioned earlier), Isles and Whitaker Brothers are other local firms to have been involved in steam crane production.

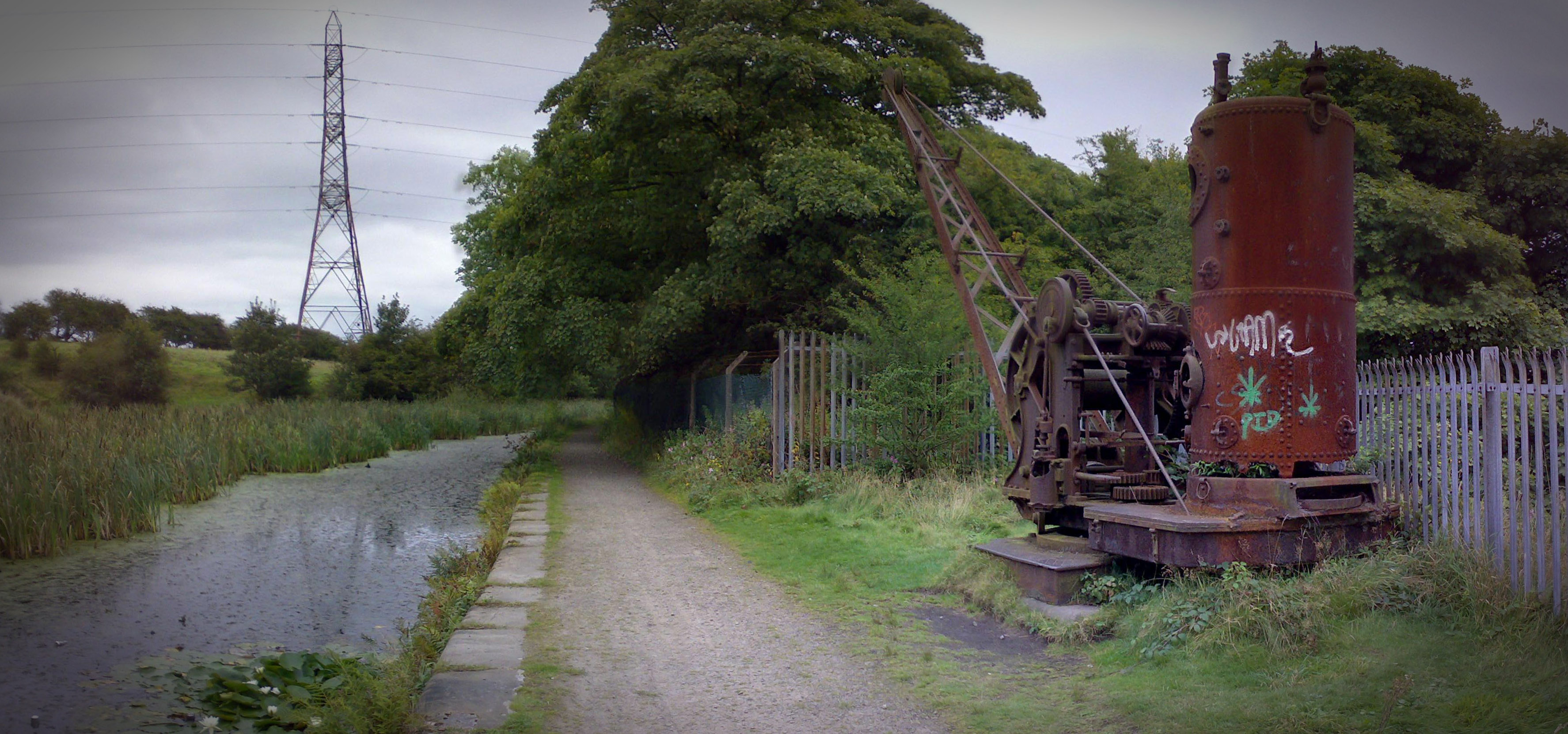
Derelict Smith (Rodley) crane, on the Manchester Bolton & Bury Canal

The cranes were used in countless docks, railway yards, quarries and construction sites, both at home and overseas. Some of the largest construction projects to use Smith cranes were the Manchester Ship Canal, the Aswan Low Dam, and the Sudan Barrage. As early as 1897 Thomas Smith were producing electrically powered cranes, and in later years the internal combustion engine would replace the steam engine as the power source in their cranes. The cranes were adapted to become excavators, with buckets replacing the usual crane hook; the company also provided magnets for use in sites handling metals. Caterpillar track-fitted versions were offered, and these became more numerous in later years as the railway industry lost its dominance.

== Mergers ==
The company was taken over by Thomas Ward shortly before World War II. In 1978 they were taken over by Northern Engineering Industries. NEI had taken over many big manufacturing companies, which already included Cowans Sheldon, Clyde Crane, Wellman Cranes and Smith's next-door neighbours Joseph Booth. They all became part of the Crane and Bridge division of Clarke Chapman. This was taken over by Rolls-Royce plc in 1989 and by Langley Holdings in 2001.

== Today ==
The Clarke Chapman group still operate in Leeds but under the Wellman Booth name, though they are now situated in smaller premises at Yeadon where the design and administration work is carried out, the engineering work taking place in Gateshead. Though Booth's works was demolished and redeveloped with housing, the former Thomas Smith works survives in other industrial use.
