= London Underground A Stock =

London Underground A Stock may refer to:

- London Underground A Stock (District Railway)
- London Underground A60 and A62 Stock
