= A Stock =

A Stock may refer to:

- London Underground A Stock (District Railway), London Underground rolling stock built in 1903
- London Underground A60 and A62 Stock, a class of sub-surface train run on the London Underground, built in 1960
- MTR A-Stock EMU, rolling stock built for MTR's Tung Chung Line and Airport Express
- Alec Stock (1917-2001), English footballer
- Class A share, a kind of common stock
