= Nankai 22000 series =

Japanese train type

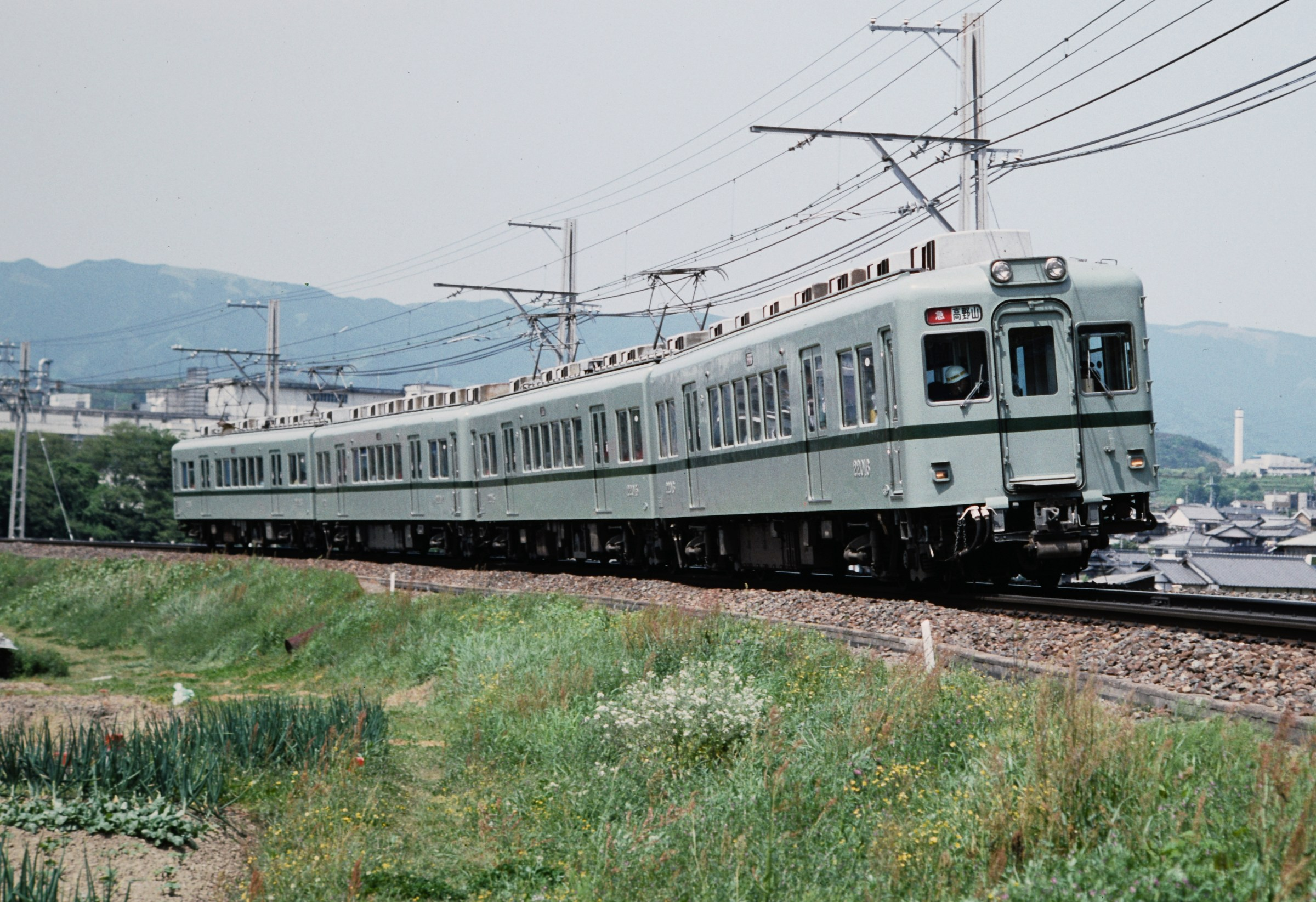
- Two 22000 series sets on a Koya Line express service in May 1992
- In service: 1969–present
- Family name: Zoom Car
- Entered service: 1969
- Scrapped: 1997–1998 (22000 series)
- Number in service: 2 vehicles (1 set) (as 2200 series)
- Formation: 2 cars per trainset
- Operators: Nankai Electric Railway
- Lines served: Kōya Line; Takashinohama Line; Tanagawa Line

Specifications
- Car body construction: Steel
- Doors: 2 per side
- Maximum speed: 100 km/h (62 mph)
- Electric system(s): 600 V DC / 1,500 V DC overhead line
- Current collection: Pantograph
- Bogies: FS17A
- Multiple working: 2000 series; 2300 series
- Track gauge: 1,067 mm (3 ft 6 in)

The Nankai 22000 series (南海22000系, Nankai 22000-kei) is an electric multiple unit (EMU) train type that was introduced by the private railway operator Nankai Electric Railway in Japan in 1969.

== Overview ==
The 22000 series trains have a similar design to the 7100 series, however, the cars are around 17 metres long and were built with two double doors per side. In preparation for the increase in the voltage of the Koya Line in 1973, the sets were built to be compatible with both 600 V and 1,500 V DC electrification.

The fleet progressively entered service from 1969 to increase passenger capacity on the Koya Line.

== Operations ==
The converted 2200 series sets were mainly used on the Shiomibashi Line, Takashinohama Line, and Tanagawa Line.

== 2200/2230/2270 series ==
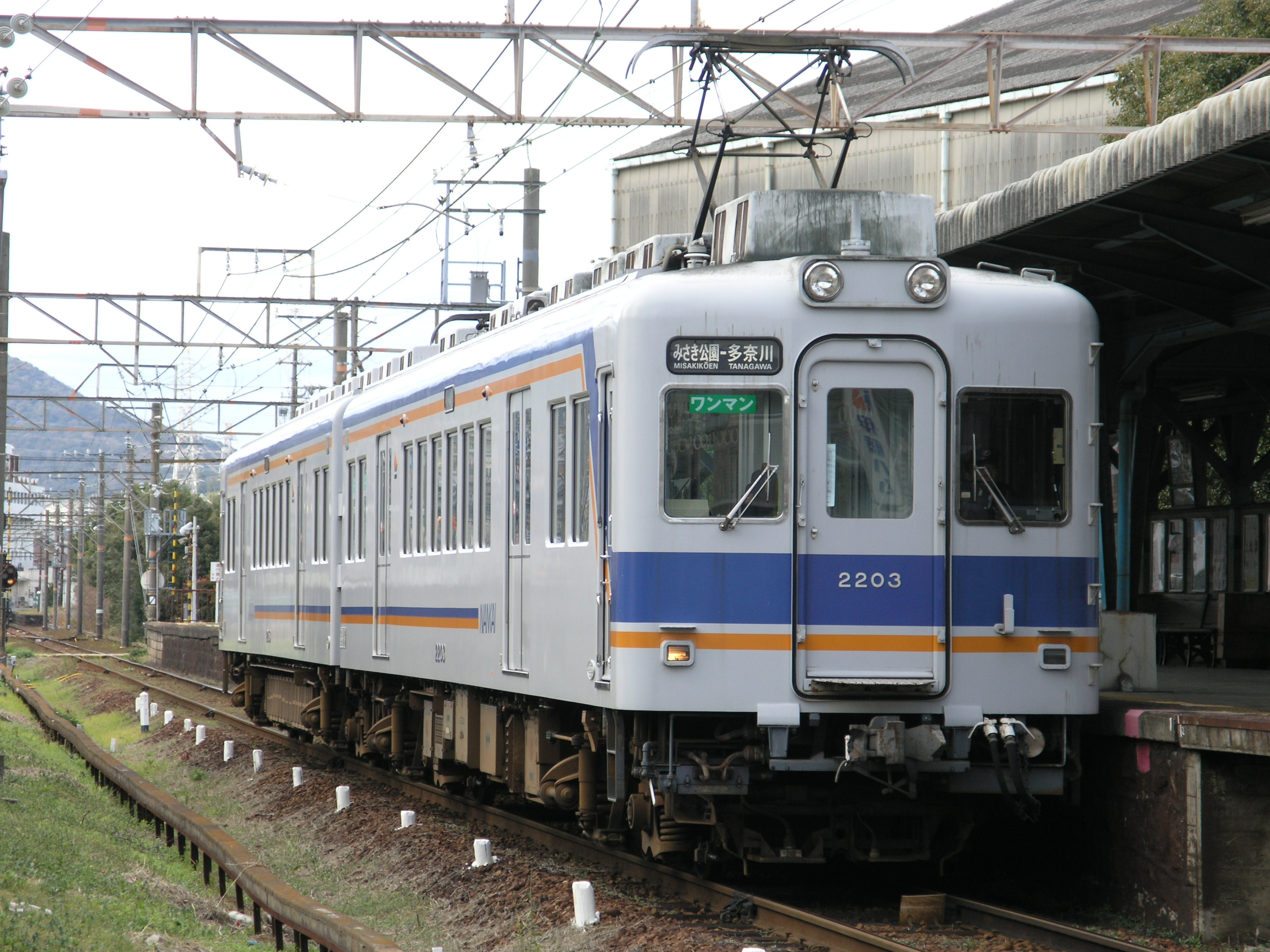
A 2200 series set in January 2008

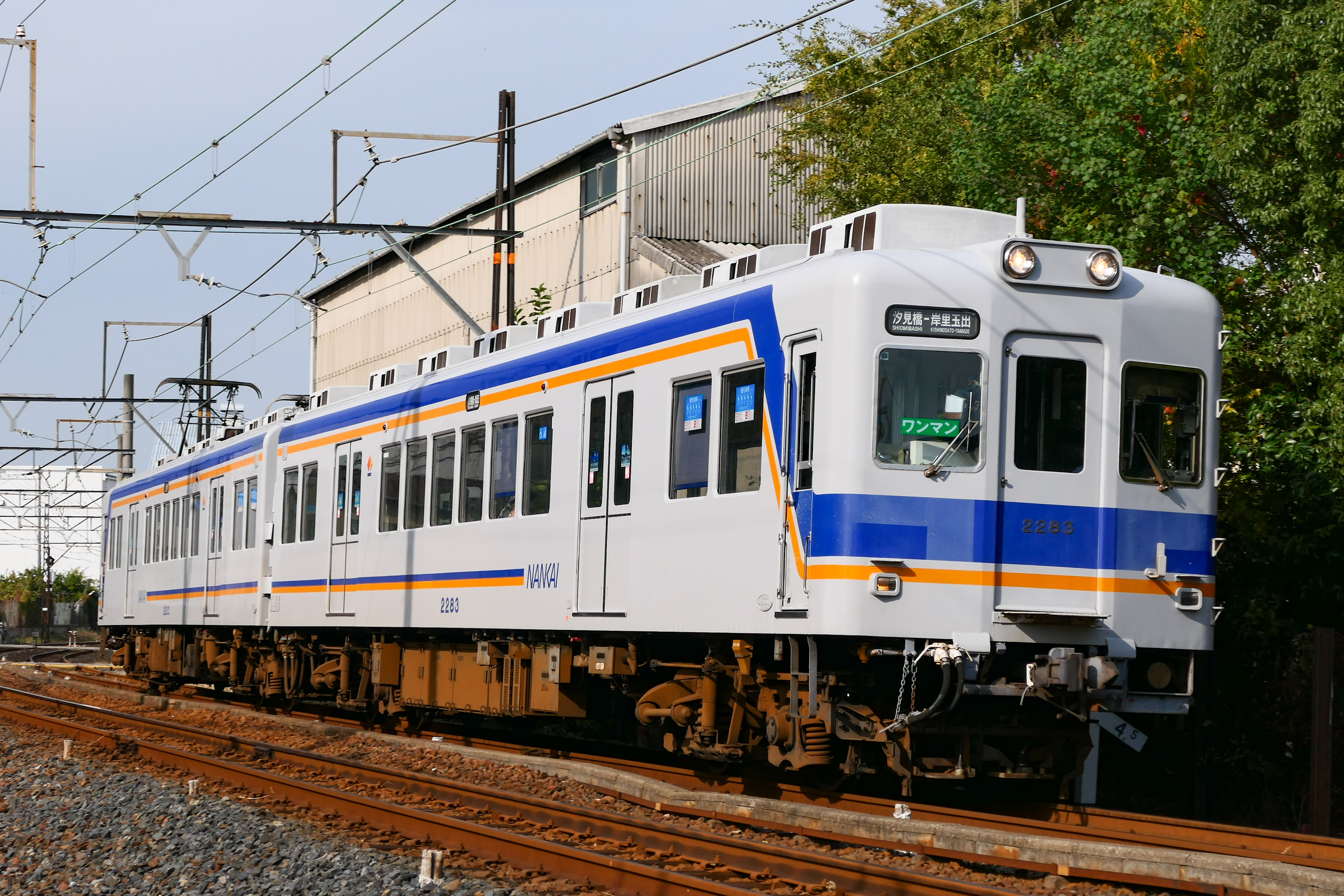
A 2230 series set on the Shiomibashi Line in November 2023

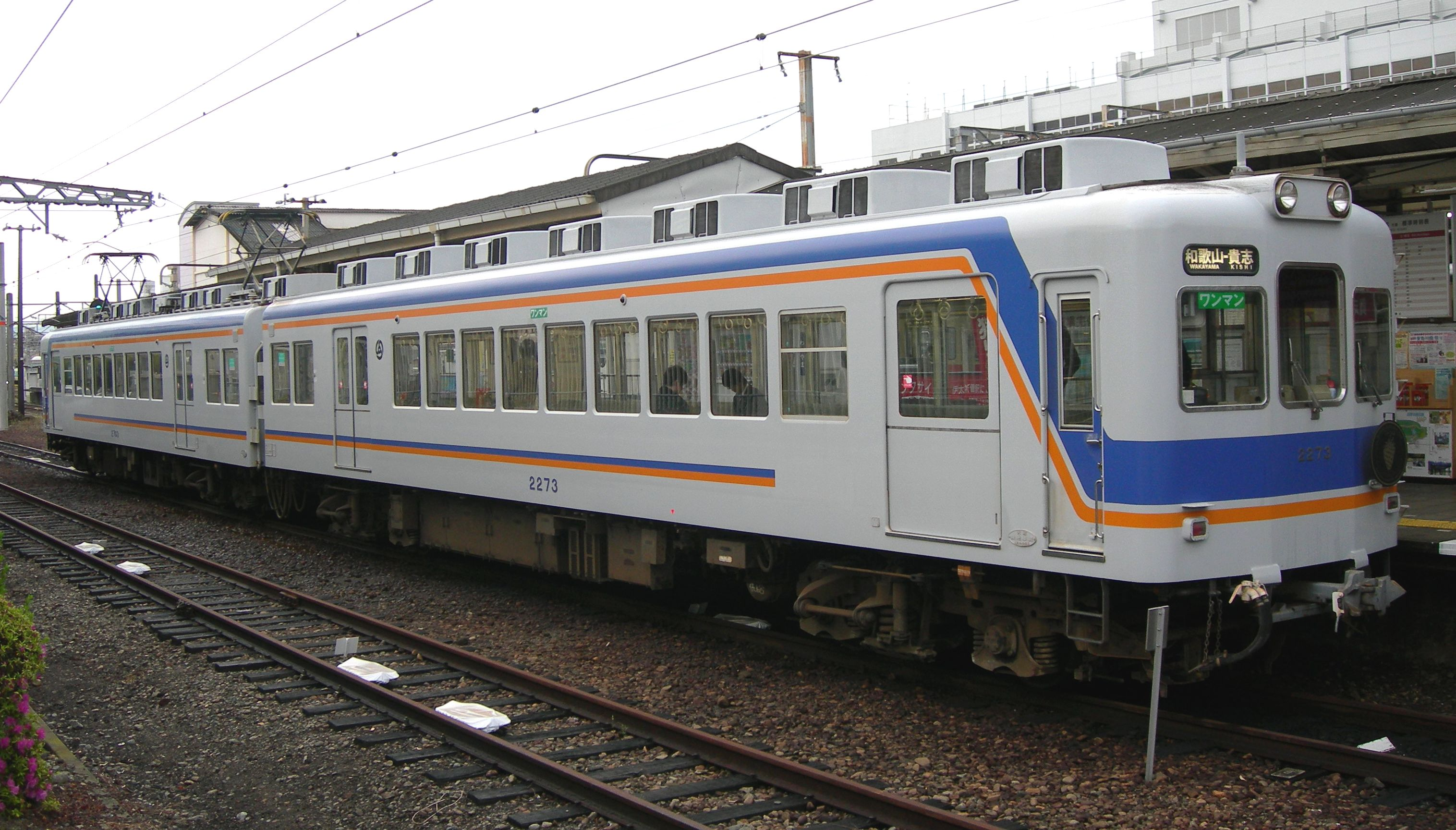
A 2270 series set in April 2011 after its transfer to Wakayama Electric Railway

Starting from 1994, with the introduction of newer 2000 series trains, the 22000 series fleet underwent conversions to become the 2200 series, except for four sets which were de-registered between 1997 and 1998. Some sets remained in service on the Koya Line after being converted to the 2200 series. Sets that were redeployed to branch lines in the Nankai network at the time of conversion were given the 2230 series designation while the sets that were moved to the Kishigawa Line were reclassified as the 2270 series. The 2230 series sets had the gangway frame on the front ends removed and the 2270 series sets had their gangwayed ends completely blocked and the passenger doors near the driver's cab relocated. In 1997, the Koya Line 2200 series sets were also relegated to branch line services.

From 2000 to 2001, the 2200 series fleet was modified for driver-only operation.

The new numbering convention for the converted 22000 series sets are as shown below.

| 22000 series numbering | MoHa 22000 (odd) | MoHa 22000 (even) |
| 2200 series numbering | MoHa 2200 | MoHa 2250 |
| 2230 series numbering | MoHa 2230 | MoHa 2280 |
| 2270 series numbering | KuHa 2700 | MoHa 2270 |

=== Interior ===
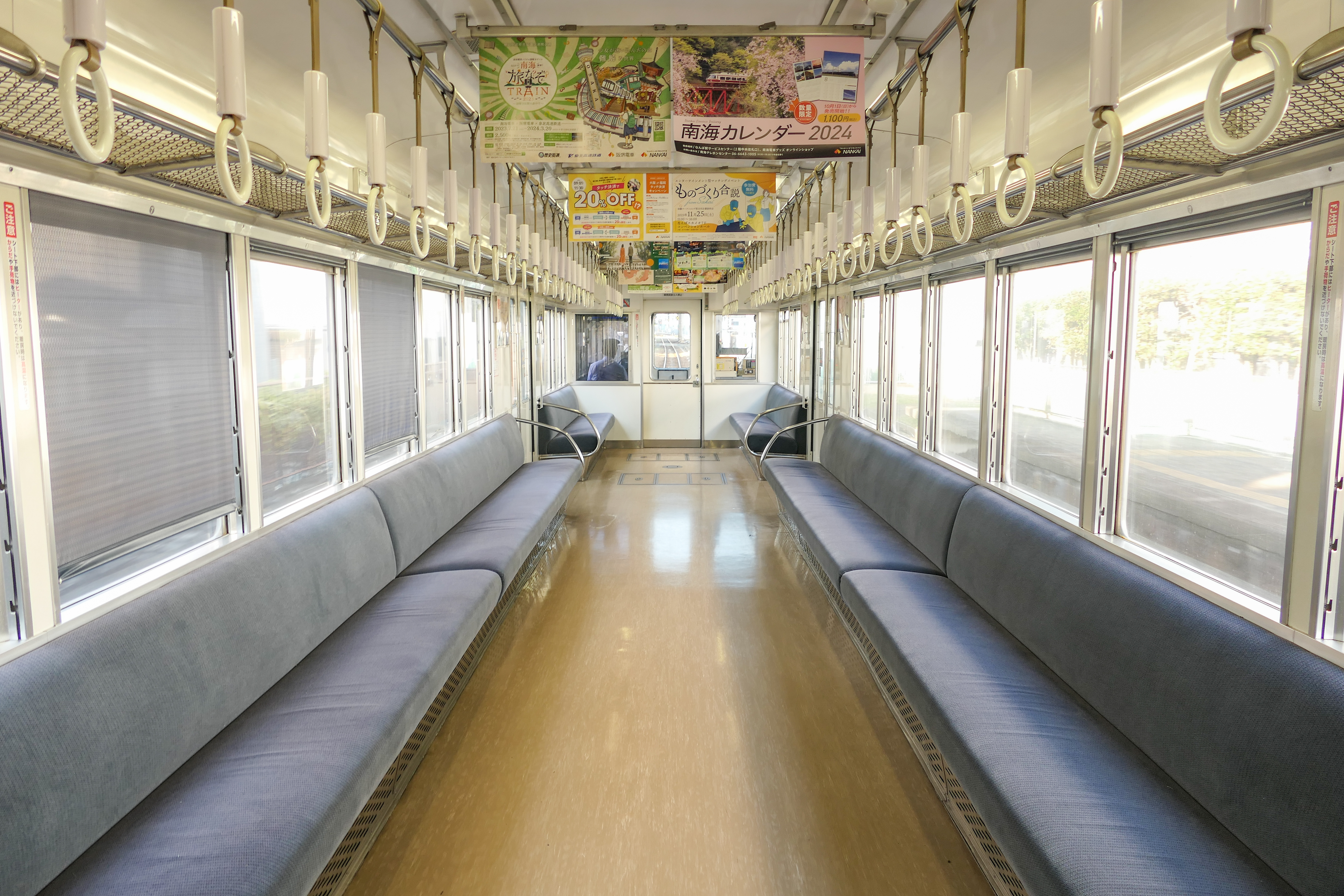
Interior view showing gray seat moquette

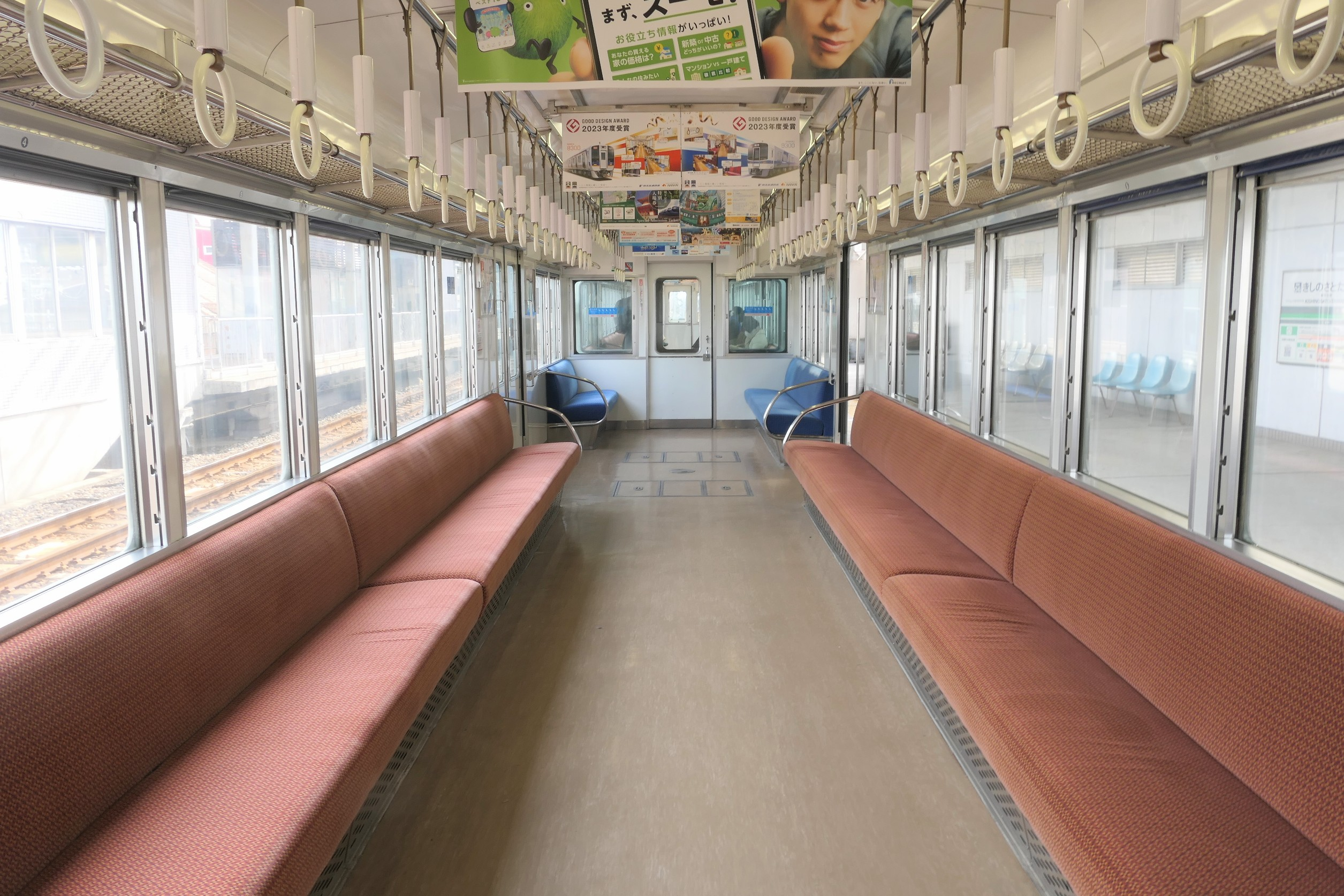
Interior view showing brown and blue priority seat moquette

=== Withdrawal ===
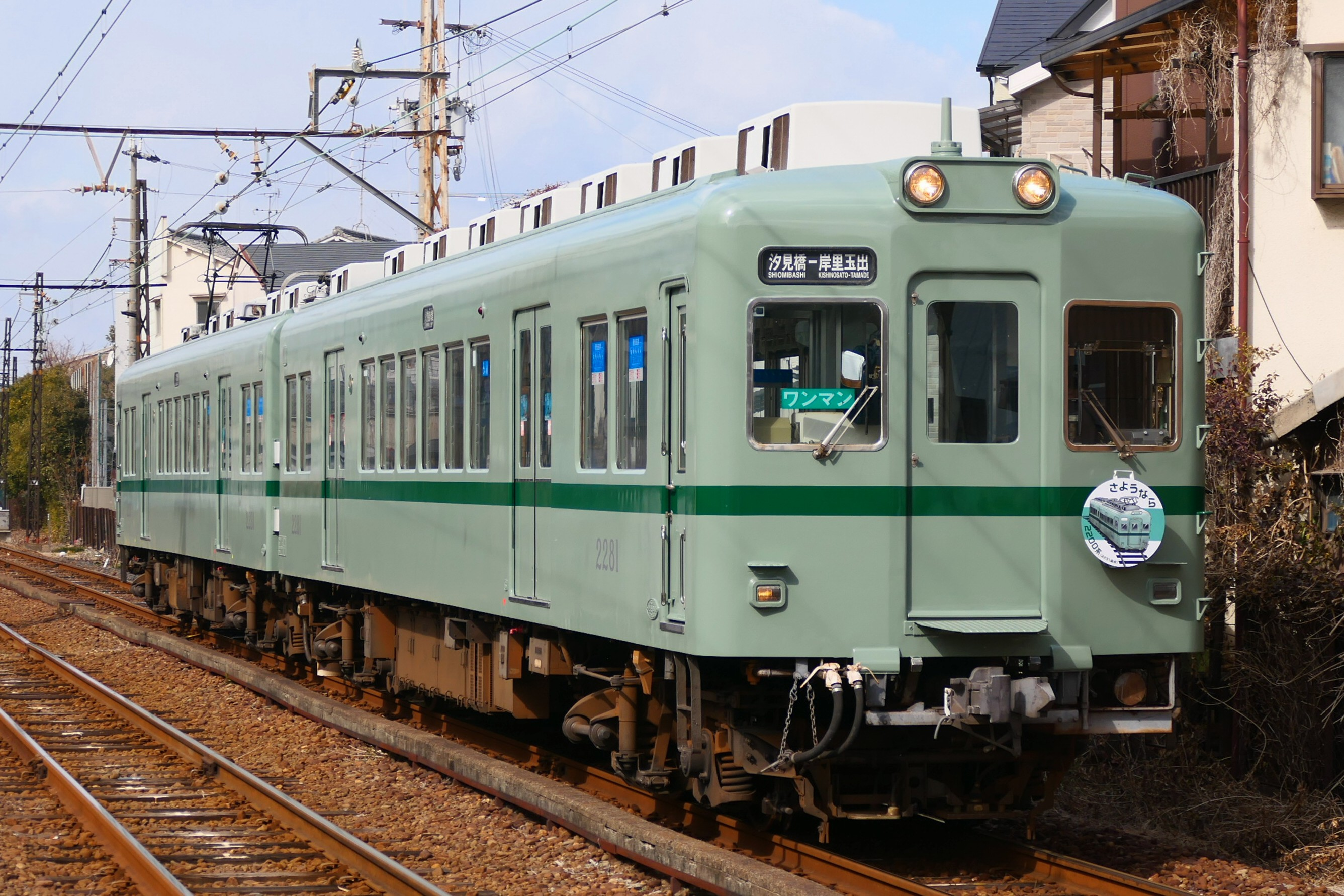
Set 2231 in original livery in February 2025

On 28 October 2022, Nankai announced that some 2000 series sets would be modified to accommodate driver-only operation on its branch lines to replace the 2200 series trains.

On 10 December 2024, the operator announced plans to phase out the remaining two general-use 2200 series sets by spring 2025. On 20 January 2025, set 2231 returned to service in the original livery of green with emerald stripes to commemorate that. Set 2231 was also the last general-use 2200 series set to be withdrawn from regular service in March 2025.

== Tenku ==
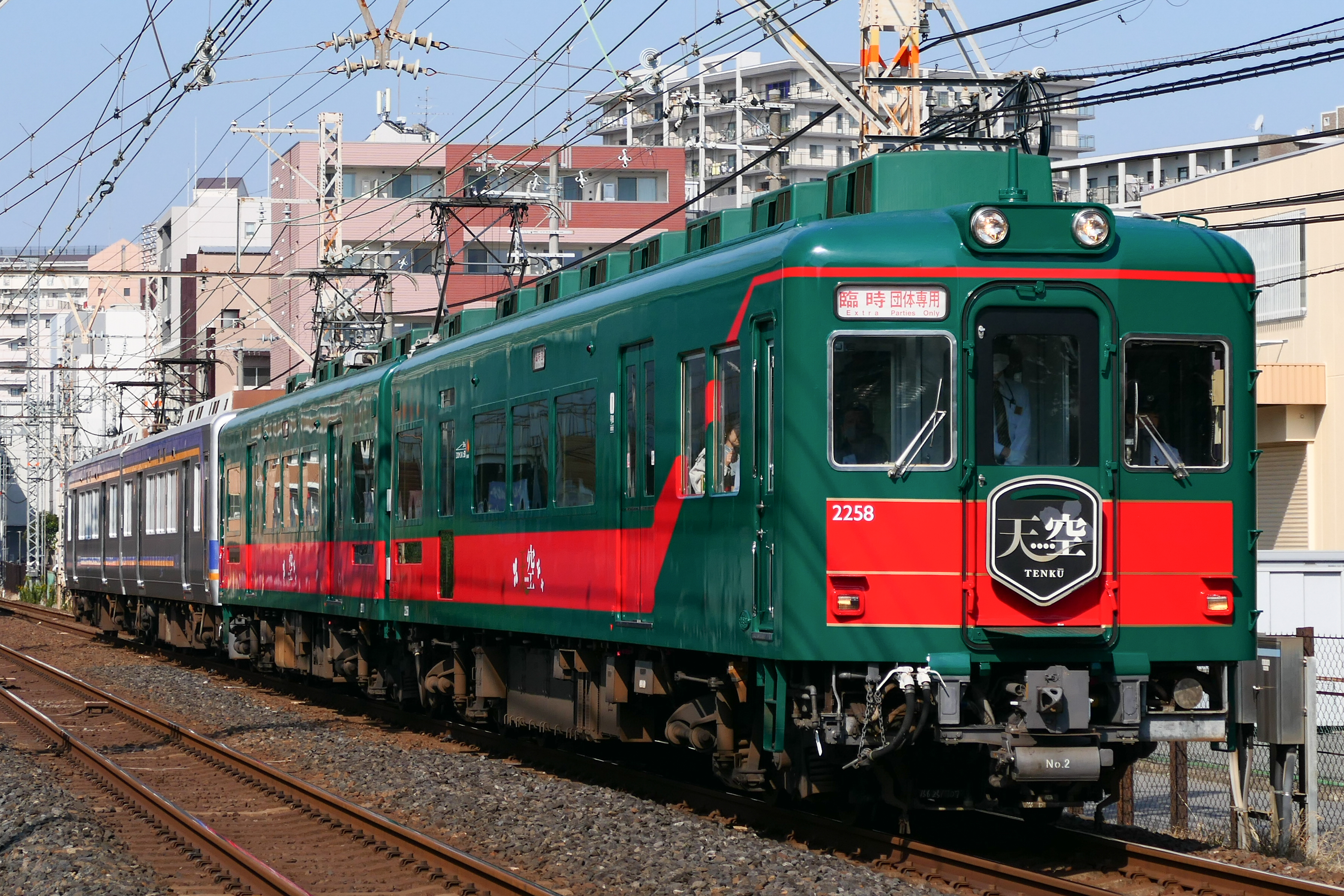
Set 2208 on the Koya Line in October 2023

On 2 September 2008, Nankai announced that a 2200 series set would be converted to a sightseeing train for use on the Koya Line between Hashimoto and Gokurakubashi. In December of that year, the name of the sightseeing train service was determined to be "Tenku". The refurbished set entered service on 3 July 2009.

As of 2025, it is the only 2200 series set to remain in revenue service.

=== Formation ===
The set is formed as shown below with car 1 at the Gokurakubashi end. A two-car general-use set is normally coupled to this set in revenue service.

| Car No. | 2 | 1 |
|---|---|---|
| Designation | Mc | Mc |
| Numbering | 2208 | 2258 |
| Former numbering | 2203 | 2253 |

- Car 2 has two scissors-type pantographs.

=== Interior ===
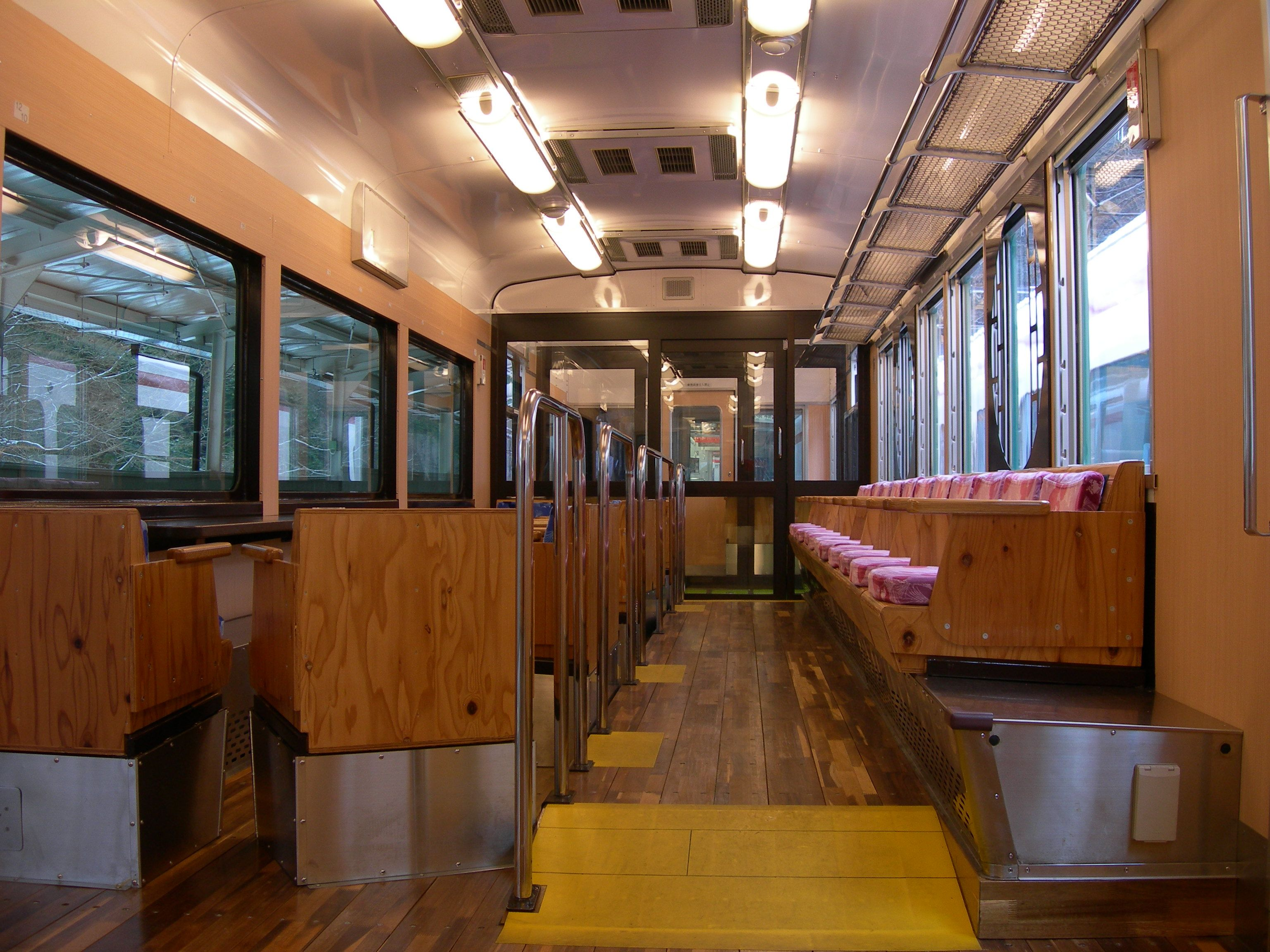
Interior of car 2208

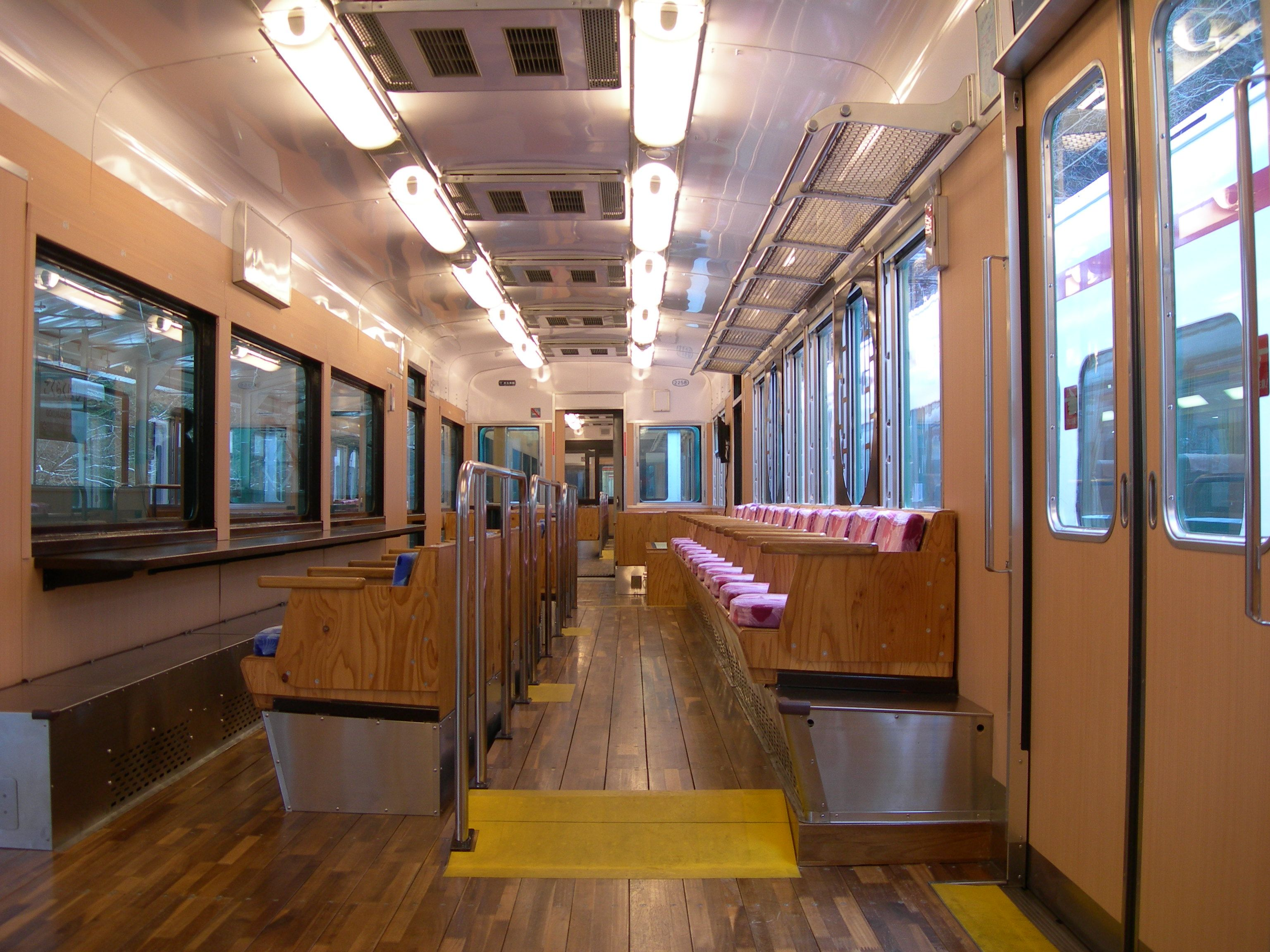
Interior of car 2258

=== Future plans ===
On 15 May 2025, Nankai announced plans to introduce a new four-car sightseeing train by the end of fiscal 2025 to replace the ageing Tenku set.

== Transfer to other operators ==
=== Kumamoto Electric Railway ===
One 22000 series set was sold to Kumamoto Electric Railway and classified as the 200 series. This set was modified with the addition of a third door on each side as well as new headlights. It entered service in 1998 and was retired after its final day of revenue service on 30 July 2019.

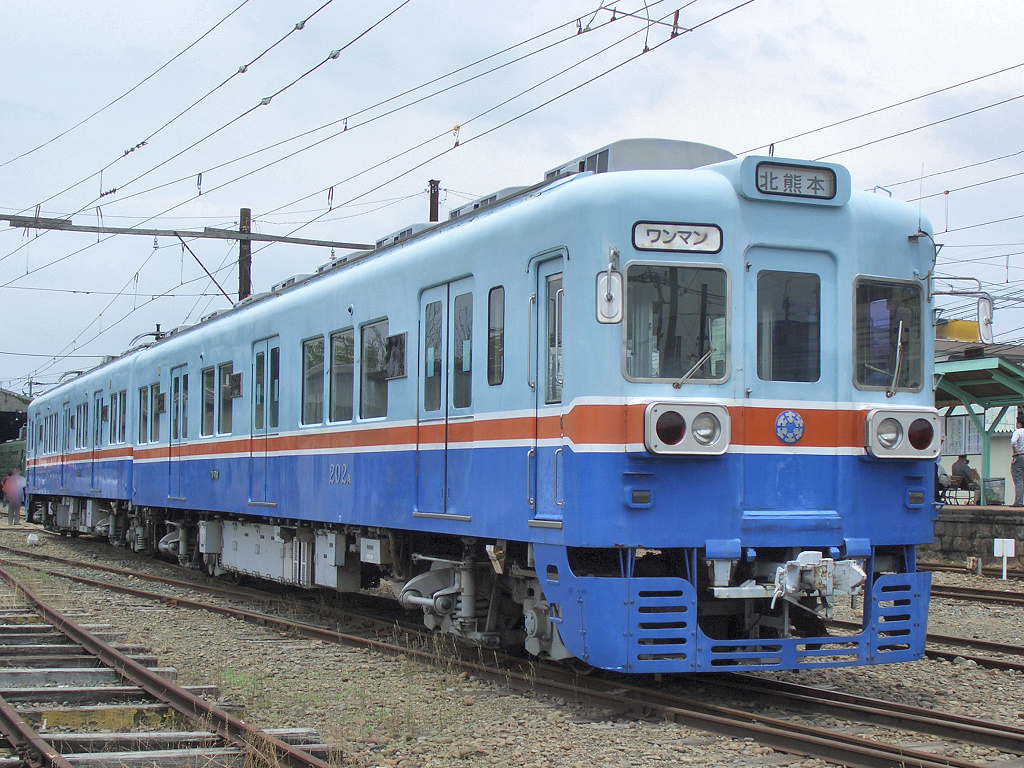
The Kumamoto Electric Railway 200 series set in May 2009

=== Wakayama Electric Railway ===
The 2270 series fleet was transferred to Wakayama Electric Railway when ownership of the Kishigawa Line was handed over from Nankai on 1 April 2006.

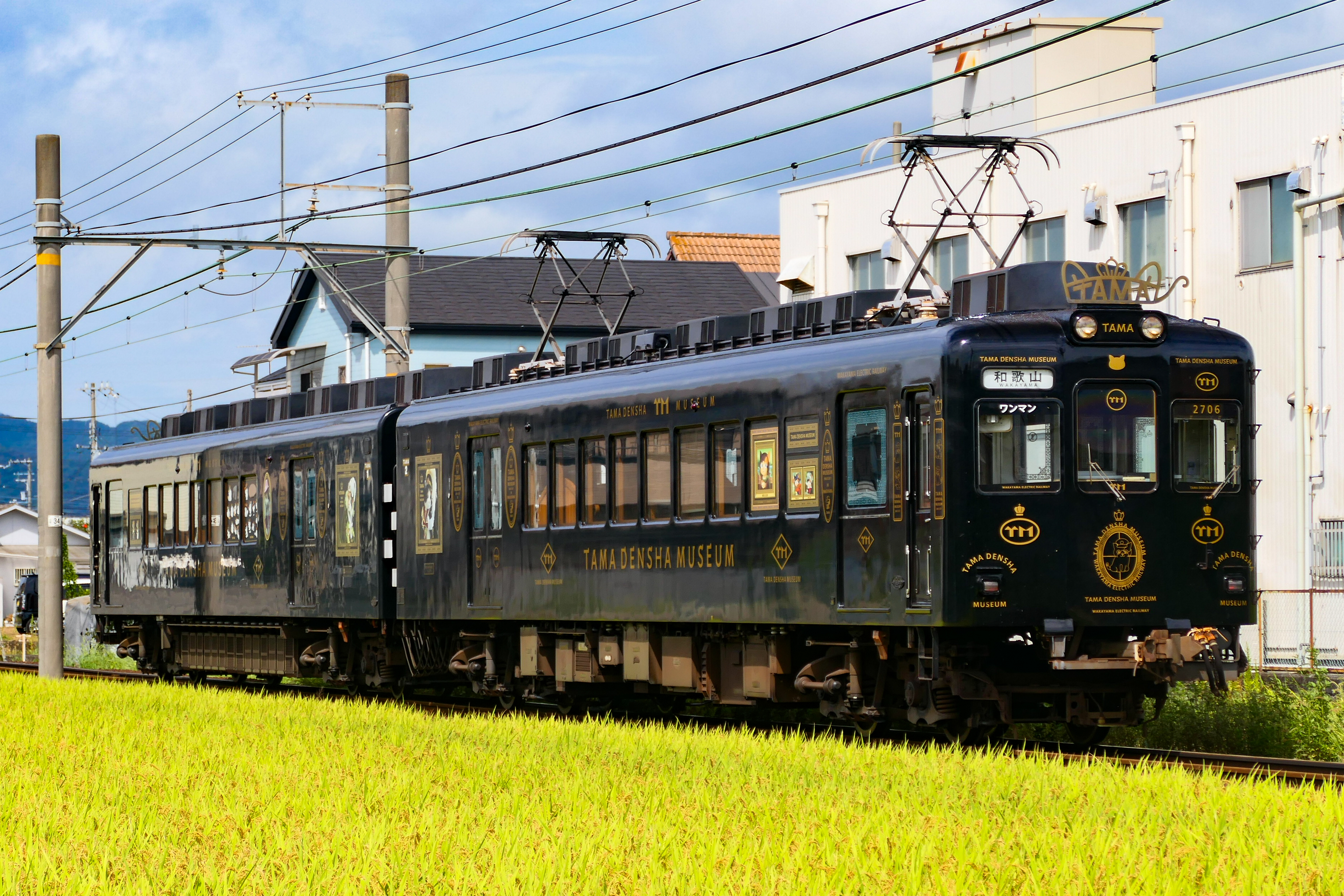
Refurbished Wakayama Electric Railway set 2276 on the Kishigawa Line in September 2023

=== Choshi Electric Railway ===
Two 2200 series sets were sold to Choshi Electric Railway in August 2023 and August 2024, and were converted to the Choshi Electric Railway 22000 series.

The details of the Choshi Electric Railway 22000 series fleet are as shown below.

| Car numbers | Former Nankai car identities | Entered service | Livery |
|---|---|---|---|
| 22005+22006 | 2201+2251 | 1 April 2025 | Revised Nankai livery |
| 22007+22008 | 2202+2252 | 29 March 2024 | Original Nankai livery |

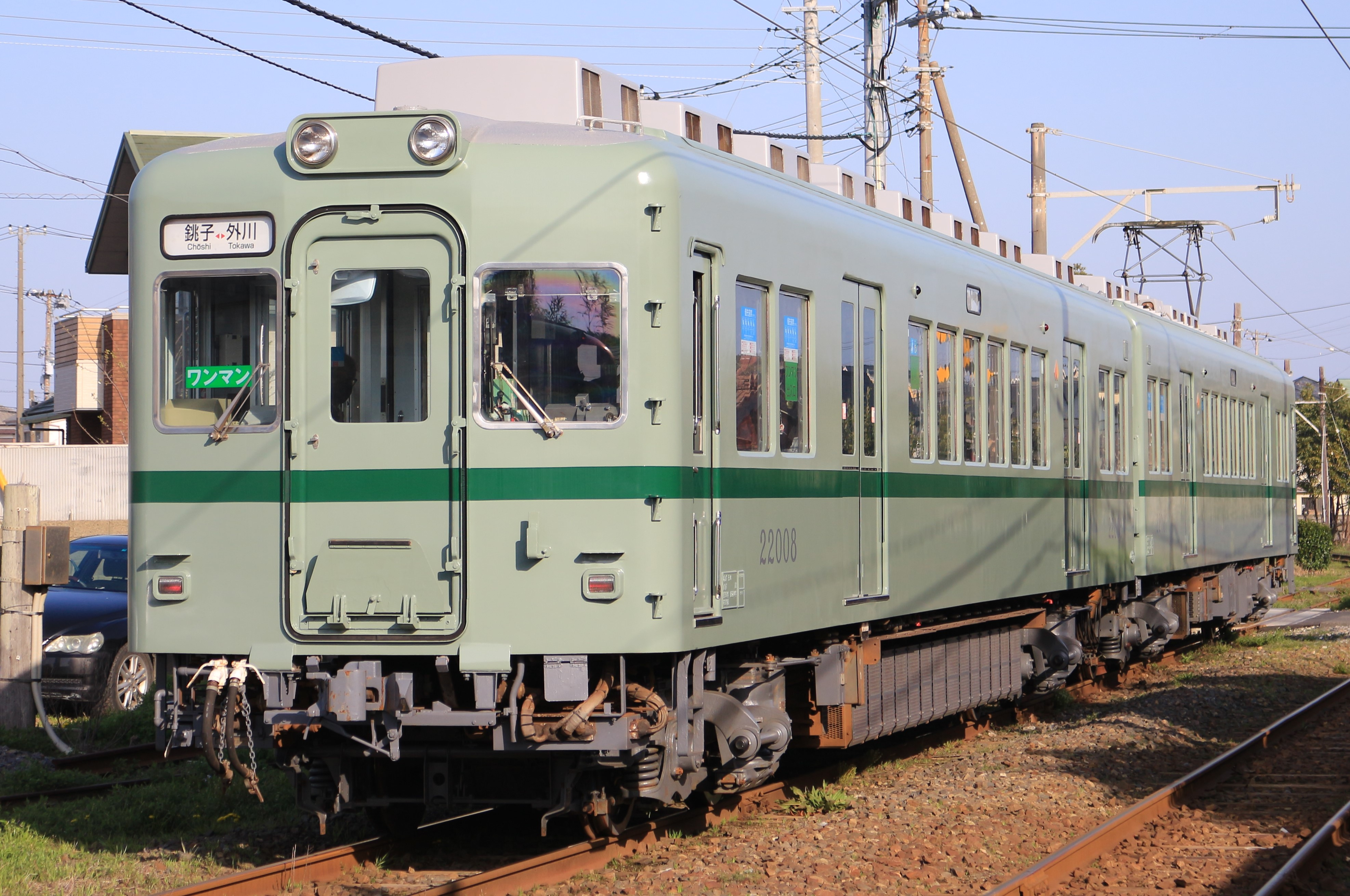
Choshi Electric Railway 22000 series cars 22007 and 22008 in March 2024
