= Nankai 2300 series =

Japanese train type

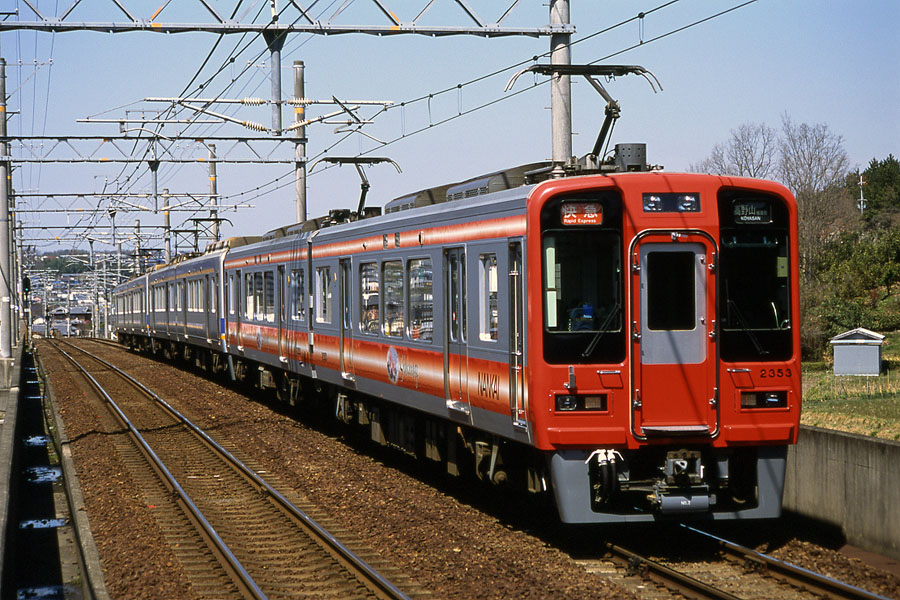
- A 2300 series set on a Rapid Express service, March 2006
- In service: 2005–
- Manufacturer: Tokyu Car Corporation
- Built at: Yokohama
- Family name: Zoom Car
- Constructed: 2004–2005
- Entered service: 31 March 2005
- Number built: 8 vehicles (4 sets)
- Number in service: 8 vehicles (4 sets)
- Formation: 2 cars per trainset
- Fleet numbers: 2301–2304
- Operators: Nankai Electric Railway
- Lines served: Nankai Kōya Line

Specifications
- Car body construction: Stainless steel
- Car length: 17,725 mm (58 ft 2 in)
- Width: 2,744 mm (9 ft 0 in)
- Height: 4,005 mm (13 ft 2 in)
- Doors: 2 pairs per side
- Maximum speed: 100 km/h (60 mph)
- Traction system: TDK6312-A (100 kW) x4 per motor car (Variable-frequency)
- Power output: 800 kW per 2-car set
- Acceleration: 3.1 km/(h⋅s) (1.9 mph/s)
- Deceleration: 3.8 km/(h⋅s) (2.4 mph/s) (service); 4.0 km/(h⋅s) (2.5 mph/s) (emergency)
- Electric system(s): 1,500 V DC
- Current collection: Overhead wire
- Bogies: FS-541B
- Multiple working: 2000 series, 2200 series
- Track gauge: 1,067 mm (3 ft 6 in)

The Nankai 2300 series (南海2300系) is a two-car electric multiple unit (EMU) train type operated by the private railway operator Nankai Electric Railway in Japan since 2005.

== Design ==
The 2300 series design was developed from the earlier 2000 series EMUs first introduced in 1990. The car bodies are stainless steel, with fibre-reinforced plastic (FRP) cab ends.

== Formation ==
As of 1 April 2012, the fleet consists of four two-car sets formed as shown below.

Designation	Mc1	Mc2
Numbering	2300	2350

The two cars are each fitted with one single-arm pantograph.

Each set has a sticker depicting a different flower on the body side as follows.

- 2301: Cherry blossom
- 2302: Flowering dogwood
- 2303: Rhododendron
- 2304: Cosmos

== Interior ==
Passenger accommodation consists of transverse seating arranged 2+1 abreast with seat backs that can be flipped over to face the direction of travel, and longitudinal bench seats at the ends of the cars.

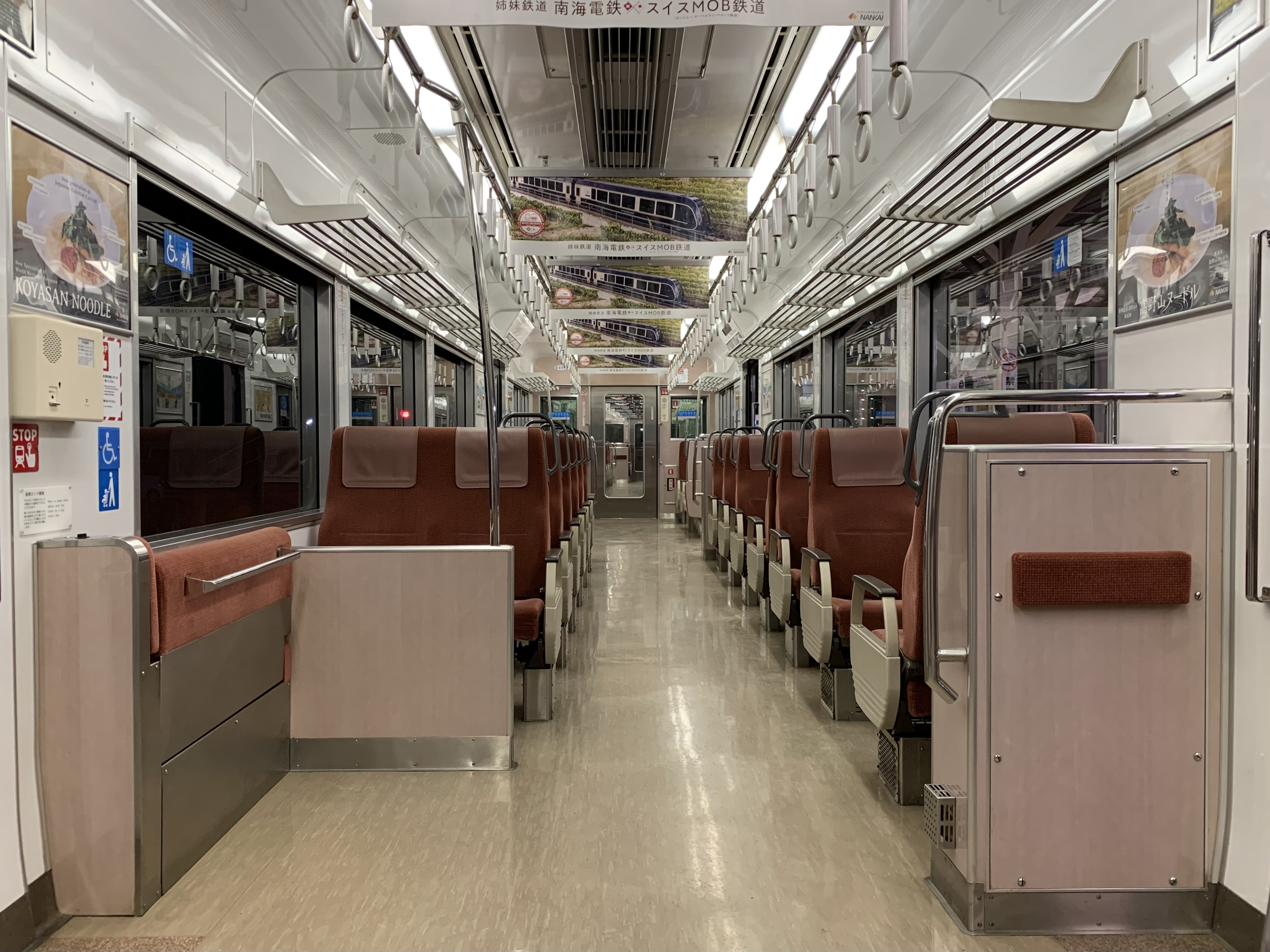
Interior view, January 2026
