= Driver-controlled operation =

Manual method of operating a train

Driver-controlled operation is the operation of a train in which the driver carries out all the essential roles needed to operate the train itself. It differs from driver-only operation (DOO, also called one-person operation) in that other members of staff also work on board—for example, revenue collectors.

Currently, only around 30% of Britain's journeys are either DCO or DOO, meaning the remainder require a guard to operate and thus, if there is no available guard, the service must be cancelled. In some cases, DCO means only the unavailability of a guard would not lead to the cancellation of a train, while other forms of DCO require a guard to remain present for the service to operate.

== Railways using DCO ==
A deal agreed between Greater Anglia (train operating company) and RMT union meant that all of their intercity and regional services would change to DCO. However, unlike other DCO in place in the UK, a guard could still operate the doors in exceptional circumstances and must still be present in order for the service to run. The only exceptions are on intercity services between Liverpool Street and Ipswich, and regional services between Ely and Stansted Airport, where trains were already cleared to run without guards.

Arriva Rail North were also hoping to agree a similar deal, however this was not achieved and on 1 March 2020, the Department for Transport took over operations as Northern Trains, who are also looking to implement DCO, so could be implemented in the future.

Other examples of DCO within the UK includes Abellio ScotRail and Southern and Southeastern longer distance routes and services.

Merseyrail have implemented DCO onboard their British Rail Class 777 fleet, requiring a signal from the Train Manager for the driver to begin the Close Door process, following a deal reached by the RMT after disputes with Merseyrail previously planning to run the trains with DOO.

South Western Railway have implemented DCO on London suburban services for its new fleet of British Rail Class 701 trains. The RMT has opposed to these changes and have held various strikes on many occasions including 27 days in December 2019.

In April 2021, a deal was agreed between South Western Railway and RMT. Whilst South Western Railway claimed to have implemented a DCO method for their inner suburban routes, unlike Southern, the guard would still be an essential crew member on the train and would be required to be onboard.
