= One-person operation =

Operation of a train, bus, or tram by one person

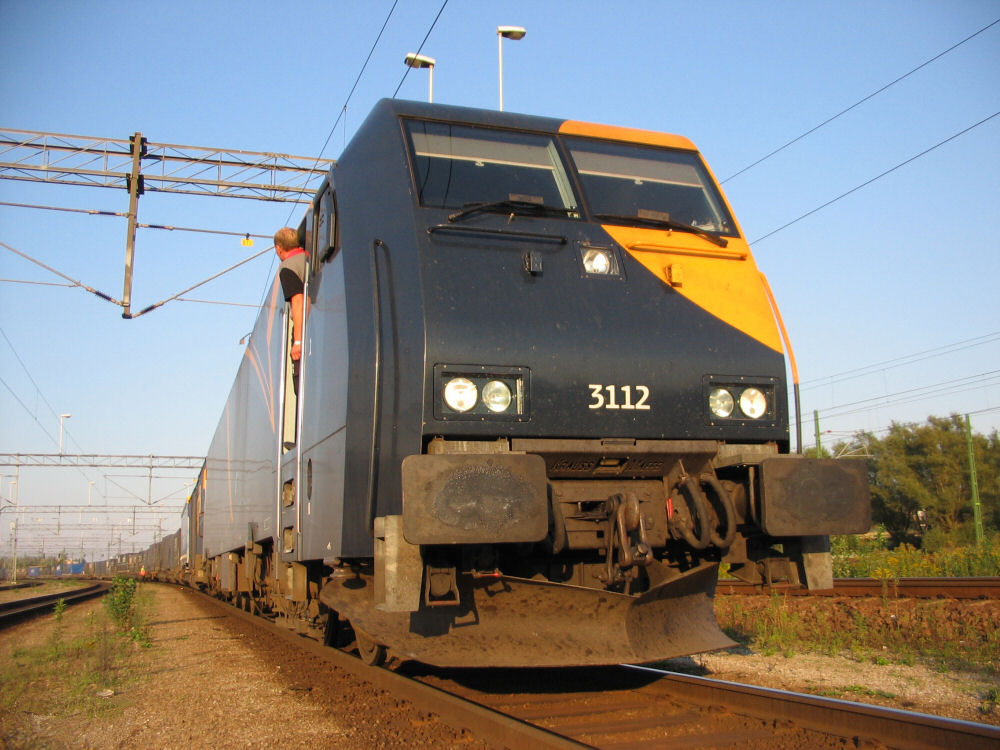
A freight train driver on a one-person operated DB Schenker Rail train in Denmark

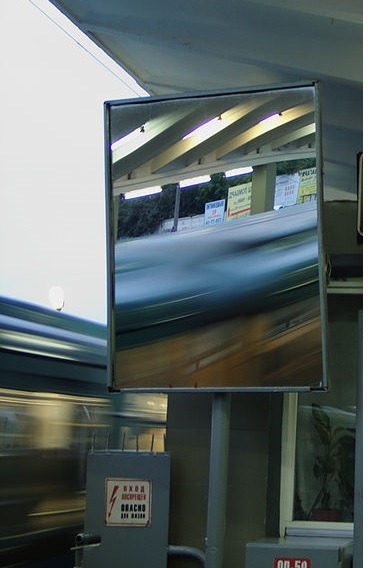
A platform mirror for driver-only operation at Vykhino station, Moscow Metro in Russia

One-person operation (OPO), also known as driver-only operation (DOO), one-man operation (OMO), single person train operation (SPTO), or one-person train operation (OPTO), similarly to driver-controlled operation, is operation of a train, bus, or tram by the driver alone, without a conductor.

On one-person operated passenger trains, the driver must be able to see the whole train to make sure that all the doors are safe for departure. On curved platforms a CCTV system, mirror or station dispatch staff are required.

Although extra infrastructure such as cameras and mirrors might require additional investment, one-person operation is usually faster and cheaper to implement than automatic train operation, requiring a smaller investment in, for example, platform intruder detection systems and track protection (fencing, bridge-caging, CCTV etc.). In some cases, one-person operation can be seen as an intermediate step towards automatic train operation.

While European freight trains are normally one-person operated, the larger North American freight trains are almost exclusively crewed by a conductor as well as the driver (commonly known in North America as the engineer).

While one-person operation is popular and on the rise among the train operating companies as it reduces the number of crew required and correspondingly reduces costs, it is for that reason controversial and is often strongly opposed by trade unions, arguing that it is an unsafe practice.

== Passenger trains ==
=== History ===
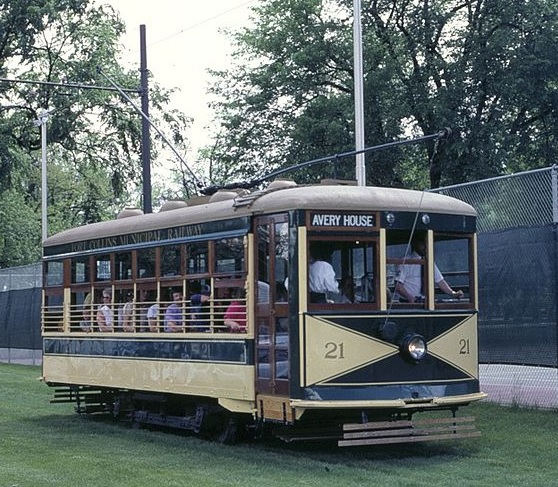
A Birney streetcar, one of the first public transport vehicles designed specifically for one-person operation

One of the first examples of a public transport vehicle that was developed specifically for one-person operation is the Birney streetcar introduced in the United States in 1916. The Birney was pre-equipped with one of the most important safety devices for enabling one-person operation – the dead man's switch. At the time (and to a certain extent also today) one of the most cited arguments against one-person operation was the safety risks to passengers and bystanders if the operator fell ill. The dead man switch ensured that the tram would stop in the event of an incapacitated driver. For this reason, the Birneys were also called "safety cars". Another critical feature of the Birney in dealing with safety issues from the critics of one-person operation was its compact size which eased the driver's view of the road and reducing the number of doors to a single one.

In the US, regardless of various technological solutions to resolve the safety issues of one-person operation, there was consistent resistance towards one-person operation among the drivers and conductors of the streetcars. Whenever the workforce was well-organized in unions – which was the case in around half of all cities with streetcar companies – any proposal of one-person operation would generally be challenged, regardless of whether the streetcar company was in serious financial difficulties. In many cities, it took a municipal ordinance to authorize one-person operation, thus also politicizing the subject. The result of all this was typically strikes and other industrial action whenever one-person operation was implemented.

While the Birney was one of the first public transport vehicles designed for one-person operation, it was not the first public transport vehicle to be equipped with a dead man's switch. In 1903, the Metropolitan District Railway equipped two of its A Stock trains with a dead man's switch. The switch was introduced so that one person could operate in the driving cab on their own, which became standard for all train companies operating the London Underground in 1908. Even though this did not make the trains one-person operated – seeing as the trains were still operated with a guard – it was one of the first steps towards it.

Besides the dead man's switch, the electrification and dieselisation of railways also helped reduce the required staff in the locomotive to a sole operator – as diesel and electric traction does not require a fireman to shovel coal into a boiler.

On the London Underground, the use of multiple units ended the need for a second crew member in the driving cab to assist with coupling at the terminal train station.

=== Australia ===
==== Adelaide ====
Adelaide Metro's metropolitan rail network is configured for driver-only operation, but also operates with Passenger Service Assistants (PSA). This is a safety role, but with a focus on customer service and revenue protection. Normally, the train driver operates the doors, but PSAs are also able to. The Ghan, the Indian Pacific and The Overland all feature train managers who perform a similar role, as did the Great Southern.

Pacific National trains between Adelaide and Port Augusta are occasionally driver-only operated.

==== Melbourne ====
The Melbourne suburban railway network (currently operated by train operating company Metro Trains Melbourne) began one-person operation in 1993, as part of a wider reform of public transport by the newly elected Kennett government. By 22 November 1995, all suburban trains were one-person operated.

==== Perth ====
The entire Transperth network is driver-only operated. Conversion to DOO initiated in the early 1990s when then new A-series trains were introduced.

Pacific National trains between Kewdale and West Merriden are occasionally driver-only operated.

=== Canada ===
==== Toronto subway ====
The Toronto subway system, operated by the Toronto Transit Commission (TTC), uses a mix of one-person and two-person train operation.

- Line 3 Scarborough: Complete OPTO since the beginning of operation on 22 March 1985.
- Line 4 Sheppard: Entire line converted to OPTO in October 2016.
- Line 1 Yonge-University: Entire line converted to OPTO since 20 November 2022.
- Line 2 Bloor-Danforth: Still uses two-person crews on the entire line. Future plans include the introduction of OPTO over the next decade after the implementation of automatic train control (ATC) which would require new rolling stock as the current T series is not compatible with ATC.

Since its opening in 1985, the light-metro Line 3 Scarborough has operated with a single operator, while the heavy-rail Line 1 Yonge-University, Line 2 Bloor-Danforth and Line 4 Sheppard all originally operated with two-person crews of a train operator and guard (conductor). The guard is responsible for operating the doors, as well as observing the platform.

On 9 October 2016, OPTO was implemented on the heavy-rail Line 4, which uses four-car sets of Bombardier Toronto Rockets. According to a 2016 presentation, OPTO is "one of the TTC's key modernization efforts" as a cost-saving measure. The Toronto Rocket trains were altered to include a train door monitor system uses cameras to display a clear view of train doors while maintaining unobstructed views of the track and signals. The cameras replace the role of the train guard who used to observe the platform for safety. However, this system was not adequate to keep passengers safe, as there has been a 50% increase of dangerous "red light violations", or train operators not stopping for stop signals, after OPTO implementation on the Sheppard subway, due in part to the sole train operator having to both monitor the cameras and simultaneously operate the vehicle.

It was expected that Line 1 would have had OPTO implemented in 2019, and Line 2 would follow with OPTO in 2021. However, delays in implementing automatic train control (ATC), which allows trains to be run entirely by computers to remove the need for the guard, has caused those dates to be pushed back. Line 1 was fully converted to OPTO in November 2022; however, a conversion of Line 2 to ATC and OPTO has been pushed out indefinitely.

In 2020, a Mainstreet Research survey of Torontonians revealed that the public strongly opposed OPTO on Line 1 Yonge-University. More than 6-in-10 respondents disapproved of OPTO, and three-quarters disapproved of the TTC's decision not to inform the public of the plan to implement OPTO. In 2021, a Corbett Communications survey of Torontonians produced similar results: 7-in-10 respondents disapproved of OPTO, and 7-in-10 disapproved of the fact that the TTC decided to not offer public consultation on the issue. This survey also revealed that 6-in-10 Torontonians would feel unsafe riding in a train operated by just one staff member.

Line 5 Eglinton and Line 6 Finch West, the TTC's future light rail lines under construction as of 2022, will use one-person operation. Line 5 will also use ATC in its tunneled section.

==== Greater Toronto Area ====
GO Transit in Ontario operates with a conductor and engineer in the cab, as well as a conductor called a "Customer Service Ambassador" located within the train who is responsible for controlling the doors and making announcements.

==== Via Rail ====
Via Rail operates with two locomotive engineers and several on-board staff.

==== Montreal Metro ====
The Montreal Metro operates with one-person crews.

==== Light rail ====
All Canadian light rail systems are either DOO or driver-controlled operation.

=== Denmark ===
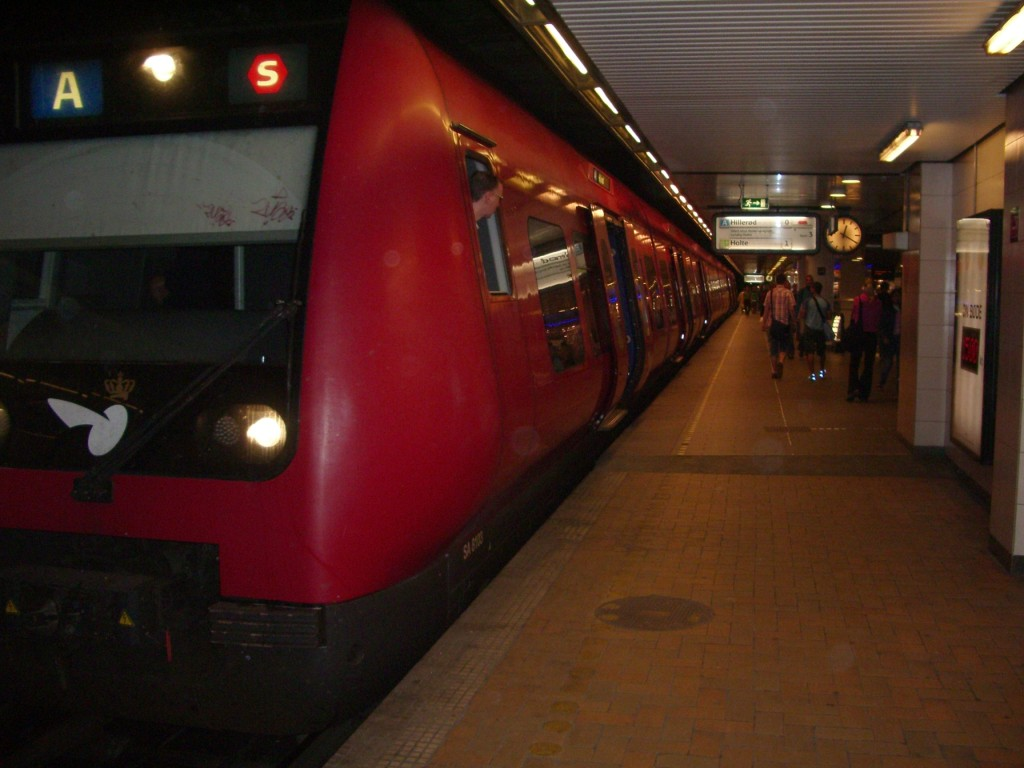
A Danish train driver on a S-train looking out of the side window to make sure all the doors are safely closed for departure

In Denmark, the state owned railway company DSB started implementing one-person operation on the commuter rail S-train system in 1975. The S-train system has been completely one-person operated since 1978.

At the start of 2013 DSB also used one-person operated trains on the two small regional rail lines Svendborgbanen and Aarhus nærbane.

As a result of several years of major annual deficits, DSB started implementing one-person operation on several rail lines on 29 June 2013. This led to reductions in staff, followed by widespread protest and some small illegal strikes by train drivers, who accused DSB of using rolling stock which was unsafe for one-person operation. The Danish Railway Union stated in 2011 "that one-person operation wasn't their cup of tea".

The lines that were planned to become one-person operated were: Copenhagen-Ringsted, Copenhagen-Kalundborg, Copenhagen-Nykøbing F., Aarhus-Aalborg, Fredericia-Esbjerg and Roskild-Køge-Ringsted The one-person operation of the railway line Aarhus-Aalborg was implemented using temporary and very manual safety procedures – much to the dissatisfaction of the train drivers. On 17 July 2013 DSB abandoned these temporary manual safety procedures and resumed to operate the Jutlandic regional trains with guards, on the grounds that the safety of their trains was not to be cast in doubt and that this was more important than "whether or not one-man operation was implemented a month or two latter than planned". DSBs preparations of the lines permanent standard procedures for one-person operation did however prove to be more difficult than first anticipated. As of September 2015 DSB was only planning to use one-person operation at the local lines north and south of Aalborg – and far from all the way to Aarhus. DSB has also stated that the rest of the remaining timeline for implementing one-person operations will be re-evaluated DSB has pointed to a bureaucratic safety approval system with an independent safety assessor as the main reason for the lack of progress.

On 7 June 2013, the Danish Ministry of Transport decided to implement one-person operation on the tendered Coastal Line, which led to the sacking of 50 guards. The one-person operation was set to start from 15 December 2013. Meanwhile, sickness absence among the sacked guards rose to six times the normal levels, resembling "sick-out" strike action. This compelled the train operating company DSB Øresund to offer the sacked guards a "stay healthy bonus" of up to 5000 Danish kroner per month (about US$900 or GB£600). The safety approval of one-person operation on the Coastal Line is part of a joint DSB one-person operation project, which entails that the Coastal Line will not be one-person operated before DSB has managed to obtain safety approval for other lines first. In August 2015 DSB stated that they would reevaluate whether or not they would implement one person operation on the Coastal Line. DSB stated at the same time, that they did not expect one man operation to be implemented on the Coastal Line in 2015.

The trains operated by Arriva on the rural single-track railways of Jutland have been one-person operated since Arriva won a tender to operate the lines in 2003. The small train company Nordjyske Jernbaner which operates in the sparsely populated most northern parts of Denmark also uses exclusively one-person operated trains. The railway companies Regionstog and Lokalbanen, operating the single-track railways of Zealand, use solely one-person operated trains as well.

On all Danish one-person operated passenger trains, ticket inspectors still board the train now and then to perform spot checks.

=== France ===
Several systems within France are DOO.

==== Marseille ====
The Marseille Metro is entirely operated using driver-only operation.

==== Paris ====
Various Paris Métro lines and all of the Tramways in Île-de-France routes and lines are driver only operated, with 2 metro lines currently operating completely unattended.

=== Germany ===
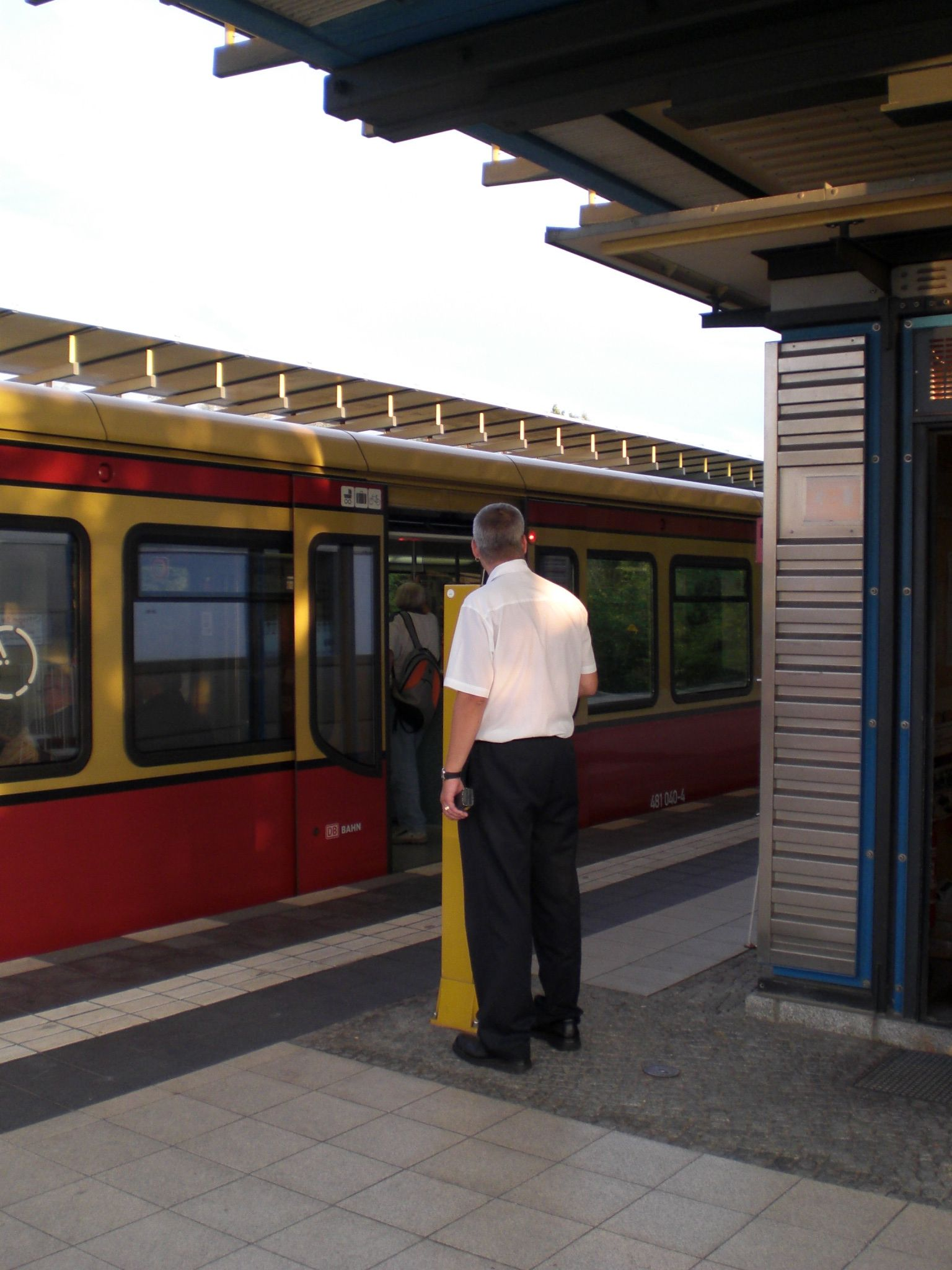
Classic platform dispatcher with central control – the operated electric switch is connected to the signal at the start of the platform that the train driver can see.

The S-Bahn rapid transit system in Berlin and Hamburg were using platform train dispatchers to ensure all doors are closed and a train can safely start for the next section. Although there were a couple of test runs since the 1970s these mass rapid transit systems were the last train systems in Germany to be converted to a one-person operation as rapid transit requires to ensure a minimum time to call at a station especially in rush hours. In Hamburg the "Selbstabfertigung durch den Triebfahrzeugführer" SAT (self-dispatching by the train driver) was first introduced in 2000 and the last station was becoming unstaffed in 2006. On the bigger Berlin S-Bahn network the "Zugabfertigung durch den Triebfahrzeugführer" ZAT (train dispatching by the train driver) was introduced in 2006. However it was only used on straight platforms so far.

Since 2014 the Berlin S-Bahn has used a system where an electronic monitor is in the driver's cab. There is a camera on the platform that transmits the images via wireless LAN to the train and the train has a connection back to the (existing) loudspeakers on the platform. The system was tested since 2007 but safety concerns caused its introduction to be held off for several years. Since its introduction, platforms may be served in one-person operation by ZAT-oU or the ZAT-FM, which is the old "Zugabfertigung durch den Triebfahrzeugführer ohne technische Unterstützung" ZAT-oU (train dispatching by train driver without technical support) or the new "Zugabfertigung durch den Triebfahrzeugführer mittels Führerraum-Monitor" ZAT-FM (train dispatching by train driver with driver cab monitor). Officials pointed out that the one-person operation does even lower the time a train halts on a station – on the busy central lines the train on one side of the platform did often have to wait for the train in the opposite direction on the other side of the platform to be dispatched. Although most of the central lines will be converted to ZAT-FM, there will be about 20 stations left in the network that will continue to have platform dispatchers.

=== Ireland ===
Most trains operating in Ireland are driver-only operated.

=== Japan ===
In Japan, passenger trains without a conductor are indicated by a small green headsign reading "one man" (Japanese: ワンマン, Hepburn: wanman), often accompanied by a pre-recorded in-car announcement that it is a "one man train".

Most buses are also one-person operations. In most cases, when not using an IC card, a numbered ticket (整理券, seiri-ken) is taken when boarding the vehicle. This slip of paper has a number and/or barcode which corresponds to the station at which the passenger boarded; since fare is typically calculated by distance traveled, the current fare from each previous stop is shown by a screen on board. When disembarking, passengers pay in cash at a fare collection box at the exit.

An increasing number of subways are moving to one-person operation, including the Nagahori Tsurumi-ryokuchi Line, which was designed to operate on one-person operation, the Toei Ōedo Line, which was one-person operated since its opening in the year 1990, and the Tokyo Metro Marunouchi Line, which became driver-only operated from 2009.

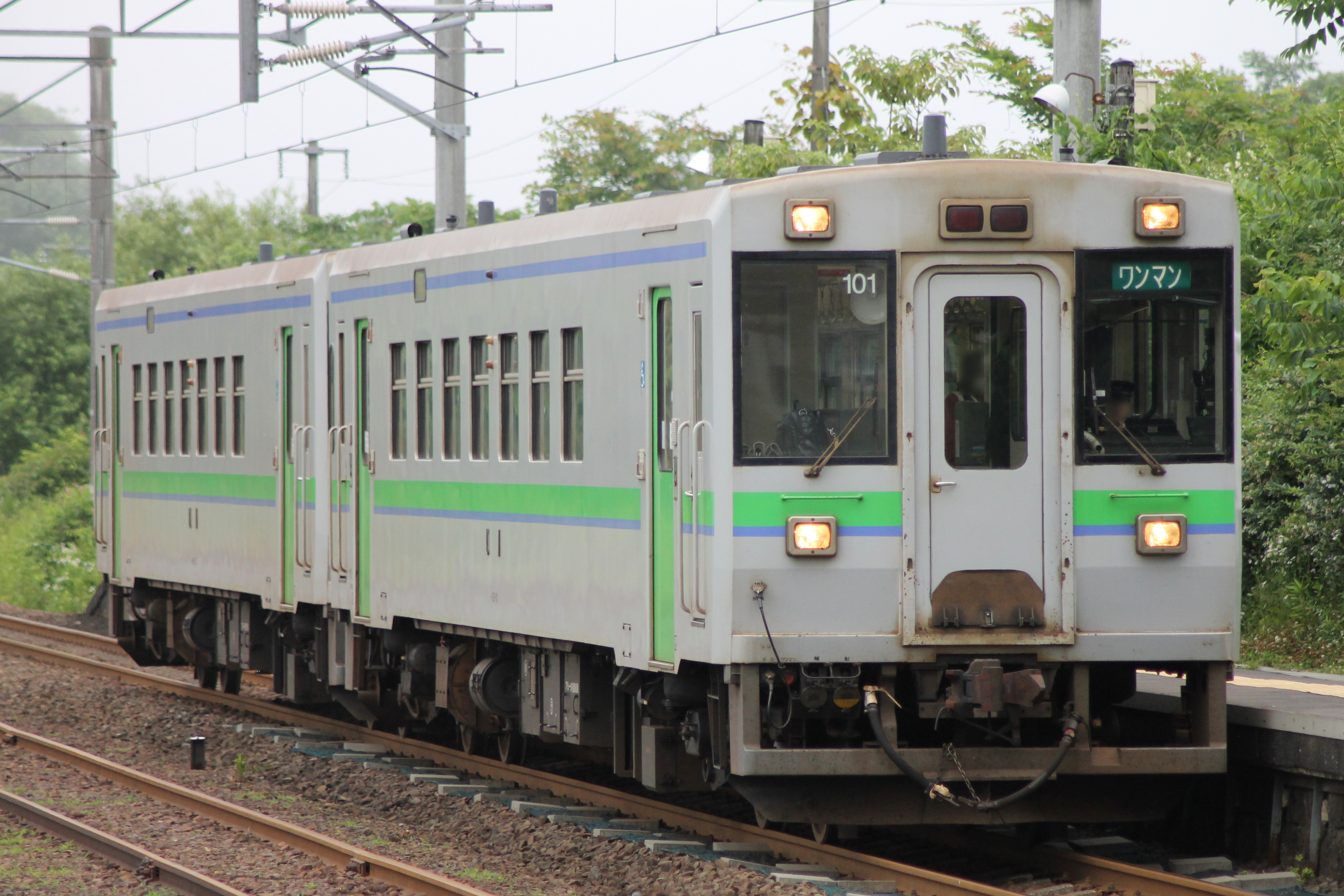
A wanman train on the Muroran Main Line. Notice the green sign above the driver window saying wanman (ワンマン).

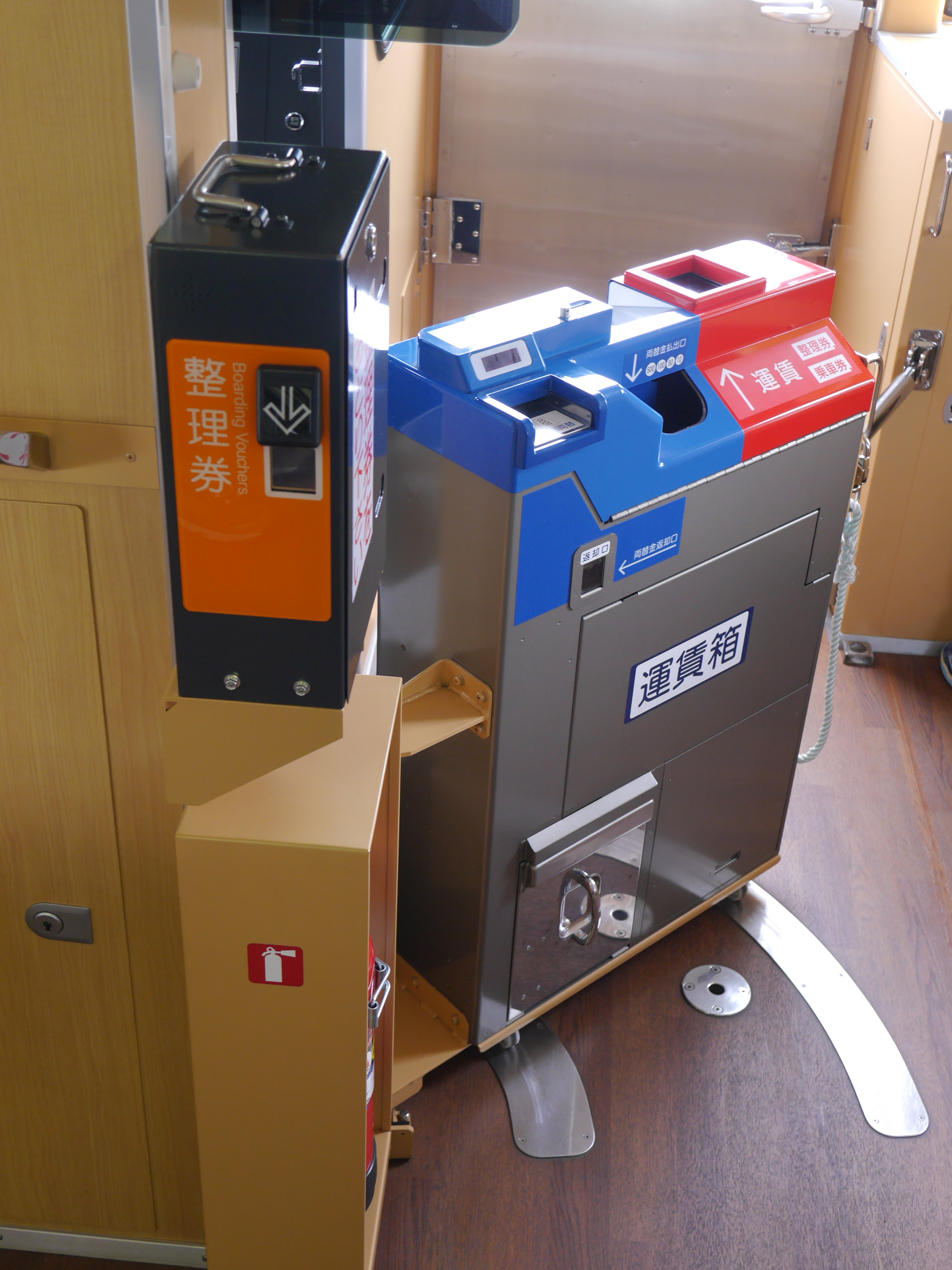
A fare box on a Shigaraki Kohgen Railway train. The blue section is a change machine, while the red section is where the customer pays. A boarding voucher dispenser is pictured to the left.

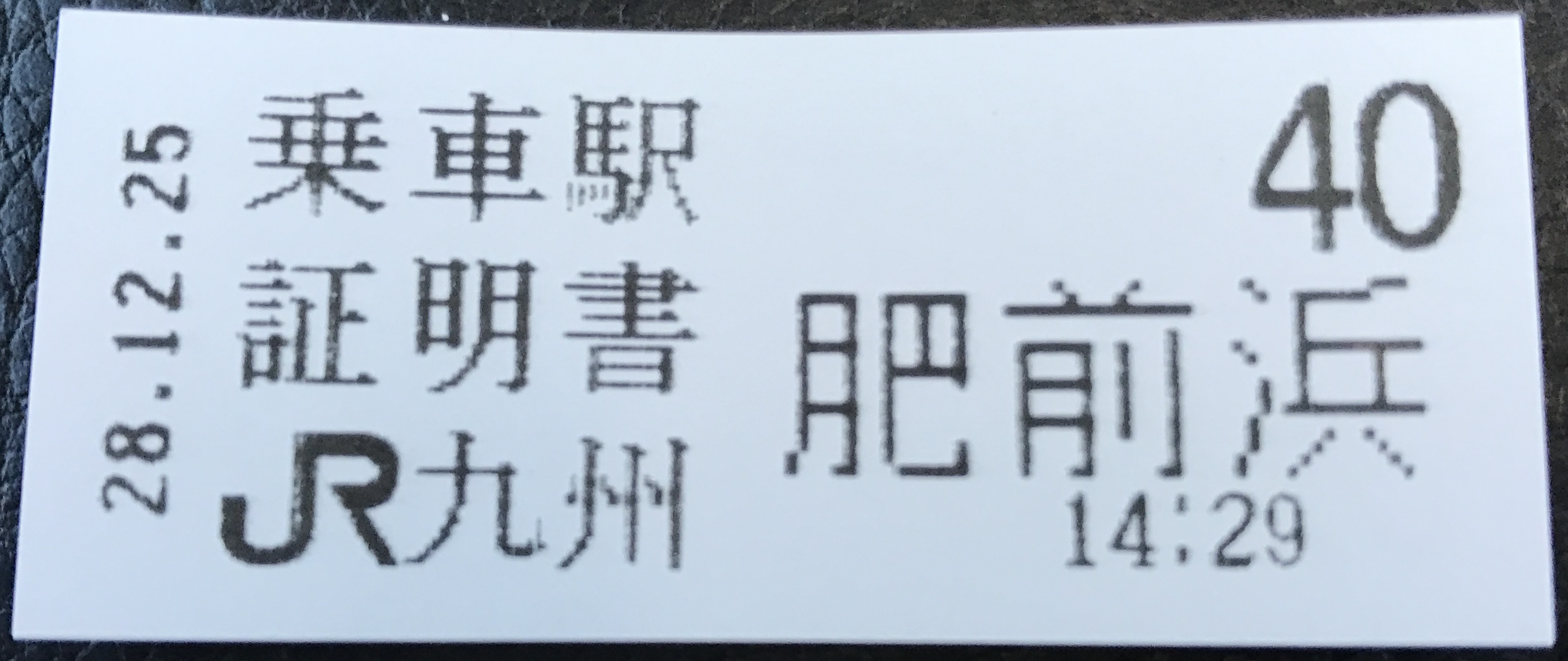
A boarding voucher printed with the number and station where the passenger boarded the train

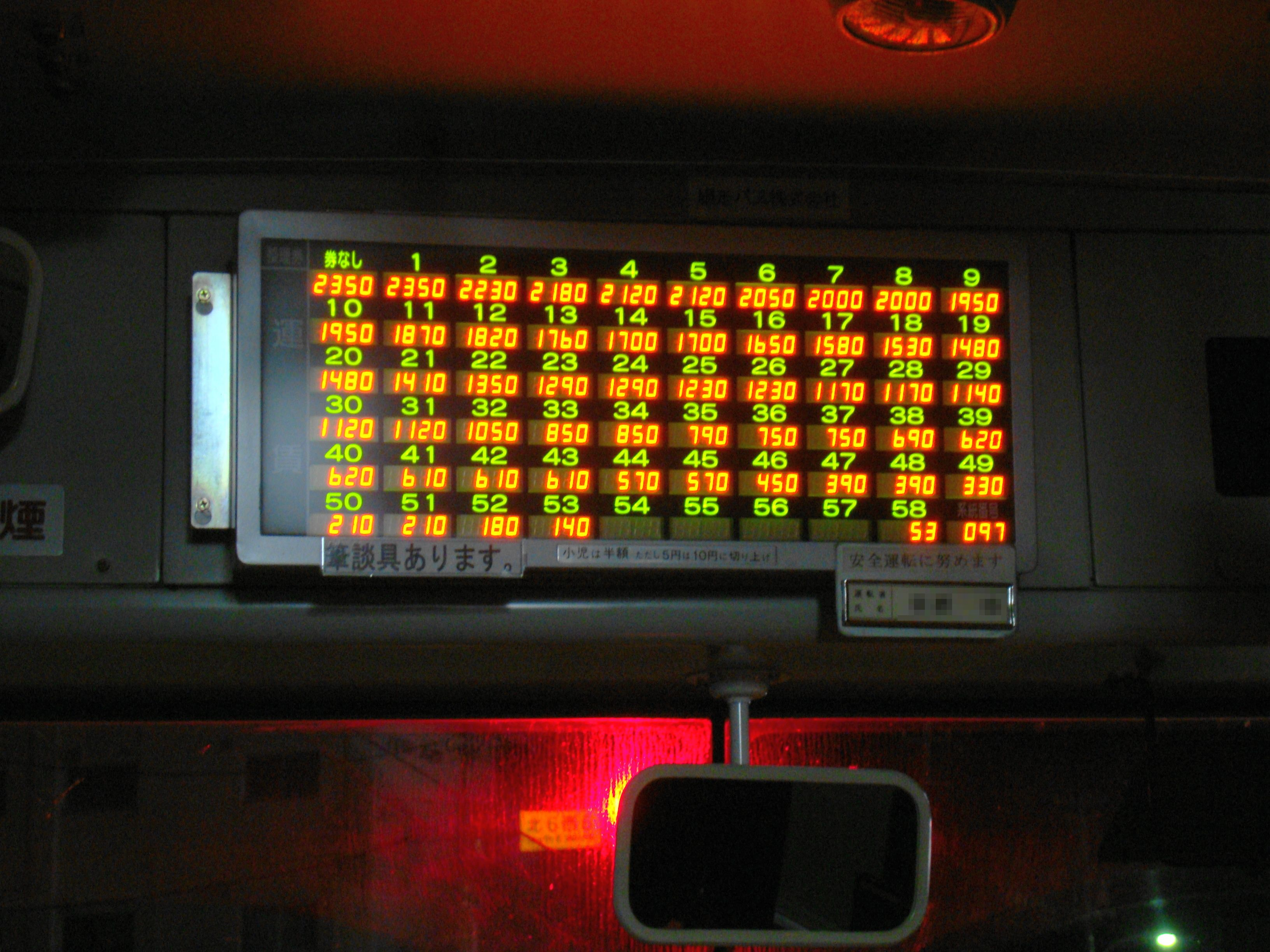
A LED fare chart on a bus. The fare to be paid corresponds to the number on the boarding voucher.

=== New Zealand ===
By 1997, more than 90 percent of all trains – both passenger and freight – operated by the then main freight and passenger rail operator in New Zealand, Tranz Rail, had only one person in the loco cab.

=== Sweden ===
In general all passenger trains on railways in Sweden have a driver and at least one conductor on board by rules, even it is not entirely mandatory.

In Sweden around two daily departures on the Swedish part of the Oresundtrain system operated by Veolia Transport is one-person operated. This practice is however only utilized when there is an abrupt shortage of train managers. In 2013 the company's health and safety representative – who (in Sweden) is a train driver appointed by a trade union – deemed it to be an unsafe practice demanding it be stopped. An important safety check done mainly by the conductor is to check that all doors get closed without any passenger stuck in any. This is hard to check in long trains, and long trains usually have at least two conductors.

Trams and metro trains are however in general one-person operated. Freight trains are in general also one-person operated.

=== Spain ===
The Barcelona Metro, Bilbao Metro, and Madrid Metro systems are all driver-only operated.

=== United Kingdom ===
On the British railway network, around 30% of all passenger services are single crewed or 'driver-only operated' (DOO). The remaining 70% employ approximately 6,800 guards. The term 'guard' is the common name used for the role which in most countries is referred to as a 'conductor'; it's also the name used in the railway's rule book. Many train companies use alternative names for the role (conductor, senior conductor, train manager), but the role is mostly the same regardless of operator. Since 1985, freight trains have steadily converted to one-person operation.

On the UK light railways and tramways, conductors have all but disappeared in an operational sense and now the term 'conductor' is commonly used for revenue and customer service staff. Historically 'operational' conductors were the 'norm' on all systems including the London Underground (who used the term 'guard' like the mainline railway). With exception to the Blackpool system, London Underground and Glasgow Subway – all current UK light rail systems are of modern construction and were built as 'new' for one-person operation.

British buses also once had operational conductors on most services, most buses were front-engined, meaning the passenger saloon door had to be behind the driver's cab. The last buses to have a conductor were in London on AEC Routemaster double-deck buses (primarily withdrawn in 2005), otherwise, all UK buses are one-person operated.

==== London ====
All trains on the London Underground are single-person operated. Conversion to one-person operation began in 1984 and was completed in 2000.

TFL now operates 100% of its London Overground network as driver-only trains. The latest conversion was announced in July 2013 on the Gospel Oak to Barking line. The National Union of Rail, Maritime and Transport Workers (RMT) challenged the move, claiming passenger safety would be compromised. Transport for London replied that at the time the East London line, already one-person operated, has one door-related incident for every seven million passengers, while the section of the network which currently uses conductors has one door-related incident for every four million passengers. On 16 August 2013, the RMT called a 48-hour strike over the August bank holiday weekend.

According to the RMT, the proposal set forth by Transport for London would imply driver-only operations on the whole of the London Overground network and make 130 guards redundant. London Overground Rail Operations stated in response that they had given "the RMT assurances on employing conductors in alternative customer service roles and offering a generous voluntary redundancy package to those who want it." According to RMT, the proposals to implement driver-only operations are in response to the 12.5% reduction in Transport for London's funding announced in Chancellor of the Exchequer George Osborne's Comprehensive Spending Review.

==== England and Wales ====
By 21 July 2010, Sir Roy McNulty, chair of the major value for money inquiry of the rail industry in the United Kingdom, tabled a scoping report titled Realising the potential of GB rail commissioned by the Department of Transport (DfT) and the Office of Rail Regulation (ORR). The report recommended that "the default position for all services on the GB rail network should be DOO (driver-only operation), with a second member of train-crew only being provided where there is a commercial, technical or other imperative", in order to reach the overall industry goal of a "30% unit cost reduction" by around 2018. The RMT stated that "any proposed extensions of DOO would be fought by the union on grounds of safety and efficiency".

The British government has proposed the extension of driver-only trains as a part of the new Northern franchise and has left it optional to the new operators of the Trans Pennine franchise. Additionally it has been proposed for the new Hitachi Super Express Trains which will be in use on the East Coast and Great Western franchises.

In April 2016, drivers belonging to the ASLEF trade union refused to pick up passengers using DOO on the new Class 387 trains on the Gatwick Express route. This is the system currently used for the 10-car Class 442 used on Gatwick Express, but the union claimed that extending this to 12-car trains put too much pressure on the driver and was unsafe. The operators Govia Thameslink Railway took legal action, and the union ultimately dropped the claim.

In the summer of 2016, guards working for Southern and belonging to the RMT trade union went on strike over plans to introduce DOO on more Southern services.

==== Scotland ====
DCO was first implemented in the 1980s, and currently more than 56% of ScotRail's trains are one-person operated, mainly electric services around the Glasgow and Strathclyde regions.

When First ScotRail launched a plan to implement one-person operations on the newly opened Airdrie-Bathgate Rail Link in 2010, the National Union of Rail, Maritime and Transport Workers (RMT) staged several strikes, claiming that the system was unsafe. ScotRail replied that they had been using one-person operated trains since the 1980s, and that the Class 334 trains planned for the Airdrie-Bathgate line had not even been delivered with a conductor's door panel. The strikes were ultimately ended by the unions, in part because of disagreements within the RMT about which principal stand to take on one-person operations. Other sources point to a "strike breaker" clause in ScotRail's contract, which enabled ScotRail to draw compensation from Scottish taxpayers during a strike, as another factor in the union's ending of the strikes. Even though the trains are now driven without a guard, a ticket inspector is still present on every train, although the ticket inspectors are paid less than guards. The RMT Union called strike action in Summer 2016 when New Franchisee Abellio ScotRail announced plans to extend driver-only operation. The dispute was resolved when ScotRail agreed that a conductor would be kept on all new trains with the driver opening the doors and the conductor shutting them.

==== Current driver-only / one-person operations ====
===== Metro systems =====
- London Underground – Has operated entirely driver-only or one-person operated services since 2000. Certain Underground trains (on the Jubilee, Central, Victoria and Northern lines) are driven automatically with a 'train operator' to carry out other duties such as door operation.
- Glasgow Subway – Operates an entirely driver-only operated service and has done since the Modernisation in 1977–1980.
- Tyne & Wear Metro – Has been entirely driver-only operated since it opened in 1980.
- Trams – Most tram systems in the UK are one-person operated, including: London Tramlink, West Midlands Metro, Nottingham Express Transit, Manchester Metrolink and Blackpool Tramway. Sheffield Supertram and Edinburgh Trams are DCO as they employ conductors, but do not assist with the doors or any operational roles. Many systems employ some form of ticket examiner for revenue and customer service reasons.
- Docklands Light Railway – operates automatically and every DLR train has a Passenger Service Agent (PSA) on board when it is in service. He has the role of a conductor, but also has the ability to take manual control of the train.
- Bus – All bus services in the United Kingdom are one-person operated. The last regular bus services were London Buses routes 9, 10, 11, 24, 38 and 390 operated by New Routemasters that had their conductors removed in 2016. London heritage route 15 that was operated by AEC Routemasters was the last bus route to have conductors until it was withdrawn in 2020.

===== National Rail =====
- Abellio Greater Anglia – All trains operating out of Liverpool Street are driver-only operated as far north as Colchester with the exception of Norwich services, which are DCO. Formally, trains operated by 'locomotive hauled' rolling stock required the presence of a guard/conductor.
- c2c – Operates an entirely driver-only operated train service.
- Chiltern Railways – Services operating to Aylesbury Vale Parkway and south of Banbury are driver-only operated with the exception of 'locomotive hauled' services.
- Great Western Railway – Most 'Networker' Class 165 and 166 and 'Electrostar' British Rail Class 387 operated services are driver-only trains, operating mostly in the Thames Valley from London Paddington to Bedwyn, Banbury and Oxford. For operational reasons, Networker services to Basingstoke, Gatwick Airport and services west of Oxford towards Worcester via the Cotswolds are operated with a guard/conductor.
- Govia Thameslink Railway – Operates an entirely driver-only operated train service on the Thameslink and Great Northern sub-brands.
- Heathrow Express – Operates an entirely DCO service; they do provide a 'customer service representative' on board for revenue and customer service duties.
- London Overground – Has operated an entirely driver-only operated service since July 2013.
- Lumo is an open-access operator on the East Coast and West Coast Main Lines. It has used DCO since launch.
- ScotRail – Most electric train services in the Strathclyde area are either driver-only or driver-controlled operation, as some services maintain a ticket examiner for revenue and customer service duties.
- Southeastern – Operate a large network of driver-only trains on their Metro services, mainly around South-East London. The HS1 services are DCO as they have an 'on board manager' for mainly revenue and customer service duties. Mainline Services from Kent are also DCO when operating within London.
- Southern – Operates driver-only trains in South London and on the Brighton Main Line. After disputes with both the RMT and ASLEF unions over the extension of driver-only trains across the rest of the network, ASLEF Drivers accepted a deal on 8 November 2017, resulting in the implementation of Driver Controlled Operation throughout the rest of the network which was not previously operating DOO services, excluding routes to Milton Keynes Central, Uckfield and Ashford International to Eastbourne.

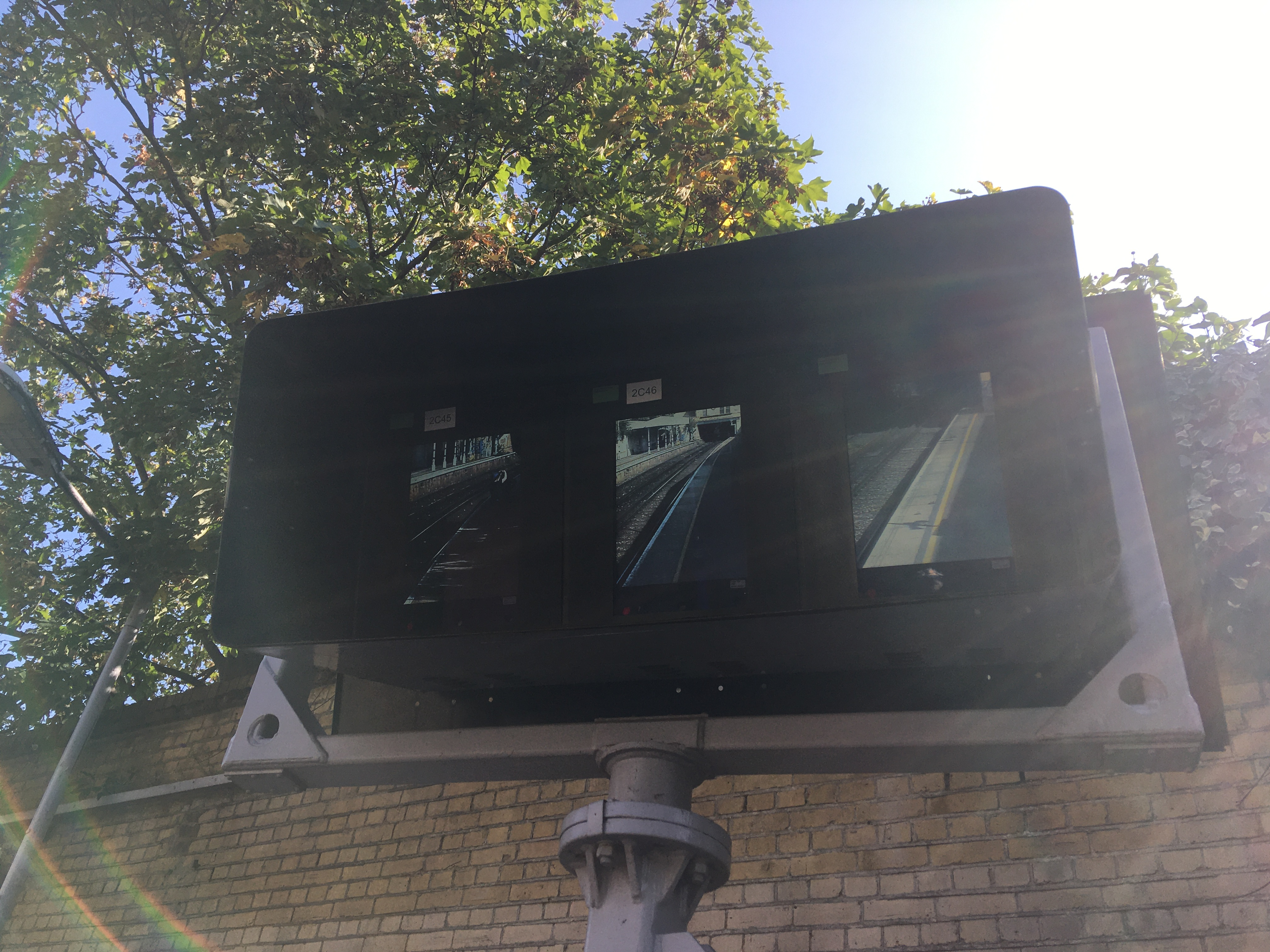
Driver Dispatch Screens at Clock House, used for closing the doors

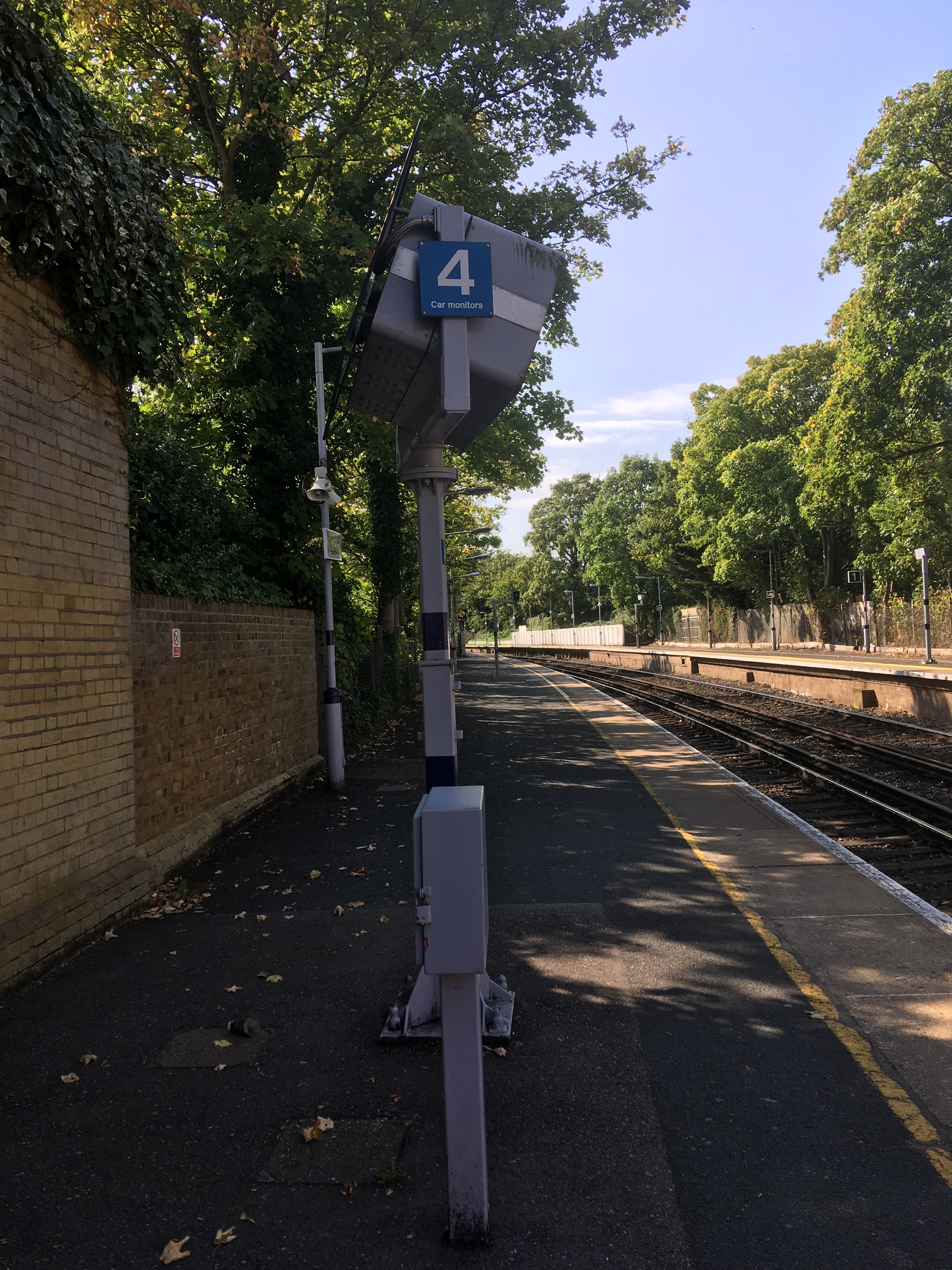
Driver Dispatch Screen side view

==== Safety ====
The UK rail safety regulator, the Rail Safety and Standards Board (RSSB), has stated that its research found no increased risks from driver-only operation.

We have 30 years of data which we have analysed. We have found that the driver performing the task does not increase the risk to passengers at all.

We have published several research projects over the last 15 years on various aspects of DOO on passenger trains. None of these pieces of work has identified any increased risk from dispatching a train without a guard being present – providing the correct procedures have been followed. In fact, the removal of any possible miscommunication, which could exist between driver and guard could, potentially, deliver some safety benefits. If we had found evidence to suggest that DOO was not safe when done correctly, we would say so.

In December 2016, the overall rail regulator, the Office of Rail and Road (ORR) responded by letter to the Transport Select Committee's enquiry into rail safety. In their related press release an ORR spokesman said:

Trains with doors operated by drivers (known in the industry as 'Driver Only Operation') have been in operation in Great Britain for more than 30 years. ORR has scrutinised this approach, and our inspectors are satisfied that with suitable equipment, proper procedures and competent staff in place, it is a safe method of working.

The RMT union disputes the independence of both the RSSB because of the involvement of train operating company representatives on its board. and says that both RSSB and ORR are disregarding wider safety issues by one-person working beyond the operation of the doors.

==== Access ====
Disabled passengers view the introduction of DDO as a major step backwards in accessibility because of the combination of several issues, which conflict with the government's stated intent of allowing 'turn-up-and-go' service for disabled people right across the network. Many UK railway stations are unstaffed and so boarding or disembarking assistance for a disabled person can be provided only by the train crew, and level access between platform and train is extremely rare. If there is no guard to put the onboard wheelchair ramp in place or otherwise assist the disabled person in boarding/debarking, access cannot be provided short of the driver leaving the cab. The Department for Transport's own Disabled Persons Transport Advisory Committee described DOO and unstaffed stations as a "toxic combination" that potentially breaches the government's obligations under the Equality Act 2010.

=== United States ===
==== Atlanta ====
Both the MARTA and the Atlanta Streetcar are DOO systems.

==== Baltimore ====
All light rail lines and the subway line operate on single-person operation.

==== Boston ====
On the Boston subway, also referred to as "The T", all three subway lines became completely one-person operated at the end of March 2012. This marked the ending of the gradual implementation of one-person operations that started in 1996 with parts of the subway's shortest line, the Blue Line, continued with the Orange Line in 2010 and ended with the longest line, the Red Line in 2012. The Green Line is also DOO, but uses one crewmember per car; a typical train has two cars and thus requires two crewmembers. According to Massachusetts Bay Transportation Authority spokesperson Joe Pesaturo, the Carmen's Union "has never embraced" one-person operation.

==== Bay Area ====
The Bay Area Rapid Transit is entirely DOO.

==== Chicago ====
In Chicago the city's main rapid transit system – the L – has been using one-person operation on the Yellow Line since its opening in 1964. On 31 October 1993, the Orange Line began operating DOO trains as well, which gradually spread to the entire network. As of 1998, the whole system runs with only a single crew member per train.

==== Cleveland ====
Cleveland's only heavy rail metro line, the Red Line (RTA Rapid Transit), is operated using DOO.

==== Light rail ====
All US light rail systems are driver-only operated.

==== Los Angeles ====
In Los Angeles, the city's rapid transit system (known as the Metro) has been using one-person operation on all of its transit lines since it began operating in 1991.

==== Miami ====
The Miami-Dade County Metrorail is DOO operated.

==== New York City ====
In the New York City area, the subway trains over 300 feet (91 m) and with over five cars are operated by a two-person crew of a motorman and a conductor. On 1 September 1997, OPTO began on the Franklin Avenue Shuttle and Rockaway Park Shuttle during all times, and on the B-West End Shuttle and 5-Dyre Avenue Shuttle during late nights.

The following New York City Subway services and rolling stock are used for one-person operation as of July 2018:

===== Full-time one-person operation =====
- Franklin Avenue Shuttle (R68): 2 cars
- Rockaway Park Shuttle (R46): 4 cars (except summer weekends when extended trains operate)

===== Part-time one-person operation =====
- 5 train (Dyre Avenue and East 180th Street) during late nights (R142): 5 cars
- A train on the Ozone Park–Lefferts Boulevard branch during late nights (R46): 4 cars
- G weekends (R160) : 5 cars
- M weekends (R160): 4 cars

==== Philadelphia Area ====
- PATCO Speedline has also had one-person OPTO operation from its opening in 1969.
- SEPTA's Broad Street Subway, Market-Frankford Subway-Elevated, Media & Sharon Hill Light Rail and Norristown High-Speed Lines are all OPTO.

==== Washington, D.C. ====
The Washington Metro has always operated under the "one man rule" from the opening of the first line in 1976. In addition to the DC Streetcar.

== Freight trains ==
=== Canada ===
Most freight trains in Canada do not permit one-person train operation due to safety concerns.

The Quebec North Shore and Labrador Railway is the only railway in Canada approved by Transport Canada to run one-person freight trains.

Following the Lac-Mégantic derailment in July 2013, when a one-person operated Montreal, Maine and Atlantic Railway (MMA) train was involved in a major and fatal accident, the Canadian Government issued an emergency order banning one-person freight trains carrying hazardous cargo. The MMA went bankrupt shortly after that.

=== Denmark ===
Danish freight trains are usually one-person operated.

=== Ireland ===
Irish freight trains operated by locomotives of the 201 Class are one-person operated, however most freight trains of the 071 Class are operated by two engineers.

=== Sweden ===
Swedish freight trains are usually one-person operated.

=== United Kingdom ===
Most British freight trains are one-person or driver-only-operated, but certain freight trains have guards on board for operational or safety reasons (such as DRS nuclear trains).

=== United States ===
According to the Federal Railroad Administration, one-person operated freight trains are "very rare" in the United States because it is hard to comply with federal safety regulations with only one person on the train.

In the wake of the Lac-Mégantic derailment in July 2013, Federal Railroad Administrator Joseph C. Szabo demanded that Montreal, Maine and Atlantic Railway start using two-person train crews in the US. The US has however not issued a ban on one-person-operated freight trains. In July 2013, the 55,000-member Canadian and American Brotherhood of Locomotive Engineers and Trainmen stated that they had been opposed to one-person freight trains for safety reasons since the introduction of the idea approximately a decade ago. In November 2019, eight U.S. railroads filed a federal lawsuit against the union to allow for the implementation of one-person crews.

== Buses ==
Some public bus companies also introduced one-man operation as cost saving measures, predominantly in China, South Korea, Japan, Taiwan, Hong Kong, Macau, Singapore, etc.
