= London Underground A Stock (District Railway) =

1903 prototype rolling stock

A Stock
- In service: 1903-1925
- Manufacturer: Brush
- Constructed: 1903

Specifications
- Car length: 50 ft 6 in (15.39 m)
- Width: 8 ft 10 in (2.692 m)
- Height: 12 ft 3 in (3.734 m)

The A Stock cars were built for the District Railway by Brush Traction in 1903. They were the prototype electric units tested by the District Railway.

== History ==
Two seven car, wooden bodied, trains were built by Brush at Loughborough in 1903. Both trains consisted of driving motor cars at either end, a driving motor car centrally placed with four trailer cars elsewhere in the formation. Trains could be split into shorter consists, dependent on the location of the central driving motor. The outer driving motors had a luggage compartment at the driving end behind the driving compartment, and gates for passenger access at the inner end. The centre motor cars had gates at either end and equipment enabling them to be driven from either end and operate as a single vehicle. In addition to the end gates, all cars had centrally located hand operated passenger doors. Each train had differing control and braking systems to compare these systems in service. Later, some trailer cars were equipped with driving controls in a half-cab at one end enabling shorter trains to be operated. These trains were later fitted with Ward couplings, the first to be thus equipped.

== Operation ==
Originally operating between Mill Hill Park (later renamed Acton Town) and South Harrow, and from 1905 also working between South Acton and Hounslow. The South Harrow shuttle was extended to Uxbridge in 1910.

== Fate ==
The last car was withdrawn in 1925 and no examples passed to the London Passenger Transport Board.

None survived into preservation.

== Fleet details ==
Car type	Original numbers	1910 numbers
DM end	1-4	1-4
DM middle	201-202	130-131
T	301-308	301-308
