= List of Great Central Railway locomotives and rolling stock =

This is a list of locomotives and rolling stock based at the preserved Great Central Railway at Loughborough in Leicestershire, the Great Central Railway (Nottingham) at Ruddington in Nottinghamshire, and the Mountsorrel Railway near Leicester.

== Mainline steam locomotives ==
The Great Central has a varied fleet of steam classes representing each of the United Kingdom's "Big Four" railway companies and British Rail. Some of them once worked along the original routes, and others were part of classes that saw service there.

=== Operational ===
| Number and name | Type | Builder | Photograph | Livery | History | Owner | Notes |
|---|---|---|---|---|---|---|---|
| No. 6990 "Witherslack Hall" | GWR 6959 Class 4-6-0 | Swindon Works | | BR Lined Green, Early Emblem | Built in 1948. 6990 was selected as a post-nationalisation locomotive to participate in the Locomotive Exchanges of 1948 on the former Great Central Main Line. Following the trials, it was based at Old Oak Common TMD (81A) until 1966 and was then sold to Woodham Brothers Ltd. It was purchased for preservation and returned to the Great Central in 1975. The locomotive returned to service following its second 10-year overhaul in preservation in October 2015. During its last overhaul, Witherslack Hall's Collett tender was exchanged with 4930 Hagley Hall's former Hawksworth tender. Failed with boiler problems in 2022, the loco was withdrawn from service early so it could be repaired and returned to service with a new boiler ticket. Returned to service in August 2023, In 2026 withdrawn for boiler retubing, ticket extension till 2030. | David Clarke Railway Trust. | |
| No. 73156 | BR Standard Class 5 4-6-0 | Doncaster Works | | BR Lined Black, Late Crest | Built in 1956. 73156 is the last survivor of all Doncaster-built BR standards. Allocated to Neasden depot (34E), from where it would regularly work on the ex-Great Central line. After several spells at sheds on the London Midland Region, it was withdrawn in 1967. When rescued from Barry and taken to the East Lancashire Railway, most minor parts had already been sold, but many new ones were purchased and fitted by 2003, when it was transferred to the Great Central to continue restoration. A new BR1B tender has been built to replace the original. The locomotive returned to service in September 2017, but was stopped shortly afterwards requiring repairs to its bottom end. These repairs were completed in time for the locomotive to make its second debut into traffic for the Goods Galore gala in May 2018. Boiler ticket expires in 2027. | 73156 Standard 5 Support Group. | |
| No. 78018 | BR Standard Class 2 2-6-0 | Darlington Works | | BR Lined Black, Late Crest | Built in 1953. 78018 entered traffic on 3 March 1954, at West Auckland Shed (County Durham). It was then transferred to Chester Midland in April 1960; Workington in 1962; Willesden in May 1963; Nuneaton in September 1965 and finally Shrewsbury before withdrawal on 12 November 1966. 78018 then spent 11 years at Barry scrapyard before being preserved at Shackerstone in November 1978. 78018 became famous for getting stuck in a snow drift during February 1955, which resulted in the film Snowdrift at Bleath Gill. This locomotive is now owned by the Darlington Railway Preservation Society and arrived at the GCR in November 2012 for the completion of its overhaul. An agreement is in place for the locomotive to become a resident at the GCR for the next 10 years. The restoration was completed in October 2016, in time for the locomotive to star in the autumn steam gala. Boiler ticket expires in 2026. | Darlington Railway Preservation Society. | |
| No. 78019 | BR Standard Class 2 2-6-0 | Darlington Works | | BR Black, Late Crest | Built in 1954. 78019 was allocated to Kirkby Stephen (51H), working on local and banking duties through the Lake District. After turns to Willesden (1A), Nuneaton (2B) and Crewe South (5B) it was withdrawn in 1966 and sold to Barry Scrapyard, being moved there the next year. In 1973 it was moved to the Severn Valley Railway, but restoration was never carried out there due to more pressing projects. The locomotive was moved to the Great Central where its major restoration was completed in 2004. Following expiry of the engines boiler ticket in May 2015 the engine was withdrawn for overhaul which was completed in Oct 2022. Boiler ticket expires in 2032. | | |

=== Non operational ===
==== Under overhaul/construction ====
| Number & Name | Type | Builder | Photograph | Livery | History | Owner | Notes |
|---|---|---|---|---|---|---|---|
| No. 567 | GCR Class 2 4-4-0 | N/A | | N/A | Under Construction. The Class 2s were a series of express locomotives built between 1887 and 1892 for use on the MSLR. When the LNER formed they became the D7s, by then they were already obsolete, and all were withdrawn between 1926 and 1939, with no preserved examples. in 2011, a project was launched to build a new member of the class to modern engineering standards for running on the Great Central Railway. No 567 is new build locomotive, with cylinder block and tender chassis already purchased. The total project budget of £450,000 is projected. | LNER D7 Project | |
| No. 63601 | GCR Class 8K 2-8-0 | Gorton locomotive works | | BR Unlined Black, Early Emblem | Built in 1912. Following completion 63601 was based at Doncaster (36A), primarily hauling slow goods on former Great Central metals. It was withdrawn from service in 1966, as a veteran of two World Wars and three rail companies, but the role the O4s played in the early 20th century caused it to become custodian of the National Collection. An appeal was raised by Steam Railway to return it to steam, which was completed at Loughborough in 2000 and it became a regular and popular performer. Boiler ticket expired in late 2010, but its ticket was extended for another two years before it was withdrawn from service on 24 June 2012 when the extension expired. The overhaul began in 2019. | National Railway Museum. | |
| No. 1631 | USATC S160 Class 2-8-0 | American Locomotive Company | | N/A | Built in 1942. 1631 was one of more than 2000 identical locomotives built for use in Europe during World War II. After the war it was retained for service in Hungary as number 411.388, withdrawn in the 1980s and converted into a static generator before being taken to England in 1995 for storage on the East Lancashire Railway. The locomotive changed hands twice before being moved to Ruddington in 2004. A large collection of parts from two other locomotives are also stored as a source of spares, and restoration is underway. it is currently for sale. | Private Owner | |
| No. 7027 "Thornbury Castle" | GWR 4-6-0 GWR 4073 'Castle' 4-6-0 | Swindon Works | | BR Green, TBC (On Completion) | Built in 1949. 7027's first shed allocation was Plymouth Laira. In March 1959 the engine was re-allocated to Old Oak Common, this being the GWR's biggest shed and for 7027 it would spend most of its working career at 81A before being re-allocated in April 1960 to Worcester. 7027's final shed allocation in August 1963 was at Reading and the engine was withdrawn 4 months later in December 1963 before being moved to Woodham Brothers scrapyard in Barry, South Wales. Arriving there in May 1964. In August 1972 no 7027 was sold to the then Birmingham Railway Museum and left as the 23rd departure from Barry scrapyard. The engine was however never restored to working order and numerous parts were taken from the engine for use on fellow Tyseley based classmates No. 7029 "Clun Castle" and 5043 "Earl of Mount Edgcumbe". After being purchased by Pete Waterman's Transport Trust, it was stored outside the Crewe Heritage Centre still in its Barry Scrapyard condition. Following the removal of Waterman's railway equipment from the former LNWR site in 2016, it was moved to Peak Rail in April 2016. It was later sold on to Jon Jones-Pratt who planned to restore the engine to modern mainline standards. Owing to commitments elsewhere little progress was made on 7027's restoration and in January 2020 it was once again purchased by another individual with plans to restore the engine to working order, moving to Loughborough where the restoration is well underway. 7027 will however not be restored for mainline operation. | Private Owner | |
| No. 30777 Sir Lamiel | LSWR N15 class 4-6-0 | North British Locomotive Company | | BR Lined Green, Early Emblem (on completion) | Built in 1925. 777 was built by the North British Locomotive Company of Glasgow as one of the later batches of N15s, which became known as "Scotch Arthurs". Based mostly in service at Nine Elms (70A). After the war, it moved to Eastleigh Works (71A), but the Southern Region's electrification policy caused withdrawal in 1959. The NRM had earmarked it for preservation before then and in 1978, it returned to steam, after an extensive overhaul at Hull, Dairycoates (53A). A third overhaul, completed in 2006, has allowed for further operations on the national network. It failed in August 2017 following leaking boiler tubes. Overhaul began in 2020. The engines overhaul is being done to Network Rail standards as it is intended for the engine to once again run on the mainline on completion of its overhaul. | National Railway Museum. | Cared for by the 5305 Locomotive Association. |
| No. 34039 "Boscastle" | SR West Country Class 4-6-2 | Brighton Works | | BR Green, Late Crest (On Completion) | Built in 1946. 34039 was based at Stewarts Lane TMD (73A). It was rebuilt at Eastleigh for use in Bournemouth (71B), and was withdrawn from service in 1965. It became the first motive power at Loughborough in 1973. Restoration was not completed until 1992, with many issues causing withdrawal in 2000. A group was formed in 2005 which is now working to return it to working order with a £200,000 overhaul programme. The boiler is off site, and the locomotive has been re-wheeled. | Boscastle Locomotive Limited. | |
| No. 45491 | LMS Stanier Class 5 4-6-0 | Derby Works | | BR Black, TBC (On Completion) | Built in 1943. Presently undergoing restoration from Barry Scrapyard condition. The engine's tender has already been completed, with most of the work now concentrated on the boiler, which was removed from the frames in Easter 2012. | Private Owner | |
| No. 46521 | LMS Ivatt Class 2 2-6-0 | Swindon Works | | BR Lined Green, Early Emblem | Built in 1953. 46521 was built at Swindon Works as part of a batch of Western Region Ivatt Class 2s. Because of this, it was based at ex-Great Western depots, including Oswestry (89A) and Machynlleth (89C), but was withdrawn from service in 1966 and was sent to Barry scrapyard during 1967. Its first home in preservation was at the Severn Valley Railway from 1971, restored at Bridgnorth in 1974. After several years of work, a complete rebuild including the fitting of off-road tyres was finished at Loughborough in late 2011. After four years sporting Unlined BR Black livery, 46521 was repainted into Lined BR Green in May 2016. Boiler ticket expired in November 2022. | Loughborough Standard Locomotive Group. | |
| No. 48624 | LMS Stanier Class 8F 2-8-0 | Ashford Works | | BR Unlined Black, Early Emblem | Built in 1943. Restored at Peak Rail in 2009. After nearly 30 years of work, it was repainted into an LMS maroon livery (only ever worn authentically by express-passenger classes of the company). It ran at the railway for about a year, and was then put on loan to other lines, before being based at the Great Central from early 2011. Boiler ticket expired on 31 July 2019 and is undergoing overhaul. | 48624 Locomotive Company. | |
| No. 70013 "Oliver Cromwell" | BR Standard Class 7 4-6-2 | Crewe Works | | BR Lined Green, Late Crest (On Completion) | Built in 1951. 70013 was allocated to the Eastern Region of British Railways on completion with its shed being Norwich (32A) until transfer to the LMR. Thanks to an overhaul undertaken at Crewe, it was the only member of the class operational in 1968 and was selected to haul the Fifteen Guinea Special at the end of steam. The importance of the train meant that it would join the National Collection, and in 2004 was moved to GCR for restoration to celebrate 40 years of the 1T57. Boiler ticket expired in December 2018 and an overhaul began shortly afterwards. The engines overhaul is being done to Network Rail standards as it is intended for the engine to once again run on the mainline on completion of its overhaul. | National Railway Museum. | Cared for by the 5305 Locomotive Association. |
| No. 47406 | LMS Fowler Class 3F 0-6-0T | Vulcan Foundry | | BR Unlined Black, Early Emblem | Built in 1926. First based at Warrington (8B) and Crewe South (5B). In 1928, it started a long period of work at Carnforth (11A), which lasted for 32 years. From 1960, many more allocations were made, ending at Edge Hill (8A) in 1967. Delivered to Woodham Brothers in the summer of 1968, all mechanical parts had been sold by the time it was rescued by the Rowsley Locomotive Trust in 1983. In 1989, owner Roger Hibbert took it to Loughborough, where restoration was completed in early 2010. Boiler ticket expired in April 2020 after it was granted an extension. After this it was displayed in the museum building at Mountsorrel before being removed in 2023 to commence overhaul at Locomotive Maintenance Services, Loughborough. | Private owner. | |

==== Stored ====
| Number & Name | Type | Builder | Photograph | Livery | History | Owner | Notes |
|---|---|---|---|---|---|---|---|
| No. 45305 "Alderman A.E.Draper" | LMS Stanier Class 5 4-6-0 | Armstrong Whitworth | | BR Lined Black, Late Crest | Built in 1937. 5305 was allocated to several depots before becoming based at Lostock Hall (10D) by 1968, one of only three steam sheds left at the end of BR steam. Withdrawn at the very end on 4 August 1968, it was sold to Draper's Scrapyard, before being saved for restoration. In preservation, it has continued the Five's 'Ubiquity' by working across Britain, even going up into the Highlands in the 1980s. Since 1996, it has been based at Loughborough, however its boiler ticket expired in October 2021. | 5305 Locomotive Association. | |
| No. 48305 | LMS Stanier Class 8F 2-8-0 | Crewe Works | | BR Black, Early Emblem | Built in 1943. 48305 was based for much of its career at Cricklewood (14A), operating across the Midlands. After moving between other sheds, including Crewe South (5B) and Speke Junction (8C), it was withdrawn in 1968, just before the end of steam. During the time spent at Barry it was sprayed with the words "Please don't let me die!" on the smokebox door, but was saved by Roger Hibbert in 1985 and was restored to steam in the next 10 years. In 2011, halfway through its boiler ticket the decision was taken to perform another major overhaul, which was completed in 2019. It was withdrawn from service in 2025 due to a cracked firebox. | Private Owner | |
| No. 92214 | BR Standard Class 9F 2-10-0 | Swindon Works | | BR black, Late Crest | Built in 1959. 92214 was built by Swindon Works and allocated to Cardiff Canton (86C) upon entering service. Upon withdrawal from Severn Tunnel Junction (86E) in 1965, it was sold to Barry Scrapyard. In 1980, it was moved to the Midland Railway Centre and restored to full working order. In 2010, the locomotive was sold to the North Yorkshire Moors Railway, where it was named Cock o' the North in 2011. Originally arriving at the GCR to attend the winter steam gala in 2014, an agreement was made between its owners and the Director of the GCR which saw 92214 become part of the GCR fleet permanently. Acquired by the David Clarke Railway Trust in January 2023. Withdrawn from service in February 2024. | David Clarke Railway Trust | |

== Industrial locomotives ==
=== Industrial steam locomotives ===
Industrial steam locomotives became the mainstay of steam power in early British railway preservation before the Barry Scrapyard veterans were fully restored. Many have huge traction efforts despite their small sizes, making them more than capable of hauling large passenger trains.

==== Operational ====
| Number & Name | Type | Builder | Photograph | Livery | History | Owner | Notes |
|---|---|---|---|---|---|---|---|
| No. 1223 "Colin McAndrew" | Andrew Barclay 0-4-0ST | Andrew Barclay Sons & Co. | | Colin McAndrew Ltd Lined Green | Built in 1911 and worked at Retford Military Barracks in Edinburgh until 1915, when it was sold to Tharsis Sulphur and Copper Works in Henburn-Upon-Tyne. In 1939 it was sold again to N. Greening (Wireworks) in Warrington. In 1966 it was sold into preservation, moving to the Chasewater Railway in 1968, where it had been based for all of its preservation life. In 2009 it was returned to service after a major rebuild and remained in service until withdrawal in 2017. In 2020 the locomotive was overhauled at Locomotive Maintenance Services at Loughborough and, following a brief spell back at Chasewater, the locomotive was sold and moved to Mountsorrel in October 2020. Boiler ticket expires in 2030. | Mountsorrel and Rothley Community Heritage. | |
| No. 7 "Robert"(Currently In Guise of 68067) | Austerity 0-6-0ST | Hudswell Clarke | | BR Unlined Black, Early Emblem | Built in 1953. Robert was built by Hudswell Clarke Engine Company due to manufacturing constraints at Hunslet. After construction it was delivered to the National Coal Board to work in Scotland. After continuing work for several years, it became one of the participants of the Rocket 150 Rainhill Trials re-enactment in 1980. Following the celebrations it was kept at private sites in store, until moving to Quorn & Woodhouse in 2008. Moved from the siding to the locomotive shed in 2010 after the completion of 47406. Entered service in early 2018 following overhaul and now painted in BR Black with fictitious number of 68067. Spent 2019 operating at Ruddington and has returned to Loughborough. | Private owner. | |

==== Under overhaul/restoration ====
| Number & Name | Type | Builder | Photograph | Livery | History | Owner | Notes |
|---|---|---|---|---|---|---|---|
| No. 1762 "Dolobran" | Manning Wardle 0-6-0ST | Manning Wardle | | N/A | Built in 1910. Dolobran was built by Manning Wardle as works number 1762. Worked at Stewarts & Lloyds at Corby before the delivery of RSH 0-6-0 saddle tanks in the 1950s. After withdrawal from service in 1968 was preserved in storage at the Kent and East Sussex Railway from 1972, and then at Woolwich before being moved to Peak Rail in Derbyshire in 2002, moving again to Ruddington in 2003 for restoration to working order. The frames are inside the main railway workshop under heavy general overhaul. | Private Owner. | |
| No. 2009 "Rhyl" | Manning Wardle 0-6-0ST | Manning Wardle | | N/A | Built in 1921. Rhyl was built by Manning Wardle as with sister No 1762 Dolobran, and like 1762 worked at Stewarts & Lloyds from construction until being withdrawn in 1968. In 2003 No 2009 was transported to Ruddington in partially dismantled state. In late 2010 work was proceeding on heavy general overhaul with work concentrated on axlebox and hornblock machining. | Private Owner. | |
| No. 1682 "Julia" | Hudswell Clarke 0-6-0ST | Hudswell Clarke | | British Sugar Corporation Kelham Notts Dark Blue. | Built in 1937. Julia was built by Hudswell Clarke to work at the BSC Kelham Foundry. When replaced by diesel traction next home was on static display in the Millgate Museum in Newark, Nottinghamshire. In 1991 became the first steam locomotive to be based at the newly formed Great Central Railway (Nottingham). Heavy General Overhaul commenced 2007. In 2010 the frames and boiler were moved into the workshop of Ruddington Locomotive Works. No target completion date has been set. Cab steel work now mostly complete trailing wheelset overhauled and refitted. | Private Owner. | |
| No. 3809 | Austerity 0-6-0ST | Hunslet Engine Company | | BR Lined Black, Late Crest | Built in 1953. 3809 was built for use with a National Coal Board firm in Scotland. After 33 years of industrial service it was purchased for preservation on the North Norfolk Railway and performed at the railway for the next until withdrawal for overhaul. That overhaul is being undertaken by owner David Wright at Loughborough, with the current work progressing at a good pace. The boiler is out of the frames and is having the stays removed, while the frames undergo repairs in the shed and the wheels also receive attention for completion in 2012. | Private Owner. | |
| No. 7684 "Nechells No. 4" | Robert Stephenson and Hawthorns 0-6-0T | Robert Stephenson and Hawthorns | | Lined Green | Built in 1951. Spent most of its working life at Nechells Power Station in Warwickshire, where it operated until 1972. Its first home was the Battlefield Line Railway in 1973 where it was restored in 1995. In 1996 it moved to the Foxfield Railway, where it remained in 2010 until moving on to the Chasewater Railway. It continued operating at Chasewater until its boiler ticket expires in 2015 and the locomotive was placed on static display. In October 2018 the locomotive was sold and moved to Loughborough, where its overhaul commenced soon after arrival. | Private owner | |

==== Stored ====
| Number & Name | Type | Builder | Photograph | Livery | History | Owner | Notes |
|---|---|---|---|---|---|---|---|
| Neepsend No. 2 | Sentinel; 4wVBT | Sentinel Waggon Works | | Maroon | Built in 1946. Neepsend No. 2 was a late entry into the Sentinel steam catalog. Working for the Central Electricity Generating Board, it worked at Neepsend Power Station throughout its entire working life. In 1974 it was due to be destroyed at a nearby scrapyard, but was saved and spent 18 months at the Great Central before being put on display in Swanwick museum at the Midland Railway Butterley in 1979. Now back at Loughborough since 2011 after a 35-year absence, work will start on its restoration when the owner's other locomotive, 45491 has been completed. | Private owner. | |
| 921 | Powesland and Mason 0-4-0ST | Brush Electrical Machines | | Lined Green | Built in 1906. Built by Brush and worked at Swansea Harbour until it was withdrawn in 1928. It was then sold to Berry Wiggins & Co Ltd in Kent. It operated there until 1964 and presented to the Leicester Museum of Technology in 1968. Most of its preservation years have been spent at Snibston from 1992 where it was one of the exhibits. Snibston sadly closed in 2018 and in May 2019, the locomotive was moved to Mountsorrel where it is on display in the museum building. | Leicestershire County Council. | |
| No. 5 "Arthur" | Manning Wardle 0-6-0ST No. 2015 | Boyne Engine Works | | Red | Built in 1921. Arthur was built at Boyne Engine Works, Jack Lane, Leeds. Supplied to the order of Cardiff Corporation, and at a later date transferred to the Longbridge works of Austin Motors, working there until the early 1960s. From there spent a number of years plinthed at Newdigate Street in Birmingham before transfer to Woolwich. Brought to Ruddington in 2003 with Dolobran and Rhyl, while the others arrived dismantled, 2015 was the only one to remain cosmetically complete. Now stored in the open, restoration will be tackled once other locomotives are finished. | Private Owner. | |

=== Industrial diesel shunters ===
In addition to the larger network shunters there is also a modest collection of old industrial designs in varying states of repair.

==== Operational ====
| Number & Name | Description | History & Current Status | Livery | Owner(s) | Date | Photograph |
|---|---|---|---|---|---|---|
Operational
| 393304 | Ruston & Hornsby 48DS; 0-4-0DM | This small shunter spent most of its preservation at the now closed Snibston Discovery Park. Prior to that, it worked at the Bardon Hill Quarry and passed into preservation at the Battlefield Line Railway. The locomotive moved to the Mountsorrel Branch in 2017 where it was commissioned for service and serves as the yard shunter for the branch. | Green | Leicester County Council. | 1956 | |
Undergoing overhaul, restoration or repairs
Stored or static
| D2959; Staythorpe | Ruston & Hornsby 165; 0-4-0DE | Staythorpe was built in Grantham and was bought by National Power for regular use as a mineral train shunter at Staythorpe Power Station in Nottinghamshire. It was taken off the hands of the station in early 1994 to assist with track-laying at Ruddington following the purchase of more resources for the heritage centre. After the completion of the project it has returned to service as a standard yard shunter and over the years has been in service in various liveries, including most recently with a fictional BR livery and number. It is now stored awaiting mechanical repairs. | BR Green with the Late Crest. | Private owner. | 1961 | ~ |
| No. D4279; Arthur Wright | John Fowler; 0-4-0DM | Arthur Wright was built for use at the East Midlands Gas Board. Its first area of work was at Carr House Works in Rotherham, before moving to Derby in the 1960s. Afterwards it was sold to Albert Looms in 1970 and worked for the company until 1974, and was sold into private hands. Arriving in early 1975, it was repainted and named after the late Arthur Wright, a director for the MLST. Following a period of operation, it was withdrawn from service and has resided in long-term storage at Swithland Sidings for some considerable time. | Dark blue. | Private owner. | 1952 | |

== Mainline diesel shunters ==
| | Description | History & Current Status | Livery | Owner(s) | Date | Photograph |
|---|---|---|---|---|---|---|
Operational
| 13101 | British Rail Class 08; 0-6-0DE | 13101 (later D3101) was built at Derby Works as one of a batch of 10 air-braked shunters which were also given an English Electric 6KT engine and was allocated to the Southern Region. Based primarily at Ashford (73F) & Eastleigh (71A), in 1973 it left the Southern for use at Loughborough Midland station and its local sidings. After withdrawal it was bought by a Great Central Railway volunteer and arrived at Loughborough in December 1984. In 2010 it returned to regular shunting duties after a long restoration and now performs as shed pilot for Loughborough Central. Funds were raised on the 2012 Autumn Steam gala for this loco to be repainted and this long-awaited task was carried out and completed in time for the September 2013 Diesel gala, the livery being BR green. | BR green with wasp stripes and the early crest. | Private owner. | 1955 | |
| No. 08114 | British Rail Class 08; 0-6-0DE | 08114 was built at Derby Works as no. D3180, allocated to nearby Derby (17A), working there on pilot shunting duties until withdrawal in 1983. After a narrow escape from the cutter's torch it was purchased for preservation and was transferred to the Gloucestershire Warwickshire Railway. Until 1997 it had also spent some time at the southern section of the Great Central Railway, before moving to the heritage complex at Ruddington, where it works on shunting duties in the yard, and at diesel galas also performs on shuttle passenger trains. The locomotive received a replacement radiator in 2018 and a repaint into BR Blue with wasp stripes was completed in 2020. On loan to the Epping Ongar Railway. | BR Rail Blue. | Private owner. | 1955 | |
| No. 08220 | British Rail Class 08; 0-6-0DE | 08220 was also built at Derby Works and operated primarily on the London Midland Region until withdrawal in the 1990s. After being taken out of service it was stored at Carnforth to provide a source of spares parts for sister engine 08678, but was only lightly stripped with most taken parts being internal mechanisms. Nonetheless, it was to eventually to be moved to a private site at a farm yard near Wrenbury for static display. It arrived at Ruddington for restoration in 2008, which has included a comprehensive replacement of all the removed equipment. Returned to Ruddington in 2019 following a few years away on loan. | BR Rail Blue. | English Electric Preservation. | 1956 | |
| No. D4137 | British Rail Class 08; 0-6-0DE | D4137 was built at Horwich Works in 1962 and saw spells at Burton, Leicester Midland and Holyhead. In the 1970s it was renumbered to 08907 and the final depot it operated from was Bescot TMD in the Midlands, painted in DB Red. The locomotive moved to Loughborough in November 2016 and was brought back into service following attention to its vacuum braking system. In April 2019 the locomotive was painted into BR Green with wasp stripes and renumbered to its original guise, D4137. | BR green with wasp stripes and the late crest. | Private owner. | 1962 | |
| No. 10119 Margaret Ethel-Thomas Alfred Naylor | British Rail Class 10; 0-6-0DE | D4067 was built at Darlington Works, fitted with a Lister Blackstone engine. It was based for its British Rail service career in South Yorkshire. However, in 1971 it was sold to the National Coal Board, which relocated it to Betteshanger Colliery in Kent, followed by three years spent at Nailstone from 1976. After that it was withdrawn completely from service and was purchased for private preservation at Loughborough. After several years of hard restoration work carried out its first train ran in 1986 was later named, after the parents of the owner. Featured in Top Gear. Now stationed at Rothley as the Carriage and Wagon Works shunter and was repainted in 2023 into NCB Kent Colliery Blue. | NCB Kent Colliery Blue with Wasp Stripes. | Private owner. | 1961 | |
Undergoing overhaul, restoration or repairs
| No. D2118 | British Rail Class 03; 0-6-0DM | Built at Swindon, D2118 was first based at Swansea (87A), to replace Great Western locomotives. Within less than a decade it moved to Barrow and was withdrawn in the 1970s due to mechanical failures. It was saved from scrap by contractors in Norfolk, but was out of work again by the 1980s. After being declared redundant a third time, it was preserved at Rutland Railway Museum and Peak Rail, where it was sold off in late 2010. The new owner moved the locomotive to Ruddington where restoration is taking place. | BR Rail Blue. | Private owner. | 1959 | ~ |
| No. 07005 | British Rail Class 07; 0-6-0DE | 07005 was built by the Ruston and Hornsby engine company as part of the 14-strong class of shunters. Its first home was at Eastleigh TMD (71A), working light-freight trains to and from Southampton Docks (71I). Retired in 1977 in favour of more-efficient classes, it left the area for a brief period of work in Middlesbrough, far cry from the Southern Region city port. After a lengthy amount of time spent in storage at Barrow Hill, it moved to the Battlefield Line Railway in 2002. It has since moved to the Great Central and spent a long time at Swithland sidings awaiting restoration. During summer 2012, 07005 was shunted out of Swithland sidings and moved to Loughborough Central were the restoration work will take place. This will include a full motor overhaul. This major overhaul has now returned to the railway, and is currently stored behind Loughborough MPD awaiting work to continue. | BR Rail Blue. | Private owner. | 1962 | |
Stored or static
| No. 08694 | British Rail Class 08; 0-6-0DE | 08694 was built at Horwich Works and was first allocated to Annesley Depot (16B), carrying pre-TOPS number D3861. In 1962 it was moved to Nottingham (16A) and lived there until the shed closed in 1967. Following the closure it spent 20 years at Crewe until purchase by now-defunct EWS in the 1990s for work at Toton (TO), and Old Oak Common (OC). After retirement in 2009, it was delivered to the Great Central in 2009 from Rotherham. Its restoration was completed in 2013, enabling it to operate at the September Diesel gala. This loco is currently out of traffic awaiting work, now located at Ruddington. | EWS Red & Gold. | Private owner. | 1959 | |
Off site

== Mainline diesel locomotives ==
Both railways have a large collection of heritage diesel locomotives and hold at least two galas each year to run them, in addition to parallel operations with the steam fleet.

| Number & Name | Description | History & Current Status | Livery | Owner(s) | Date | Photograph |
|---|---|---|---|---|---|---|
Operational
| No. D8154 | British Rail Class 20; Bo-Bo | D8154 was built by Vulcan (then under the control of English Electric) and had a more varied career than most members of the class, being based for spells on the London Midland, Eastern and Scottish Regions. In 1987 it was overhauled for the last time at Derby works, becoming the last one to receive such treatment. It was sold to EWS in 1999 and moved to the Churnet Valley Railway in 2000, remaining there until 2007. Now based at Ruddington, it has been restored to its 1970s condition. Returned to service in 2018 following overhaul and a repaint into BR Blue. | BR Blue (full-yellow ends). | English Electric Preservation. | 1966 | |
| No. D6535; Hertfordshire Rail Tours | British Rail Class 33; Bo-Bo | D6535 was built by Birmingham Carriage & Wagon Company and was based at Eastleigh (71A) during BR service, performing on a variety of duties including passenger service and banking assistance. After disbandment of British Railways it was sold to EWS for freight work and was put into storage at Old Oak Common (OC) after an accidental collision. By this time it had been selected to become part of the NRM and was moved to Loughborough in 2005. | BR Rail Blue (full-yellow ends). | National Railway Museum. 5305 Locomotive Association. | 1960 | |
| No. D6700 | British Rail Class 37; Co-Co | D6700 was built at the Vulcan Foundry (under the control of English Electric) as the first member of its class. It was later renumbered 37119 in 1974 and 37350 in 1988 after being upgraded to 37/3 configuration. The locomotive spent its working life based at depots such as Thornaby and March. In 1998, it was named National Railway Museum, and was subsequently donated to the museum upon its withdrawal from service with EWS in 1999. In 2022, the locomotive was placed on loan to the Heavy Tractor Group and it moved to the GCR in March that year. It will remain on the line for a minimum of five years | BR Green with the Late Crest (half-yellow ends). | National Railway Museum. Heavy Tractor Group. | 1960 | |
| No. 37714; Cardiff Canton | British Rail Class 37; Co-Co | The locomotive entered service in 1961 numbered D6724. it was renumbered to 37024 in 1973 and was allocated to depots such as Stratford and Cardiff Canton. In 1988 it was converted to be part of the refurbished heavyweight (Class 37/7) fleet where it lost its headcode boxes, was renumbered to 37714 and allocated to the Trainload Metals sector. In the mid-1990s it joined the EWS fleet which saw it work on railway infrastructure projects in Spain. In 2012 it was returned to the UK and became part of the DRS fleet, being used at Daventry International Rail Freight Terminal from the end of 2013. After this works contract ended, the locomotive was stored at Barrow Hill before being placed by DRS on loan to the GCR in 2016, under the care of the Heavy Tractor Group. The Heavy Tractor Group successfully raised funds to have 37714 repainted into Railfreight Triple Grey livery as it would have worn in the late 1980s. The repaint was completed in 2017 and the locomotive was also named Cardiff Canton, after one of the depots it was allocated to. The Heavy Tractor Group purchased the locomotive from DRS in 2018 and it remains operational at the GCR. | Railfreight Triple Grey with the Metals logo. | Heavy Tractor Group. | 1961 | |
| No. D123; Leicestershire and Derbyshire Yeomanry | British Rail Class 45; 1Co-Co1 | D123 was built at Crewe Works for use in the Midlands, first allocated to Derby (17A) and based there until 1965. Toton (TO) was to be its 1973 allocation, followed by Sheffield Tinsley Depot (TI) in 1986. Withdrawn in the following year, it remained in service and was used at Mickleover Test Track until 1990. It was selected (being in better condition than several other examples) for preservation in 1991 at Hull Dairycoates, but was purchased by the 5305LA and was transferred to Loughborough in 1998. Featured in Top Gear. | BR Economy Green (half-yellow ends). | 5305 Locomotive Association. | 1961 | |
| No. 46010 | British Rail Class 46; 1Co-Co1 | 46010 was built at Derby and was outshopped as D147 from new. Based in the Midlands until 1971, it was then transferred to the Western Region in 1971 to replace outdated diesel-hydraulic classes. In 1981 it moved again to Gateshead, but a series of major faults caused withdrawal in 1984. Narrowly escaping scrap, it was purchased for preservation at Llangollen in 1993. After several years of service it was offered a new home at Ruddington and has been actively based there since 2009. Following an extensive overhaul, it returned to passenger carrying service in April 2019. | BR Rail Blue (full-yellow ends). | D05 Preservation Ltd. | 1962 | |
| No. 50017 Royal Oak | British Rail Class 50 Co-Co | 50017 was built at Vulcan Foundry in Newton-le-Willows in April 1968. The class were first allocated to the West Coast Main Line to work express trains north of Crewe to Glasgow via Preston, Lancaster and Carlisle as the north of the WCML beyond Crewe was not yet electrified. From 1974 the northern half of the WCML was electrified and 50017 plus its classmates were transferred to the Western Region working mainline passenger services from London Paddington along the Great Western Main Line (GWML). These services ran to places like Oxford, Bristol as well as Plymouth and Penzance. 50017 was withdrawn from service in September 1991. Following spells at Tyseley and the Plym Valley Railway, it operated on the mainline for a period of time. It was purchased by the GCR in 2019, entering service in the April.. | Network SouthEast (Original) | | 1968 | |
Non-operational
| No. D8098 | British Rail Class 20; Bo-Bo | D8098 was built by Robert Stephenson and Hawthorns of Newcastle (then in the custody of English Electric), and was allocated first to Eastfield TMD in Glasgow, remaining there right up until the 1980s. It was then based at Tinsley (TI) and ended up spending its last years of work in the North East, finally withdrawn in 1991. It was purchased for preservation in 1992 and arrived on site at Loughborough, starting up again later in the same year. Underwent an overhaul in 2011. Stored awaiting repairs. | BR Green with the Late Crest (full yellow ends). | Type One Locomotive Company. | 1961 | |
| No. D5185; Castell Dinas Brân | British Rail Class 25; Bo-Bo | D5185 was built at Darlington Works in 1963, the last mainline locomotive constructed in the city before the completion of 60163 Tornado in 2008. It was first based at Toton (TO) but was then moved around and also saw service across all of Britain (sans the Southern Region), working from Crewe all the way to Edinburgh. In 1987 it became the last member of the class to haul a BR passenger train, and was soon withdrawn from service. 25035 sat at Humberstone Road until 9 September when it was moved to Vic Berry's yard. In 2004 it moved to Loughborough for bodywork repairs from Northampton, and has remained there ever since. Returned to service in 2015 following repairs and saw regular service until 2022 when it was withdrawn due to requiring an overhaul, which is underway. | BR Green with the Late Crest (half-yellow ends). | Private owner. | 1963 | |
| No. D5401 | British Rail Class 27; Bo-Bo | D5401 was built at Birmingham Carriage and Wagon Works of Smethwick. Originally based at Cricklewood (14A), it was re-allocated to Eastfield Depot in 1969 for push-pull trains between Glasgow and Edinburgh. In 1983 it was selected to haul the Royal Train along the West Highland Line to Fort William, and continued to sport the decor that had been put on for the occasion right up to withdrawal in 1987. In 1988 it was officially preserved and was to be based at the Northampton & Lamport Railway until 2007. D5401 failed at Leicester North during the September 2012 diesel gala and only returned to service in March 2013 after some work taking place including the rotten roof panels being replaced with new ones and repairs to the top part of the frames. Undergoing overhaul at Loughborough. | BR Green with the Late Crest (half-yellow ends). | Private owner. | 1962 | |
| No. D5830 | British Rail Class 31; A1A-A1A | D5830 was built at Brush Traction works and allocated to Sheffield. Through its working life it was renumbered 31297, 31463 and 31563, fitted with electric heating equipment and subsequently worked on civil engineering trains after the heating was disconnected. After ending its career at Toton TMD (TO) it was bought as a source of spares for another class 31, but proved to be in better condition and was restored instead. Today it wears the prototypical livery that was carried by scrapped sister D5579. Moved to Ruddington in 2020 and is undergoing an overhaul. | BR Golden Ochre with the Late Crest (half-yellow ends). | Type One Locomotive Company. | 1962 | |
| No. 37009 | British Rail Class 37; Co-Co | D6709 was built at Vulcan for allocation to Stratford Depot (ST). In 2001 after the disbandment of British Rail it was sold by English, Welsh and Scottish Railway (EWS) to Direct Rail Services and worked under them for two years. It was moved to the Churnet Valley Railway in 2003, work began on its traction generator. In 2007 it moved to Ruddington via Rushcliffe Halt, shortly after the Class 20s at the centre. Work is progressing to return it to traffic with an in-built steam boiler. | BR Blue with full yellow ends. | English Electric Preservation. | 1961 | |
| No. 1705; Sparrowhawk | British Rail Class 47; Co-Co | 1705 was another brush-built example of Class 47, but with a major difference. Built as a prototypical Class 48 (a 47 body with a Sulzer 12LVA24-type engine), it was refitted with a standard engine in 1969. It was based for most of its working life in Sheffield and ended its career in 1991, and was then purchased for preservation by Pete Waterman for the East Lancashire Railway. Since 1996 it has been based at Loughborough. Returned to service in 2018 following overhaul and a repaint into BR Blue. Stored awaiting repairs. | BR Blue (full-yellow ends). | Type One Locomotive Company. | 1965 | |

== Diesel multiple units ==
| Number and name | Description | History and current status | Livery | Owner(s) | Date | Photograph |
|---|---|---|---|---|---|---|
Operational
| Nos. 50321; 51427 | British Rail Class 101 DMCL; DMBS | Both units run frequently year-round to back up the steam and diesel services. Painted in lined green livery with whiskers at each end. 51247 received an overhaul and repaint offsite in 2015. 50321 had similar work completed in 2016. | BR Lined Green. | Renaissance Railcars. | 1958/59 | |
| Nos. 50266; 50203 | British Rail Class 101 DMCL DMBS | 50266 was returned to working order in 2008 and spent several years as a standby vehicle for use with 50321 and 51427. It was painted in unlined green livery with a half-yellow end during this time. 50203 was restored to use for the first time in May 2019 and was painted in BR blue with a full yellow end. 50266 was also repainted into BR blue, but instead with a half-yellow end. Both vehicles now operate as a two car unit. | BR blue. | Renaissance Railcars. | 1957 | |
| No. E59575 | British Rail Class 111 TSLRB | Owned by the same group custodian of the 101 units. The extensive restoration was completed in 2014 and the vehicle now runs as the centre coach as part of the green set sandwiched between 50321 & 51427. | BR lined green. | Renaissance Railcars. | 1960 | |
| No. W59506 | British Rail Class 117 TCL | Moved to the railway in 2021. | BR blue | | | |
Undergoing overhaul, restoration or repairs
| No. 56342 | British Rail Class 101 DTCL | Withdrawn from BR service in 1989. Arrived at Loughborough in April 2018 from Butterley. Undergoing restoration to passenger carrying condition. | BR Blue and Grey | Privately owned - In custodianship of Renaissance Railcars. | 1957 | ~ |
| No. E53645; W53926 | British Rail Class 108 DMCL; DMBS | Undergoing restoration at Ruddington, where work is focussed on the bodywork. 50645 is being worked on undercover. | BR Blue and Grey. | Nottingham (GC) DMU Group. | 1958/1959 | |
| No. W51138; W51151; W59501 | British Rail Class 116 DMBS; DMS; TCL | Undergoing overhaul, after running for a period in the mid-2000s. 59501 is a Class 117 unit. 51138 is being worked on indoors and 51151 outdoors. 59501 awaits attention. | BR Lined Green. | Pressed Steel Heritage Ltd. | 1958/1960 | |
| No. W55009 | British Rail Class 122 DMBS | Recently arrived at Loughborough, to be restored after 56342. | Green with small yellow warning panel. | Private Owner - in custodianship of Renaissance Railcars | 1958 | ~ |
| 144003 No. 55803; No. 55826 | British Rail Class 144 DMS; DMSL | The first Class 144 to be preserved, this was announced in December 2019. Arrived at Ruddington by low loader on 3 September 2020 and is being commissioned for service. Planned to be used on quieter days between Ruddington and Loughborough. | Northern Rail unbranded. | Private Owner | 1986 | |
Stored or static
| No. E50193 | British Rail Class 101 DMBS | Stored out of action in Rothley Carriage & Wagon Works. | BR Blue and Grey. | Renaissance Railcars. | 1957 | ~ |
| M59276 | British Rail Class 120 DMBS; DMS; TSLRB | 59276 operated for a time in the 1980s and 1990s on the GCR with Class 127 powercars 51616 and 51622, both of which departed the railway in January 2020. 59276 has been stored out of use in Swithland Sidings for a long period of time, awaiting major overhaul work. it is the only surviving Class 120 in preservation. | BR Lined Green. | Red Triangle Society. | 1959 | ~ |

== Coaching stock ==
Whole sets of coaches are in use on a daily basis, from rare LNER postal vehicles and observation cars to the far more common BR Mk1s.

=== British Railways Mark 1 coaches ===
The BR Mark 1 entered service in 1951 as a standardisation of passenger stock on all regions. They were built using the best elements of the four railway companies stock creating a very sophisticated design. One of the largest groups preserved is used every operating day at the Great Central Railway as they fit in well with the 1950s-style atmosphere. Those examples which are not in storage or under work are compiled into four uniformal rakes, each with brake and catering facilities.

| Number & Name | Description | History & Current Status | Livery | Owner(s) | Date | Photograph |
|---|---|---|---|---|---|---|
| No. 1012 | Mark 1 RSO | Awaiting restoration, however this is quite unlikely because its Ruddington base is being cleared out of any stock without any historic value or economic use. Before being taken out of service, it served as a cinema vehicle. | N/A. | Private Owner. | 1951 | ~ |
| No. ADE321047 | Mark 1 Unclassed RFO | Kept in storage after arriving in 2010; fate undecided. | N/A. (Graffitied) | BR Standard Coach Group. | 1951 | ~ |
| No. W15207 | Mark 1 CK | Stored. | BR Lined Maroon | BR Standard Coach Group. | 1953 | |
| No. W15208 | Mark 1 CK | Body stripped for spares and scrapped Spring 2012. Underframe and bogies for Diesel Brake Tender project, underframe now shortened for this role. | BR Lined Maroon | BR Standard Coach Group. | 1953 | ~ |
| No. E24421 | Mark 1 SK | Entered service in October 2017 after a long restoration, and now operational. Repainted in late 2024 from Chocolate and Cream. | BR Blood and Custard | BR Standard Coach Group. | 1953 | ~ |
| No. 3013 | Mark 1 FO | Arrived in 2011 under contract work for the East Somerset Railway, in fairly poor external condition. | BR Blue and Grey | Private owner. | 1954 | ~ |
| No. 3072 | Mark 1 FO | Stored pending overhaul. Arrived from Neville Hill 7/11, Departed to Rampart for Bodywork repairs, returned Summer 2019 for release into traffic in the Pullman Dining set in late 2019. | Pullman Style Umber & Cream | Private owner. | 1955 | ~ |
| No. 3042 | Mark 1 FO | Renovated in 2010 as part of a £215,000 project to create a new Pullman style train. It carries the logo of the project sponsors Cromwell Tools. | Pullman Style Umber & Cream | Great Central Railway Plc. | 1954 | |
| No. E21031 | Mark 1 BCK | Awaiting major bodywork repairs; interior also damaged by water-logging around the time of arrival. | BR Lined Maroon | Private owner. | 1954 | ~ |
| No. 24778 | Mark 1 SK | Arrived in late 2010 & is now undergoing overhaul, most work has been going towards the bottom-end & windows. | BR Chocolate and Cream | Private Owner. | 1954 | |
| No. E34393 | Mark 1 BSK | Operational. Refurbished and Repainted in 2018. | BR Blood and Custard | Private owner. | 1954 | |
| No. E43043 | Suburban Mark 1 CL | Operational. Restored by Cranmore Maintenance Services at East Somerset Railway between 2015 and 2019. | BR Crimson Lake | Private owner. | 1954 | ~ |
| No. M43289 | Suburban Mark 1 BT | Operational. Restored by Cranmore Maintenance Services at East Somerset Railway May 2013. | BR Crimson Lake | Private owner. | 1955 | ~ |
| No. 3172TL | Mark 1 BCK | Originally numbered 21138, this coach was used in Ireland as a steam heat boiler for diesel services. Bought by the GCR in 2007, it is planned to remain in use as such, but it requires repairs before returning to service. | Irish Rail Orange & Black | Great Central Railway Plc. | 1955 | |
| No. 3178TLA | Mark 1 BSK | Originally numbered 34590, this coach was also used in Ireland as a steam heat boiler for diesel services, and like the aforementioned 3172TL, was purchased in 2007 for the same function. Was used during the winter of 2008-2009 for this purpose, but has been stored since. | Irish Rail Orange & Black | Great Central Railway Plc. | 1955 | |
| No. E34738 | Mark 1 BSK | Stored out of working order, originally the subject of a possible wheelchair-users conversion. | BR blue and grey | Great Central Railway plc | 1955 | ~ |
| No. E3079 | Mark 1 FO | Operational. It was planned to partner it with 3042 in the Pullman style train, but this never happened as 3092 was used instead. Now used as part of the main dining rake. | Pullman Style umber and cream | Great Central Railway plc | 1956 | ~ |
| No. 4207 | Mark 1 TSO | Operational at Ruddington | Unlined maroon | Great Central Railway (Nottingham) Ltd. | 1956 | |
| No. E4630 | Mark 1 TSO | Refurbished during 2012 and returned to service in November of that year. | BR Blood and Custard | Great Central Railway Plc. | 1956 | |
| No. E9316 | Mark 1 BSO | Operational. This vehicle was converted for disabled passengers by British Rail apprentices at Derby in 1983. Now classified as a BSO(D). | BR Blood and Custard | Great Central Railway plc | 1956 | |
| No. E15960 | Mark 1 CK | Awaiting overhaul, but considering the need for the availability of high-capacity stock, it seems likely that this will be an early candidate for work. | BR Blood and Custard | Private owner | 1956 | |
| No. 34990 | Mark 1 BSK | On site for unknown reasons, but part of a four-coach re-railing maintenance set. | Departmental yellow and black | Private owner | 1956 | ~ |
| No. W80438 | Mark 1 POS | Available for mail-drop recreations at major special events year-round, such as seasonal steam events. Originally SK 25139, but heavily rebuilt into its current state. | Royal Mail (1960s) | Railway Vehicle Preservations Ltd. Private owner. | 1956 | |
| No. ADB975638 | Mark 1 BSK | Arrived in 2010, but the exact purpose of this is unknown. | N/A | Private owner | 1956 | |
| No. M1811 | Mark 1 RMB | Operational | BR Lined Maroon | Great Central Railway (Nottingham) Ltd. | 1957 | ~ |
| No. E4662 | Mark 1 TSO | Operational | BR Lined Maroon | Private owner | 1957 | ~ |
| No. W4758 | Mark 1 TSO | Rebuilt as a Bar Car, and returned to service in 2010 as part of the Cromwell Tools Pullman style train, with fictitious number 1899. Overhauled early 2025 and new repainted in Maroon with original number. | BR Lined Maroon | Great Central Railway Plc. | 1957 | |
| No. E4788 | Mark 1 SO | Operational. | BR Lined Maroon | Great Central Railway Plc. | 1957 | |
| No. M25312 | Mark 1 SK | Operational. | BR Lined Maroon | Private owner. | 1957 | ~ |
| No. M25366 | Mark 1 SK | Operational. Has seen use both sides of the GCR, heading to GCRN for Santa Specials. | BR Lined Maroon | Private owner. | 1957 | |
| No. 81343 | Mark 1 BG | Has seen use as a shop/booking office at Leicester North until station building was completed. Refurbished during 2010–2011 as the brake for the Cromwell Tools Pullman style train. Tables and Chairs fitted in Southern end of coach. | Pullman style Umber & Cream | Private owner. | 1957 | |
| No. M81382 | Mark 1 BG | Recently returned to service after overhaul. | BR Lined Maroon | Private Owner. | 1957 | |
| No. 94407 NBA | Mark 1 BG | Originally 81223 but since converted, and is likely to be removed along with any vehicles deemed unnecessary. | Departmental | Great Central Railway (Nottingham) Ltd. | 1957 | |
| No. 21184 | Mark 1 BCK | Operational. | BR Blood and Custard | Private owner. | 1958 | |
| No. 21202 | Mark 1 BCK | Arrived in 2010, but is one of the few coaches from that era not owned by BR Standard Coach Group. | N/A. | Private Owner. | 1958 | ~ |
| No. E86129 | Mark 1 GUV | In use as the storage van for the DMU group. Outshopped in full livery at the beginning of 2011, allowing for use on photographic specials and at santa special events. | BR Lined Maroon | Nottingham (Great Central) DMU Group. | 1958 | |
| No. 86168 | Mark 1 GUV | Kept at Loughborough when not in use. Also numbered at times 93168 and 96187 | Maroon | Renaissance Railcars. | 1958 | |
| No. 94707 | Mark 1 CCT | Operational, as the only example of its type bearing the livery it carries. | Tartan Arrow | Railway Vehicle Preservations Ltd. | 1958 | |
| No. 1525 | Mark 1 RKB | Restored as the kitchen vehicle for the Cromwell Tools Pullman style train in Ramparts of Derby in 2010. | Pullman style Umber & Cream | Great Central Railway Plc. | 1959 | |
| No. 3092 | Mark 1 FO | Operational, now outshopped in Blood & Custard Livery as of December 2021. | BR Blood and Custard | Private owner. | 1959 | |
| No. S4830 | Mark 1 TSO | Operational after major overhaul. | BR Blood and Custard | Great Central Railway Plc. | 1959 | ~ |
| No. E4857 | Mark 1 TSO | Operational after being overhauled & repainted in 2011. | BR Blood and Custard | Private owner. | 1959 | |
| No. E16070 | Mark 1 CK | Operational. | BR Lined Maroon | Private owner. | 1959 | |
| No. W80301 | Mark 1 POS | Operational after receiving repairs and repaint at Nemesis Rail Burton after damage in a collision during 2014. | Royal Mail (1960s) | Railway Vehicle Preservations Ltd. | 1959 | |
| No. 80307 | Mark 1 POS | Delivered from the Severn Valley Railway in exchange for ex-Departmental BSK 34606 in May 2012. Has seen limited use since arrival, but awaiting overhaul and repaint so as to join the 1960s TPO set. | Royal Mail | Private owner. | 1959 | ~ |
| No. 80401 | Mark 1 POT | Arrived February 2011 from the Gloucestershire Warwickshire Railway. Recently repaired and repainted, and now part of the 1960s TPO set. | Royal Mail (1960s) | Private owner. | 1959 | |
| No. 86709 | Mark 1 GUV | Stored. | BR Rail Blue | Private owner. | 1959 | ~ |
| No. 86830 | Mark 1 GUV | Operational. | Maroon | Private owner. | 1959 | |
| No. E93565 | Mark 1 GUV | Operational. | BR Rail Blue | Great Central Railway (Nottingham) Ltd. | 1959 | |
| No. E93579 | Mark 1 GUV | Operational. | Maroon | Railway Vehicle Preservations Ltd. | 1959 | ~ |
| No. E94286 | Mark 1 CCT | Overhauled in 2021 and now back in service. Fitted with Firefighting appliances for use to fight lineside fires in Summer months. | BR Lined Maroon | Private owner. | 1959 | |
| No. 96190 | Mark 1 GUV | Undergoing conversion to serve as a maintenance vehicle for the locomotives of the 5305LA. | Maroon | Private owner. | 1959 | |
| No. SC1100 | Mark 1 RE | Stored. Formerly part of the National Collection, the prototype griddle buffet car has been based here since 2009. While intended for use with the Cromwell Tools Pullman style train, another car was sourced and converted in its place. | BR Lined Maroon | Great Central Railway Plc. | 1960 | |
| No. E1526 | Mark 1 RKB | Operational as the kitchen car for the main dining rake. | Pullman style Umber & Cream | Great Central Railway Plc. | 1960 | |
| No. M1962 | Mark 1 RU | Operational. | BR Blood and Custard | Private owner. | 1960 | |
| No. 94709 | Mark 1 CCT | Stored. | Maroon. | Private owner. | 1960 | |
| No. 96194 | Mark 1 GUV | Stored. | InterCity Executive (Graffitied) | Private owner. | 1960 | |
| No. E1695 | Mark 1 RBR | Currently at Nemesis Rail Burton undergoing overhaul. | BR Lined Maroon | Great Central Railway Plc. | 1961 | ~ |
| No. 1898 (25788) | Mark 1 SK | In 2010, this coach was purchased from the Bo'ness and Kinneil Railway in Scotland, and rebuilt externally by Nemesis Rail to allow conversion into a bar car for the new Pullman style train. | Pullman style Umber & Cream | Great Central Railway Plc. | 1961 | |
| No. S4914 | Mark 1 TSO | Stripped for parts following collision damage, vehicle to be scrapped. Coach body scrapped and the underframe only remains. | BR Green | Great Central Railway Plc. | 1961 | |
| No. W13313 | Mark 1 FK | Operational. This vehicle was on loan to the Battlefield Line between December 2014 and March 2018. | BR Chocolate and Cream | Private owner. | 1961 | ~ |
| No. M16168 | Mark 1 CK | Operational. | BR Lined Maroon | Great Central Railway (Nottingham) Ltd. | 1961 | ~ |
| No. 16190 | Mark 1 CK | Operational. | BR Lined Maroon | Great Central Railway (Nottingham) Ltd. | 1961 | |
| No. W21242 | Mark 1 BCK | Operational. | BR Chocolate and Cream | Great Central Railway Plc. | 1961 | ~ |
| No. M25711 | Mark 1 SK | Operational. | BR Blue and Grey | Private owner. | 1961 | |
| No. E4922 | Mark 1 TSO | Operational. | BR Lined Maroon | Private owner. | 1962 | |
| No. M4948 | Mark 1 TSO | Operational. | BR Lined Maroon | Private owner. | 1962 | |
| No. W4982 | Mark 1 TSO | Operational. | BR Chocolate and Cream | Private owner. | 1962 | |
| No. E3126 | Mark 1 FO | Under Overhaul. | Pullman style Umber & Cream | Great Central Railway Plc. | 1963 | |
| No. S14026 | Mark 1 BFK | Stored out of traffic at Loughborough having been damaged in a collision during 2014. | BR Green | Private owner. | 1963 | |
| No. W80458 | Mark 1 BPOT | Available for mail-drop recreations at major special events year-round, such as seasonal steam events. | Royal Mail (1960s) | Railway Vehicle Preservations Ltd. Private owner. | 1967 | |
| No. 80345 | Mark 1 POS | Originally based at Didcot Railway Centre, but moved in Spring 2012 and repainted. Now available for mail-drop recreations at major special events year-round, such as seasonal steam events. | Royal Mail (1960s). | Private owner. | 1968 | ~ |
| No. W80349 | Mark 1 POS | Available for mail-drop recreations at major special events year-round, such as seasonal steam events. | Royal Mail (1960s) | Railway Vehicle Preservations Ltd. | 1968 | ~ |
| No. 13317 | Mark 1 Corridor First | Operational. Converted to a Verandah Coach for use in the Cromwell Tools Pullman style set. | Pullman style Umber & Cream | Private owner. | 1962 | ~ |
| No. 1649 | Mark 1 Buffet Restaurant | Operational. | BR Green | Private owner. | 1960 | ~ |

=== British Railways Mark 2 and Mark 3 coaches ===
More modern BR stock is not really at home on a railway with period recreation in mind, but many have found work behind the scenes of the heritage operations. However, the Northern section intends to create a full vacuum-braked Mk2 set to replicate another lost era in British Rail history, taking less-efficient vehicles out of rotation as better examples are brought in.

| Number & Name | Description | History & Current Status | Livery | Owner(s) | Date | Photograph |
|---|---|---|---|---|---|---|
| No. E9389 | Mark 2 BSO(T) | Operational and used regularly on NTHC steam and diesel services. Fitted with vacuum brakes and also has a running board fitted to enable the guard to have a view of the line saving the requirement for top and tail operation and more importantly the requirement for two drivers. | BR Lined Maroon. | Great Central Railway (Nottingham) Plc. | 1966 | |
| No. M17055 | Mark 2 BFK | Brought to Loughborough in 2010 for use as a support coach for 45305. Work should be completed at some point in 2012. | BR Lined Maroon. | Great Central Railway Plc. 5305 Locomotive Association. | 1966 | |
| No. 35512 | Mark 2 BFK | Currently out of service and being overhauled for return to service in 2015. | BR Blue & Grey. | Private owner. | 1967 | ~ |
| No. E14064 | Mark 2a BFK | Restored as a support coach in 2010 to join 30777 on the mainline. Will remain with the 5305LA locomotives for 2011. | BR Lined Maroon. | Great Central Railway Plc. 5305 Locomotive Association. | 1967 | |
| No. 5365; Deborah | Mark 2a TSO | Currently under overhaul including new interior and full repaint. | BR Blue & Grey. | Great Central Railway (Nottingham) Plc. | 1968 | ~ |
| No. 5376 | Mark 2a TSO | Currently out of service and being overhauled for return to service in 2015. | BR Blue & Grey. | Great Central Railway (Nottingham) Plc. | 1968 | ~ |
| No. E14099 | Mark 2a BFK | Restored as a support coach in early 2010 for use with 5305LA locomotives. With 70013 on the national network for the 2011 mainline season. | BR Lined Maroon. | Great Central Railway Plc. 5305 Locomotive Association. | 1968 | ~ |
| No. E5497 | Mark 2b TSO | Currently out of service and being overhauled for return to service in 2015. | BR Blue & Grey. | Great Central Railway (Nottingham) Plc. | 1971 | |
| No. 10558 | Mark 3 SLEP | Stored at the rear of the Loughborough locomotive shed, volunteer sleeping accommodation. | InterCity Swallow. | Great Central Railway Plc. | 1981 | |
| No. 10602 | Mark 3 SLEP | Workshop and support coach. | InterCity Executive. | Great Central Railway (Nottingham) Plc. | 1983 | ~ |

=== Great Central Railway coaches ===
When the Great Central Railway was formed it was billed under the slogan "Rapid travel in luxury" to boast what was considered the very latest and best in express passenger travel. Today the GCR Rolling Stock Trust based at Ruddington are the owners of the single largest collection of ex-GCR stock in the world.

| Number & Name | Description | History & Current Status | Livery | Owner(s) | Date | Photograph |
|---|---|---|---|---|---|---|
| No. 946 | MSLR six-wheel 5 compartment Third | Fully restored after a very long restoration. Usually on display in the Mountsorrel Museum. | GCR Chocolate and Cream | GCR Rolling Stock Trust | 1888 | ~ |
| No. 373 | MSLR six-wheel Third | Awaiting extensive restoration, the body has been dismantled and flatpacked. | N/A | GCR Rolling Stock Trust | 1889 | ~ |
| No. 1663 | Robinson Clerestory BCL | Only the body survives though being the oldest surviving Great Central carriage this is unsurprising. The body is mounted on the underframe of an ex. LMS BG, which has now become its permanent rolling chassis. | N/A. | GCR Rolling Stock Trust. | 1903 | |
| No. 5~~ | Robinson Suburban BT | Body survives in good hands but it will require a new underframe and serious restoration work to return to service. | N/A. | GCR Rolling Stock Trust. | 1905 | |
| No. 793 | Robinson Suburban T | At present the only Great Central coach on the south section. In store at Swithland Sidings with a cosmetically restored body, which should prevent further deterioration. | GCR chocolate & cream. | Great Central Railway Plc. | 1905 | ~ |
| No. 799 | Robinson Suburban T | Awaiting major restoration which will require a lot of new bodywork to be manufactured. | N/A. | GCR Rolling Stock Trust. | 1905 | ~ |
| No. 228 | Barnum TO | Undergoing restoration at Ruddington. It will be converted into a first class bar car in due course. | N/A. | GCR Rolling Stock Trust. | 1910 | |
| No. 664 | Barnum TO | Will be restored when more accommodation has been built. It is intended to convert it into a dining car. | Varnished teak. | GCR Rolling Stock Trust. | 1910 | |
| No. 666 | Barnum TO | Sheeted up as protection from the elements. It will be restored when more accommodation has been built and 664 has been completed. It is intended to convert it into a dining car. | N/A. | National Railway Museum. | 1910 | |
| No. 695 | Barnum BTO | Awaiting restoration, which is planned to incorporate a kitchen where the brake end used to be, so it will complement the rest of the Barnum set. | N/A. | GCR Rolling Stock Trust. | 1911 | |

=== London, Midland and Scottish Railway coaches ===
The GCR Plc does not generally rely on LMS stock for passenger trains, but has instead found other uses for what is available. See Coaches of the London, Midland and Scottish Railway.

| Number & Name | Description | History & Current Status | Livery | Owner(s) | Date | Photograph |
|---|---|---|---|---|---|---|
| No. M31255 | Stanier Period III BG | Grounded body at the back of Loughborough Central MPD, where it works as a fundraiser for various railway charities. | Green undercoat. | Great Central Railway Plc. | 1941 | |
| No. M31370 | BR-built Stanier Period III BG | Grounded just outside Loughborough Central for general storage. | Green undercoat. | Great Central Railway Plc. | 1949 | |
| No. 999503; Arrowvale Belle | BR-built INSP | Brought out to the Great Central from EWS like M999504 for passenger use. Fitted for special trains with its own fine dining and guard's compartment. | LMS Lined Maroon. | EWS. | 1959 | |
| No. M999504 | BR-built INSP | On loan to the LSLG since 2004 for use on both standard and special trains. On loan to the Ecclesbourne Valley Railway. | BR Lined Maroon. | Loughborough Standard Locomotive Group. EWS. | 1959 | |

=== London and North Eastern Railway coaches ===
RVP Ltd owns and cares for a collection of Gresley Teak-panelled vehicles in the United Kingdom. They intend to return a full rake of varnished teak coaches to service in the coming years. See Coaches of the London and North Eastern Railway.

| Number & Name | Description | History & Current Status | Livery | Owner(s) | Date | Photograph |
|---|---|---|---|---|---|---|
| No. 18033 | Gresley CK | Stored out in the open barely protected against the elements at Rothley. This carriage is the only survivor from the original LNER Flying Scotsman express train, so will most likely return to service in this form. Until a space in the shed is available, work continues to cosmetically maintain the overall wooden structure. | N/A. | Railway Vehicle Preservations. | 1924 | |
| No. 62565 | Gresley BTK | Undergoing restoration, though with most of the work focused on Buffet 24278, it could be a long wait for a return to service. | Varnished teak. | Railway Vehicle Preservations. | 1927 | ~ |
| No. 1222 | Gresley RF | Stored round the back of Swithland Sidings for future restoration into varnished teak. | N/A. | Railway Vehicle Preservations. Private owner. | 1929 | ~ |
| No. E70268E | Gresley POT | E70268E started out as a BGP, but was converted during commercial service and is now part of RVP's two-coach mail set. It is now awaiting an overhaul and further interior refurbishment, though still sees public displays during major events annually. | Deep maroon. | Railway Vehicle Preservations. | 1931 | |
| No. 2704 | Gresley BGP | Converted for use in a Casualty Evacuation train for World War II in 1939. Delivered from the Lakeside and Haverthwaite Railway in 2009 to replace steel-bodied BGP 70442E (which has since been scrapped). Restored to its 1943 Hospital Train livery in 2018. | Railway Vehicle Preservations. | 1936 | ~ | |
| No. 23981 | Gresley TTO | Since the completion of 24278 in 2011, a new campaign was launched to raise £35,000 for restoration, and work will begin when enough of the money has been raised. | N/A. | Railway Vehicle Preservations. | 1936 | |
| No. 24080 | Gresley RB | Stored outside in the Rothley carriage & wagon department for restoration. As two other RB vehicles are preserved at the Great Central, the owner has decided to convert it into a RF in the standard teak condition. | N/A. | Railway Vehicle Preservations. Private owner. | 1936 | |
| No. E1719E | Gresley OBS | Operational in almost-daily service to first class ticket holders. The quality of the restoration earned RVP and its members the Heritage Railway Association award 2007. Underwent overhaul and repaint over winter 2011–12 to refresh bodywork. | BR Lined Maroon. | Railway Vehicle Preservations. Private owner. | 1937 | |
| No. E1729E | Gresley OBS | Undergoing restoration at Barrow Hill into 1937 condition, which is due to be completed in 2012, though the scope of its service after restoration remains uncertain. | N/A. | Railway Vehicle Preservations. Private owner. | 1937 | ~ |
| No. 24278 | Gresley RB | Re-launched into service on 23 July 2011, 24278 became fully operational at the 2011 Autumn Steam Railway Gala. | Varnished teak. | Railway Vehicle Preservations. | 1937 | |
| No. E9124E | Gresley RB | Sold by RVP in 2005, making it the only LNER coach outside of RVP's ownership. In 2006 it was involved with the crash that also damaged 45305, though remained in service until October 2007. Has been out of service since then awaiting repairs. | BR Blood & Custard. | Great Central Railway Plc. | 1937 | |
| No. E70294E | Gresley POS | Operational as the only one of its type with working postal equipment, allowing use on demonstration mail drops. Work still needs to be done to conclude the restoration, but is otherwise an immaculate piece of vehicle preservation. | Deep maroon. | Railway Vehicle Preservations. | 1937 | |
| No. 57451 | Gresley BTK | Awaiting light restoration, but as the body's condition is very good, more attention will need to be paid to the less complete coaches before starting on this one. | Varnished teak. | Railway Vehicle Preservations. | 1940 | |
| No. 4050 | Gresley BGP | Operational as a guard's van on the odd passenger train. Bodywork re-varnished during 2011 to match up better with 24278. | Varnished teak. | Railway Vehicle Preservations. | 1940 | |
| No. E70654E | BR-built Thompson BZ | In 2011 it was repainted into a deeper maroon to match the LNER postal vehicles and was fitted out as a shop to raise funds for the owning charity. | Lined maroon. | Railway Vehicle Preservations. | 1950 | |
| No. E96202E | BR-built Gresley CCT | Built in 1928 as a CL, but is considered a new vehicle due to the heavy modifications made. Out of service for the foreseeable future. | Maroon. | Railway Vehicle Preservations. Private owner. | 1959 | ~ |

=== Other coaches ===
Some of the stock is completely unique to the railway.

| Number & Name | Description | History & Current Status | Livery | Owner(s) | Date | Photograph |
|---|---|---|---|---|---|---|
| No. 793 | GCR Robinson T | Awaiting restoration. | GCR Chocolate & Cream. | Main Line Steam Trust Ltd. | 1905 | ~ |
| No. 547 | NSB Konductorvagn | Underframe only, may yet be used on another body. | N/A. | Private owner. | 1912 | ~ |
| No. 2118 | NER RFO | Awaiting restoration. | N/A. | Great Central Railway Plc. | 1922 | ~ |
| No. E87674 | Blue Spot FVY | Operational. | White. | Private owner. | 1960 | ~ |
| No. 889006 | Ferry CCT | Undergoing restoration. | N/A. | Great Central Railway Plc. | 1961 | ~ |

=== Southern Railway vans ===
Most heritage railways in the U.K. use parcels and miscellaneous vans for storage purposes, and the Great Central Railway is no exception. See Southern Railway (Great Britain)#Carriages.

| Number & Name | Description | History & Current Status | Livery | Owner(s) | Date | Photograph |
|---|---|---|---|---|---|---|
| No. S1334 | Bulleid PMVY | Grounded body used for storage at Loughborough Central. | N/A. | Private owner. | 1939 | |
| No. S1375 | Bulleid PMVY | Grounded body used for storage at Loughborough Central. | N/A. | Thomson B1 Locomotive Society. | 1939 | |
| No. S1706S | Bulleid PMVY | Operational, used on the Permanent Way train. | SR Olive Green. | Private owner. | 1943 | |

== Goods wagons ==
The GCR has a very extensive range of wagons and goods vans. Many are used as working vehicles on the railway for the transport of rail, ballast and equipment. Still more are used to run demonstration freight trains at the GCR's gala events illustrating a time when most goods were carried by rail.

=== Cranes ===
| Number | Wagon Type | Built | Date | Photograph |
|---|---|---|---|---|
| DRA81549 | 12T Heavy Duty diesel crane. | Joseph Booth & Sons | 1958 | ~ |
| ADRR 95208 | GWR 45T steam crane. | Ransomes & Rapier | 1939 | |
| ADRC96709 | BR 76T Heavy Duty diesel crane. | Cowans Sheldon | 1961 | |

=== Windcutter ===
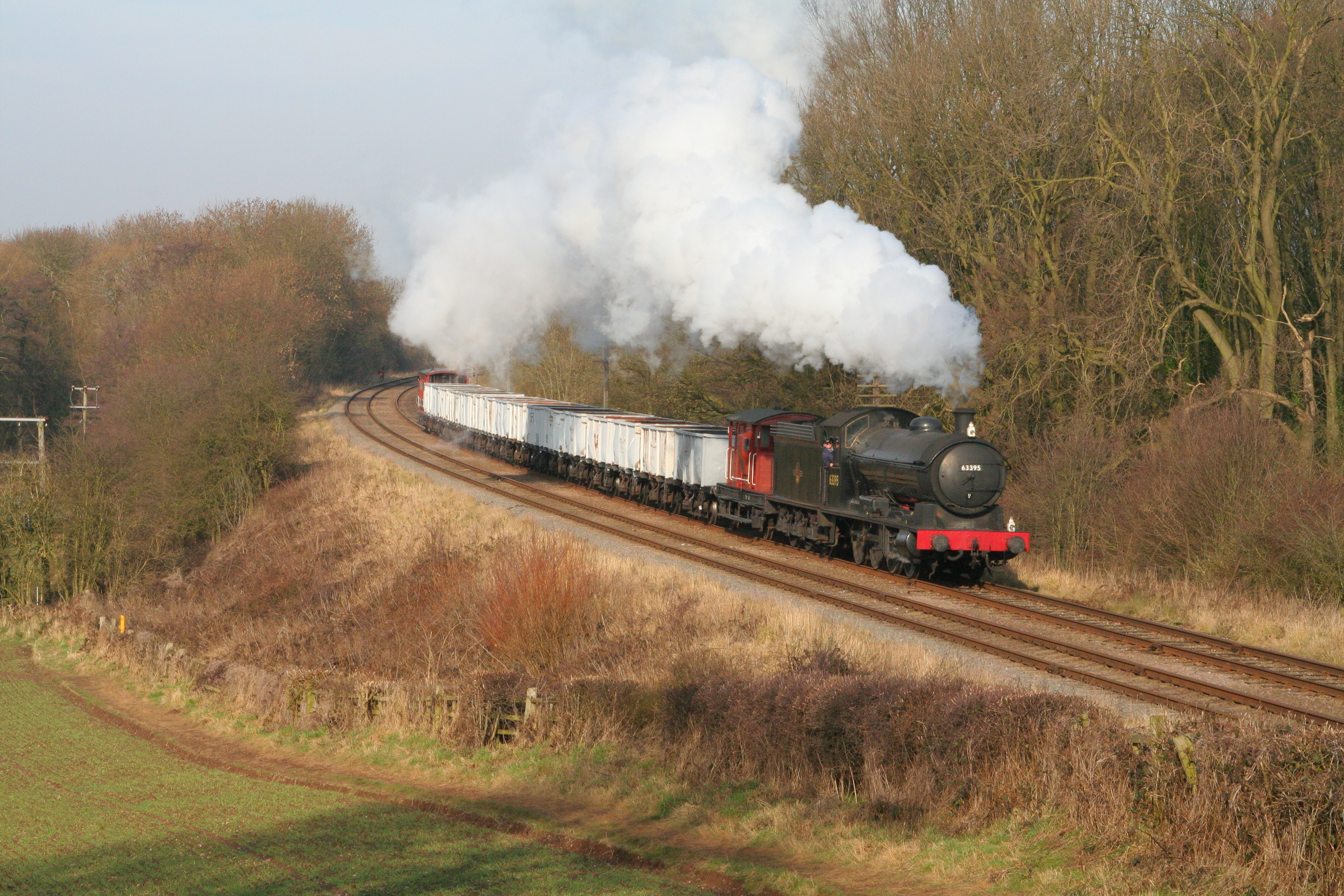
63395 with the windcutter set.

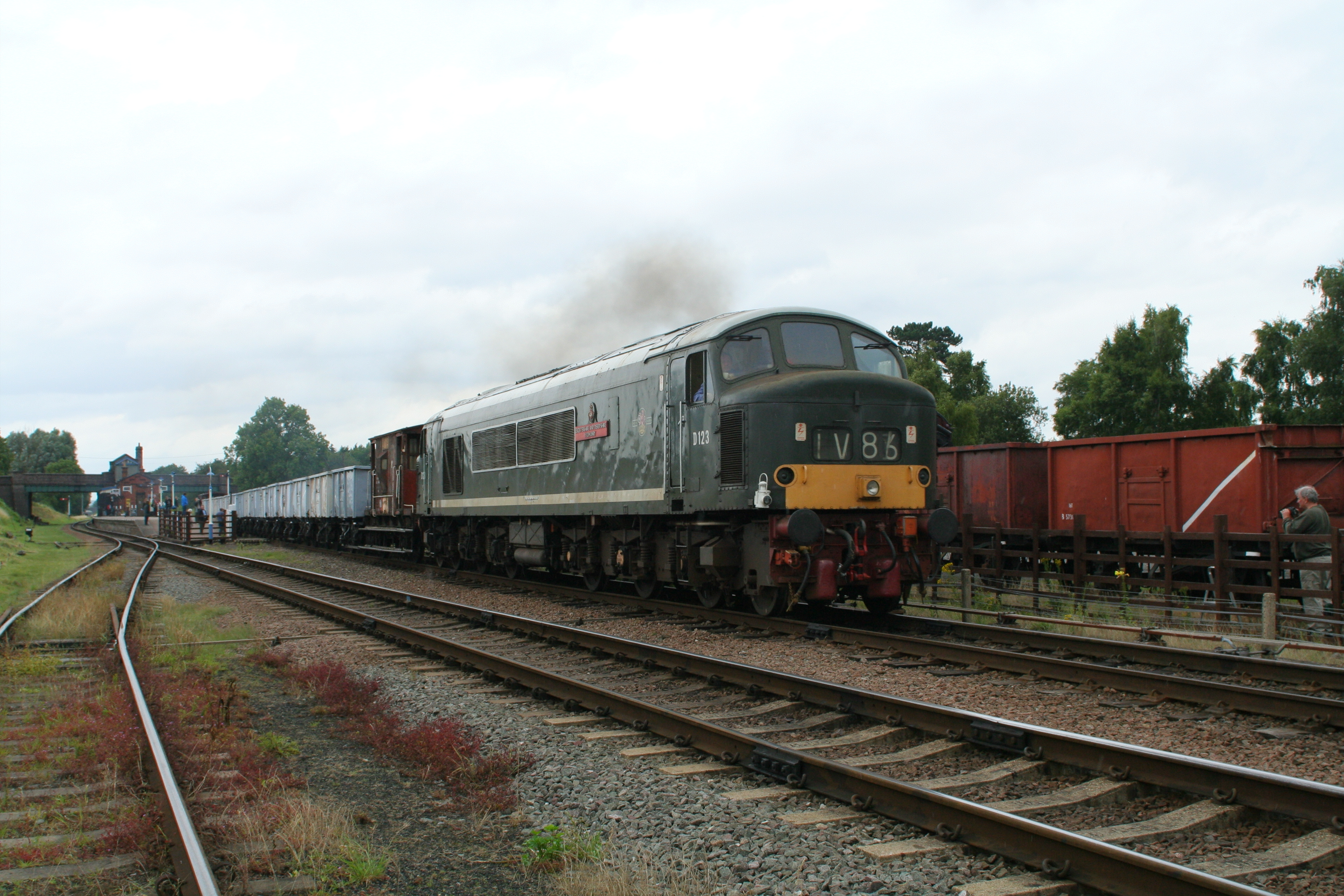
D123 with the windcutter set.

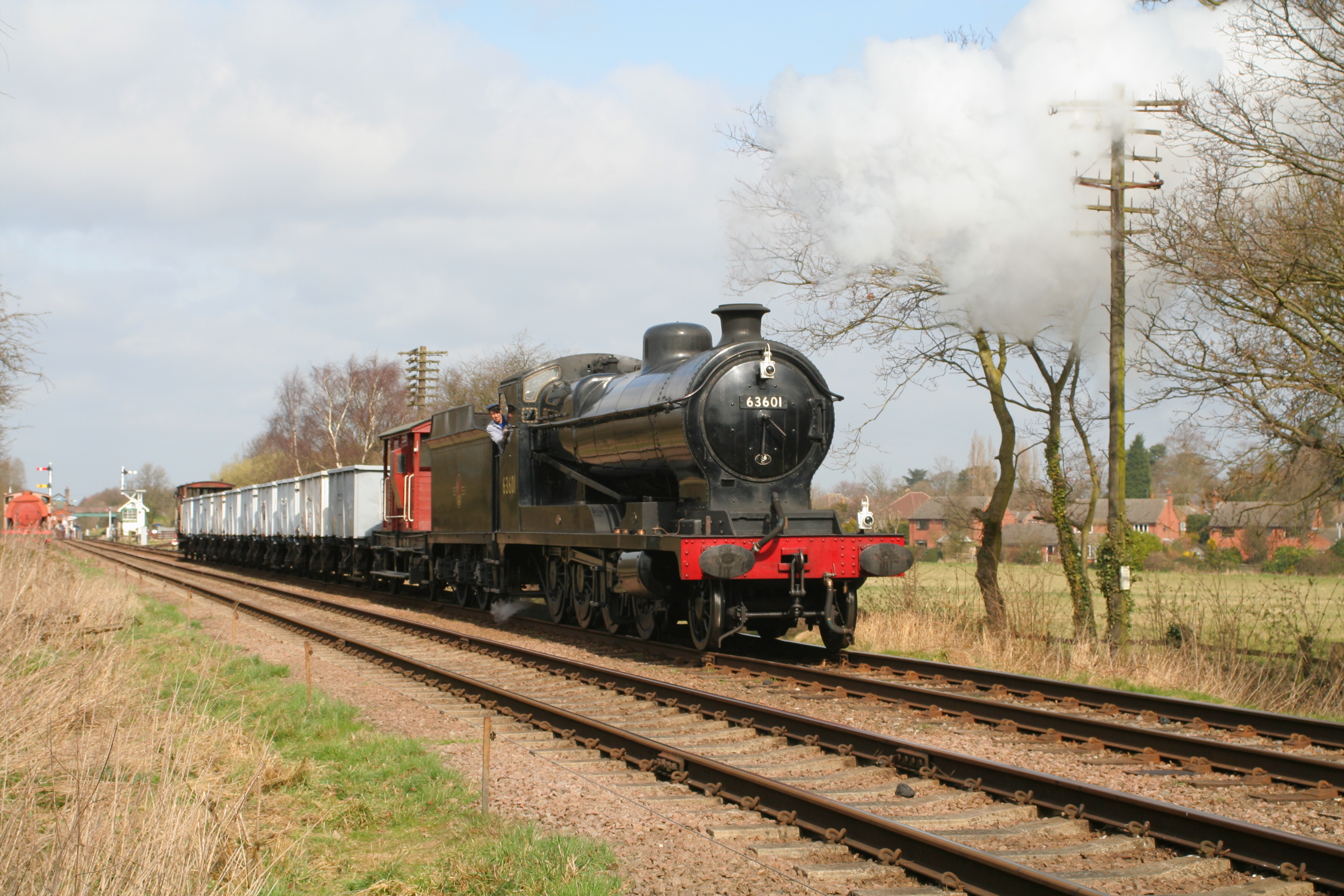
63601 with the windcutter set.

Lengthy trains of mineral wagons were a common feature on British Railways and the Windcutter Project set out to recreate such scenes. The idea of preserving a long train of mineral wagons was first aired in Steam Railway early in 1992 and following an encouraging initial response an appeal was launched in the August issue to purchase suitable wagons for use on the Great Central Railway. The appeal was a huge success, Steam Railway readers and supporters of GCR raised over £14,000 to purchase and restore the wagons.

With the exception of the two un-restored wagons, all the mineral wagons in the ‘Windcutter’ fleet are either fitted with vacuum brake or have been through piped to run in a vacuum braked train. This means that to be fully authentic all the wagons should carry British Railways ‘Bauxite’ livery. However the original aim of the project was to recreate the sight of long trains of unfitted mineral wagons as seen on the GCR in BR days and all over the BR network in the days of steam, and in some areas even as late as the early 1980s. All BR un-fitted freight vehicles were painted grey and hence to recreate the overall appearance of a steam era mineral train the majority of the wagons in the ‘Windcutter’ fleet have been restored in this colour.

| Number | Previous owner | Photograph | Current Status | Notes |
|---|---|---|---|---|
| B64020 | Rover Cars Ltd | | Serviceable | Recently overhauled Rothley. Originally given the number B279720 by the GCR. The original identity of this wagon is unknown, therefore it has been numbered B64020, a number picked from a suitable batch of similar wagons. |
| B593185 | Rover Cars Ltd | | Serviceable | Recently overhauled Rothley. Originally given the number B279706 by the GCR. Now carries its original, as-built number. |
| B562230 | Rover Cars Ltd | | Serviceable | Originally given the number B279701 by the GCR. Now carries its original, as-built number. |
| B279702 | Rover Cars Ltd | | Serviceable | ~ |
| B279707 | Rover Cars Ltd | | Serviceable | ~ |
| B279710 | Rover Cars Ltd | | Serviceable | |
| B279711 | Rover Cars Ltd | | Serviceable | ~ |
| B279713 | Rover Cars Ltd | | Serviceable | ~ |
| B279718 | Rover Cars Ltd | | Serviceable | ~ |
| B279719 | Rover Cars Ltd | | Serviceable | ~ |
| B279721 | Rover Cars Ltd | | Serviceable | ~ |
| B279722 | Rover Cars Ltd | | Serviceable | ~ |
| B279723 | Rover Cars Ltd | | Serviceable | ~ |
| B279725 | British Coal Onllwyn Washery | | Serviceable | ~ |
| B279742 | Rover Cars Ltd | | Serviceable | ~ |
| B551846 | Rover Cars Ltd | | Serviceable | ~ |
| B573403 | Transrail | | Serviceable | ~ |
| B581241 | Rover Cars Ltd | | Serviceable | ~ |
| B589204 | Rover Cars Ltd | | Serviceable | ~ |
| B596329 | Rover Cars Ltd | | Serviceable | ~ |
| B98858 | Rosyth Naval Dockyard | | Not Serviceable | Stored in Swithland sidings |
| B99163 | Rosyth Naval Dockyard | | Not Serviceable | Stored in Swithland sidings |
| B165121 | British Coal Onllwyn washery | | Not Serviceable | Un-restored vehicle |
| B212705 | Rosyth Naval Dockyard | | Not Serviceable | Stored in Swithland sidings |
| B273798 | British Coal Onllwyn washery | | Not Serviceable | Un-restored vehicle |
| B279703 | Rover Cars Ltd | | Not Serviceable | Stored in Swithland sidings |
| B279704 | Rover Cars Ltd | | Not Serviceable | Stored in Swithland sidings |
| B279705 | Rover Cars Ltd | | Not Serviceable | Stored in Swithland sidings |
| B279714 | Rover Cars Ltd | | Not Serviceable | Stored in Swithland sidings |
| B279716 | Rover Cars Ltd | | Not Serviceable | Stored in Swithland sidings |
| B279717 | Rover Cars Ltd | | Not Serviceable | Stored in Swithland sidings |
| B279724 | Rover Cars Ltd | | Not Serviceable | Stored in Swithland sidings |
| B566224 | Rover Cars Ltd | | Not Serviceable | Stored in Swithland sidings |
| B568314 | Rover Cars Ltd | | Not Serviceable | Stored in Swithland sidings |
| B570618 | Transrail | | Not Serviceable | Stored in Swithland sidings |
| B573124 | Rover Cars Ltd | | Not Serviceable | In use as a permanent way department vehicle. |

=== Army wagons ===
| Number | Wagon Type | Built | Date | Photograph |
|---|---|---|---|---|
| ROF 36 | Bogie Flat. | Fairfield Bridge & Engineering | 1945 | ~ |
| MOS 5254 | 10T Ventilated Van. | Metro Cammell | 1939 | ~ |
| WD 8127 | 50T Warflat. | Metro Cammell | 1942 | ~ |
| Army 47528 | 10T Non-Ventilated Van. | NBR | 1920 | ~ |
| Army 47534 | 10T Non-Ventilated Van. | NBR | 1920 | ~ |
| MoD 47758 | 12T Pallet Van. | MoD | 1963 | ~ |
| MoD 47804 | 12T Pallet Van. | MoD | 1963 | ~ |
| WD 360332 | Weltrol. | ~ | 1942 | ~ |

=== Tank wagons ===
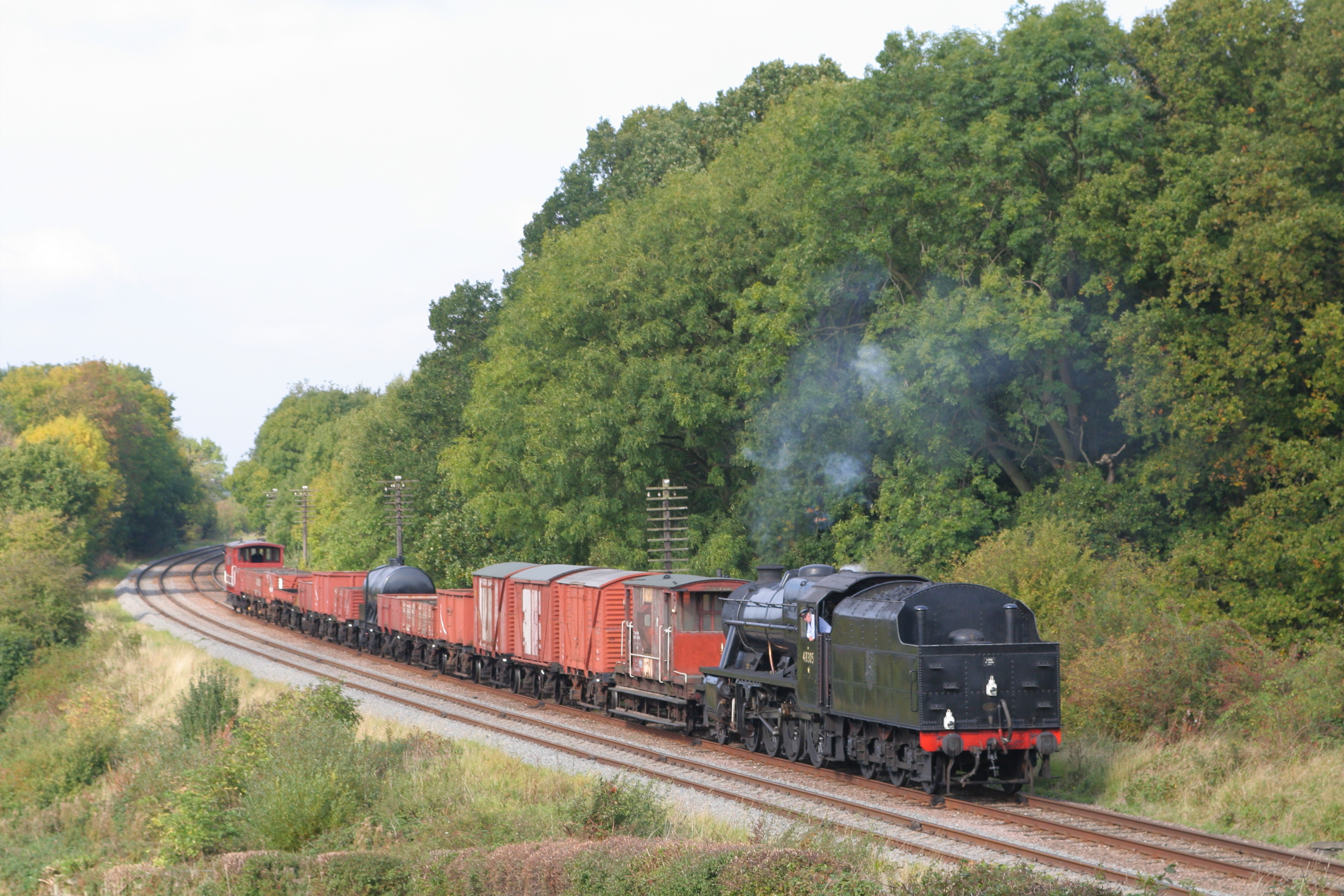
48305 Great Central Railway

| Number | Wagon Type | Built | Date | Photograph |
|---|---|---|---|---|
| CBV5 | 14T Aviation Fuel Class A tank wagon. | G.R. Turner | 1942 | ~ |
| AM2335 | Esso 14T Class B tank wagon. | RY Pickering | 1941 | ~ |
| A4513 | Shell-BP 14T Class B tank wagon. | Hurst Nelson | 1941 | ~ |
| A6071 | Shell-BP 20T Class B tank wagon. | Charles Roberts | 1948 | |
| A7514 | Fuel Oil Class B tank wagon. | Hurst Nelson | 1943 | ~ |
| PO51408 | STL Clay Slurry tank wagon. | Chas Roberts | 1965 | ~ |
| DB998926 | BR 14T Creosote Tanker. | Chas Roberts | 1959 | |
| ADB999016 | Lubricating Oil Class B tank wagon. | Fairfield Bridge & Engineering | 1948 | ~ |
| ADB999023 | Fuel Oil Class B tank wagon. | Chas Roberts | 1958 | ~ |

=== MSLR wagons ===
| Number | Wagon Type | Built | Date | Photograph |
|---|---|---|---|---|
| 356 | Well Trolley | CR | 1913 | |
| M179998 | 12T Ventilated Van. | ~ | 1929 | ~ |
| M336550 | 20T Tube wagon. | Wolverton | 1933 | ~ |
| M500954 | 12T Ventilated Van. | Derby | 1934 | ~ |
| B780680 | 12T Ventilated Van. | Wolverton | 1934 | ~ |
| M510044 | 12T Ventilated Van. | Wolverton | 1936 | ~ |
| DM731833 | 20T Brake Van. | Wolverton | 1944 | ~ |
| M477301 (now Mountsorrel 127) | 3 plank open wagon. | Derby | 1945 | ~ |

=== LMS wagons ===
| Number | Wagon Type | Built | Date | Photograph |
|---|---|---|---|---|
| (M)730562 | LMS 20T Brake Van. | Derby | 1938 | |

=== LNER wagons ===
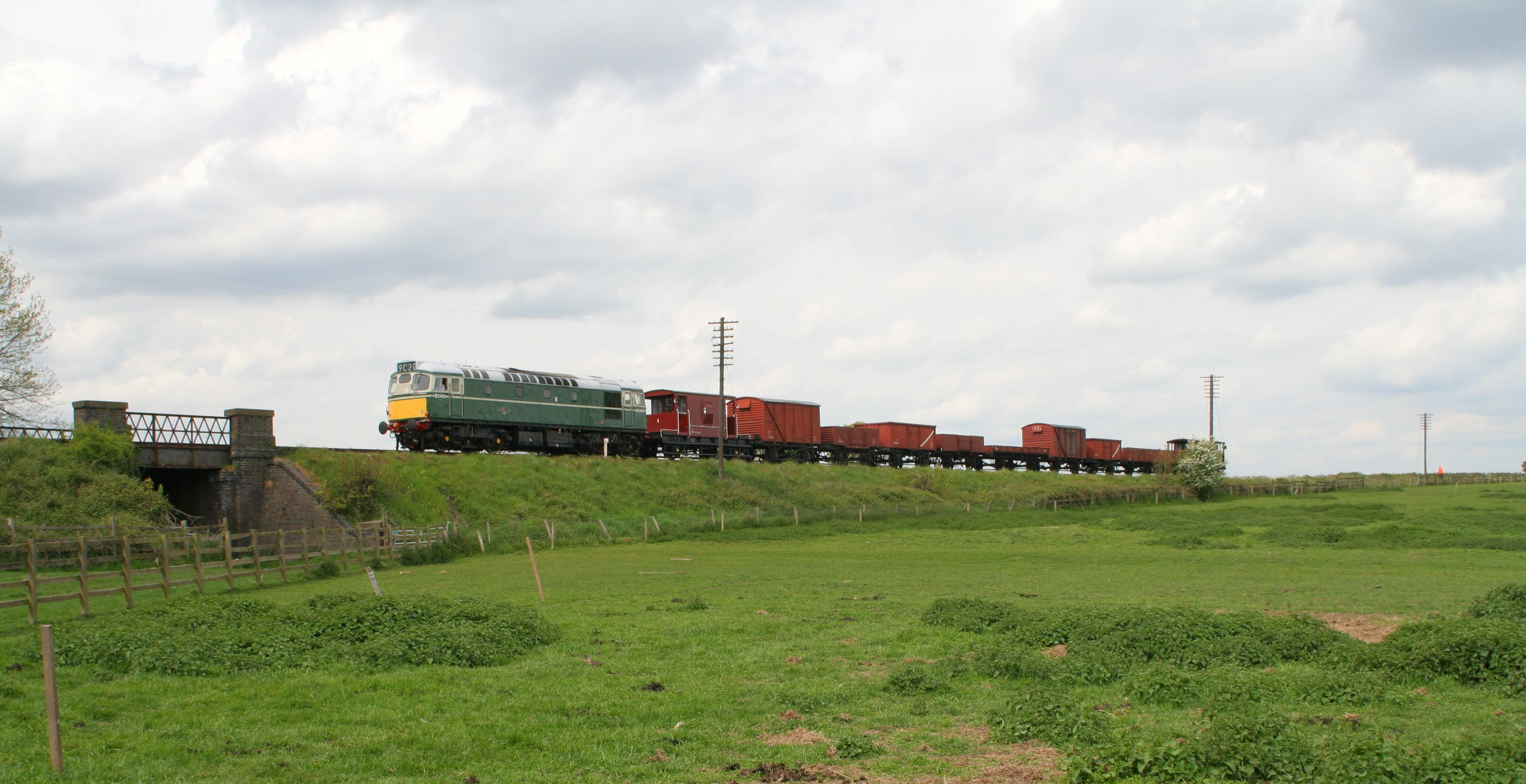
D5401 Great Central Railway

| Number | Wagon Type | Built | Date | Photograph |
|---|---|---|---|---|
| E212315 | 20T Plate wagon. | Metro Carriage Wagon | 1937 | ~ |
| 269001 | 20T Lowmac flat. | Shildon | 1945 | ~ |
| E281882 | 13T High Goods wagon. | Shilden | 1946 | ~ |
| E280364 | 13T High Goods wagon. | Shilden | 1947 | |
| E301588 | 20T Tube Wagon. | Cambrian Wagon Co. | 1947 | ~ |
| E312422 (now Mountsorrel 539) | 5 plank open wagon. | Ashford | 1949 | ~ |
| DE470809 | 40T Dolphin Bogie Flat. | Head Wrightson | 1948 | ~ |

=== Southern wagons ===
| Number | Wagon Type | Built | Date | Photograph |
|---|---|---|---|---|
| S48564 | SR 12T Ventilated Van. | Ashford | 1936 | ~ |
| S56010 | SR 25T Brake Van. | Lancing | 1930 | |

=== British Railway wagons ===
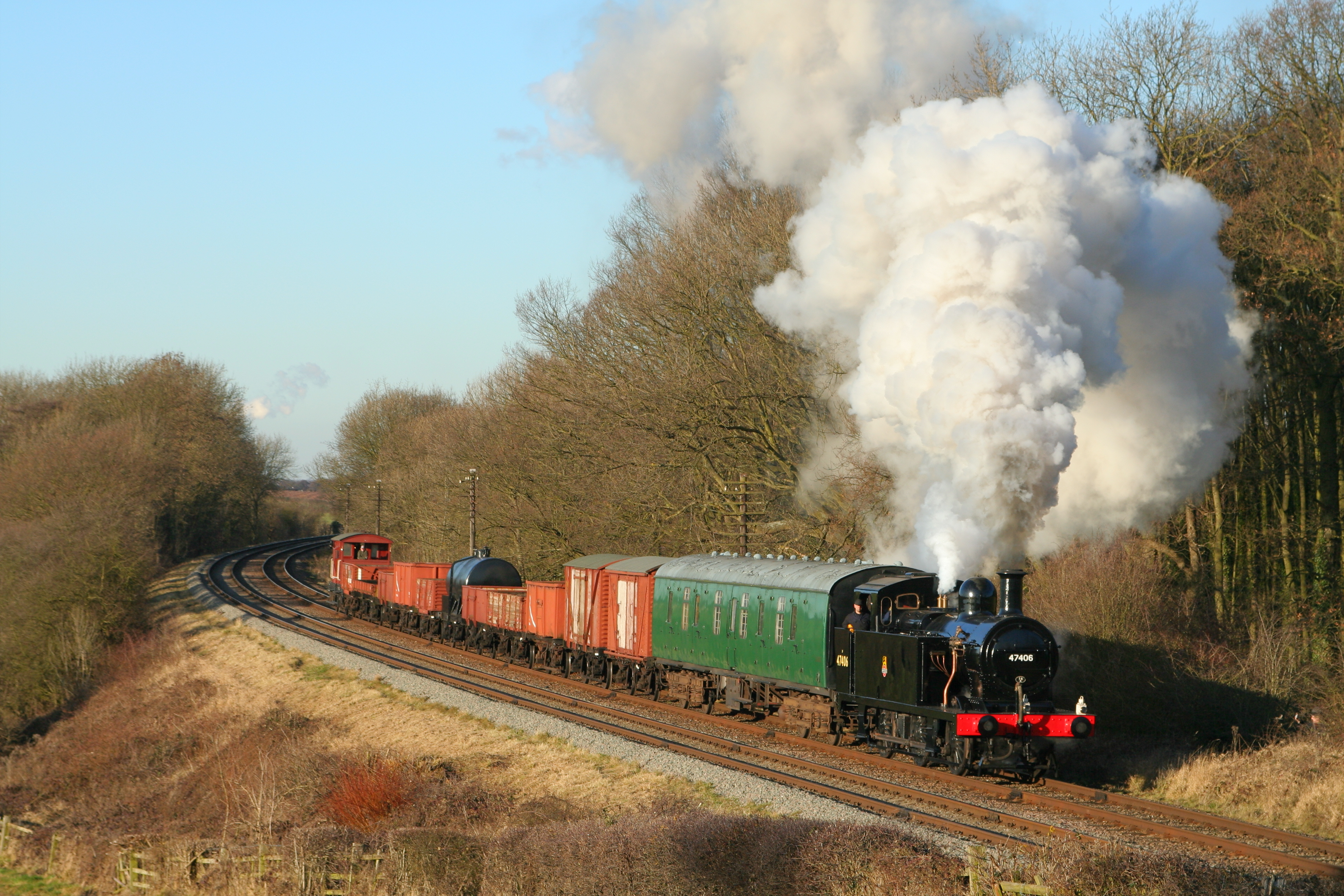
47406 Great Central Railway

| Number | Wagon Type | Built | Date | Photograph |
|---|---|---|---|---|
| E87674 | Blue Spot Fish Van. | Faverdale | 1960 | |
| BDC110626 | 32T Bass Open wagon. | Shildon | 1979 | ~ |
| B385782 | 27T Iron Ore Tippler. | Derby | 1958 | |
| B425356 | 21T Coal Hopper. | Head Wrightson | 1957 | ~ |
| B439708 | 25.5T Ironstone Hopper wagon. | Shildon | 1958 | |
| B458484 | 13T Medfit open wagon. | Ashford | 1951 | ~ |
| B461074 | 13T Steel open wagon | Ashford | 1955 | |
| B462772 | 16T Palbrick B wagon. | Ashford | 1959 | ~ |
| B505313 | 13T Conflat A wagon. | Pressed Steel | 1958 | ~ |
| B507397 | 13T Conflat A wagon. | Pressed Steel | 1958 | ~ |
| B507489 | 13T Conflat A wagon. | Pressed Steel | 1959 | |
| B550356 | 16T Mineral wagon. | Birmingham Railway Carriage & Wagon | 1958 | |
| B721587 | 12T 5 plank Shocbar. | Derby | 1951 | |
| B724570 | 12T 5 plank Shock wagon. | Derby | 1956 | ~ |
| B726344 | 20T Shockhood B. | Derby | 1963 | ~ |
| B732357 | 22T Tube wagon. | Faverdale | 1955 | ~ |
| B737695 | 11T Conflat A wagon. | Ashford | 1959 | ~ |
| B740654 | 12T Pipe open wagon. | Swindon | 1952 | |
| KDB753722 | 12T Ventilated Van. | Wolverton | 1950 | ~ |
| B760940 | 12T Ventilated Van. | Faverdale | 1954 | ~ |
| B762035 | 12T Ventilated Van. | Wolverton | 1952 | ~ |
| B762855 | 12T Ventilated Van. | Wolverton | 1954 | ~ |
| B763305 | 12T Ventilated Van. | Wolverton | 1952 | ~ |
| B765272 | 12T Ventilated Van. | Faverdale | 1957 | ~ |
| B765288 | 12T Ventilated Van. | Faverdale | 1957 | ~ |
| B768184 | 12T Ventilated Van. | Wolverton | 1955 | ~ |
| B769754 | 12T Ventilated Van. | Faverdale (Darlington) | 1957 | ~ |
| B771908 | 12T Pallet Van. | ~ | ~ | ~ |
| B772709 | 12T Ventilated Van | Ashford | 1956 | ~ |
| B774329 | 12T Ventilated Van. | Wolverton | 1957 | ~ |
| B776852 | 12T Ventilated Van. | Ashford | 1958. | ~ |
| B777171 | 12T Ventilated Van. | Ashford | 1958 | ~ |
| B777356 | 12T Ventilated Van. | Wolverton | 1958 | ~ |
| B777728 | 12T Ventilated Van. | Wolverton | 1958 | ~ |
| B779978 | 12T Ventilated Van. | Ashford | 1958 | ~ |
| B780282 | 12T Ventilated Van. | Ashford | 1958 | ~ |
| B781843 | 12T Pallet Van. | Wolverton | 1960 | ~ |
| B783082 | 12T Ventilated Van. | Wolverton | 1962 | ~ |
| B783184 | 12T Ventilated Van. | Wolverton | 1962 | ~ |
| B784186 | 12T Ventilated Van. | Derby | 1962 | ~ |
| B784409 | 12T Ventilated Van. | Derby | 1962 | ~ |
| B786348 | 12T Ventilated Van. | Pressed Steel | 1961 | ~ |
| B850498 | 12T Shocvan. | Ashford | 1950 | ~ |
| B851213 | 12T Shocvan. | Faverdale | 1952 | ~ |
| B852744 | 12T Shocvan. | Faverdale | 1955 | ~ |
| B852838 | 12T Shocvan. | Faverdale | 1955 | ~ |
| B853552 | 12T Shocvan. | Faverdale | 1956 | ~ |
| B853718 | 12T Shocvan. | Faverdale | 1957 | ~ |
| B853841 | 12T Shocvan. | Faverdale | 1957 | ~ |
| B854097 | 12T Shocvan. | Faverdale | 1957 | ~ |
| B854371 | 12T Shocvan. | Faverdale | 1957 | ~ |
| B854651 | 12T Shocvan. | Faverdale | 1958 | ~ |
| B854782 | 12T Ventilated Van | Faverdale | 1958 | |
| B854944 | 12T Shocvan. | Faverdale | 1959 | ~ |
| B855007 | 12T Shocvan. | Faverdale | 1959 | ~ |
| B855667 | 12T Pallet Van. | Wolverton | 1961 | ~ |
| ADB889006 | 14T Motor Car Van. | Lancing | 1961 | ~ |
| DB901203 | 55T Bogie Well Trolley. | Ashford | 1964 | ~ |
| DB916549 | 4w Steel Bolster. | Shildon | 1957 | ~ |
| DB928135 | 42T Bogie Bolster D. | Charles Roberts | 1962 | |
| B950690 | 20T Brake Van. | Faverdale | 1950 | ~ |
| B954268 | 20T Brake Van. | Faverdale | 1958 | |
| B954433 | 20T Brake Van. | Faverdale | 1958 | ~ |
| B954956 | 20T Brake Van. | Faverdale | 1959 | ~ |
| DB972018 | 21T Rudd wagon. | GRCW | 1958 | ~ |
| DB972608 | 21T Rudd wagon. | ~ | 1957 | ~ |
| DB972681 | 21T Rudd wagon. | ~ | 1957 | ~ |
| DB983166 | 24T Dogfish Ballast Hopper. | Wakefield | 1957 | ~ |
| DB983393 | 19T Catfish Ballast Hopper. | Metro Cammell | 1957 | ~ |
| DB983593 | 24T Dogfish Ballast Hopper. | Shildon | 1960 | ~ |
| DB983603 | 24T Dogfish Ballast Hopper. | Shildon | 1960 | ~ |
| DB984642 | 20T Grampus wagon. | Derbyshire C&W | 1957 | ~ |
| DB984713 | 20T Grampus wagon. | GRCW | 1957 | ~ |
| DB985730 | 20T Grampus wagon. | Shildon | 1954 | ~ |
| DB985884 | 20T Grampus wagon. | Shildon | 1953 | ~ |
| DB985933 | 20T Grampus wagon. | Butterley Co. | 1954 | ~ |
| DB989252 | 14T Mermaid Ballast wagon. | Metro Cammell | 1955 | ~ |
| DB990585 | 20T Grampus wagon. | Shildon | 1952 | ~ |
| DB991079 | 20T Tunny Ballast wagon. | Swindon | 1948 | ~ |
| DB991408 | 20T Grampus wagon. | Pressed Steel | 1958 | ~ |
| DB992447 | 20T Herring Ballast Hopper. | Metro Cammell | 1952 | ~ |
| DB992714 | 24T Dogfish Ballast Hopper. | Wakefield | 1956 | ~ |
| DB993304 | 24T Dogfish Ballast Hopper. | Chas Roberts | 1957 | ~ |
| DB993128 | 24T Dogfish Ballast Hopper. | Wakefield | 1956 | ~ |
| DB993412 | 24T Dogfish Ballast Hopper. | Metro Cammell | 1957 | ~ |
| DB993478 | 24T Dogfish Ballast Hopper. | Metro Cammell | 1957 | ~ |
| DB993560 | 19T Catfish Ballast Hopper. | Metro Cammell | 1957 | ~ |
| DB993757 | 20T Shark Ballast Plough. | BRCW | 1954 | ~ |
| DB993886 | 20T Shark Ballast Plough. | BRCW | 1957 | ~ |
| DB994761 | 50T Bogie Sturgeon A. | Head Wrightson | 1953 | ~ |
| DB996000 | Salmon Bogie Flat. | Derby | 1949 | ~ |

== Former GCR based locomotives ==
UNFINISHED

=== Steam locomotives ===
| Number & Name | Description | History & Current Status | Livery | Owner(s) | Date | Photograph |
|---|---|---|---|---|---|---|
| No. 1 | GNR Stirling 4-2-2 | No. 1 was the first of the class to be built in 1870. Steamed on the Great Central Railway in the 1980s. Now based at the National Railway Museum in York. | GNR Apple Green | National Railway Museum | 1870 | |
| No. 506 Butler-Henderson | GCR Class 11F | 506 was the prototype 11F built in 1919 by the Great Central Railway for passenger work, became LNER 5506 in 1923, 2660 in 1946 and renumbered 62660 in 1948 by British Railways. Was withdrawn from service in November, 1960. Was based at the Great Central Railway when steaming in the late 1970s, 1980s and early 1990s until its boiler ticket expired. Now based at Barrow Hill Roundhouse. | GCR Green | National Railway Museum | 1919 | |
| No. 1744 | GNR Class N2; 0-6-2T | 1744 was built by the North British Locomotive Company, and was one of many of the class fitted with condensing units for work in the London Underground. Based for most of its working life at King's Cross (34A), its main duties were on suburban trains. Withdrawn in 1962 at New England depot (35A), it was purchased for preservation, first at Doncaster and then at the Keighley and Worth Valley Railway, where several broken tubes caused it to be moved to Loughborough in 1975. Boiler ticket is due to expire in 2019, now its third overhaul since preservation. Fitted with TPWS and OTMR equipment for its mainline trips to Cromer and around the national mainline network whilst based on North Norfolk Railway. Now based at the North Norfolk Railway. | GNR Apple Green. | The Gresley Society. | 1921 | |
| No. 4141 | GWR 5101 Class | 4141 was first restored in 1998. It operated on the Great Central Railway from 2003 and departed shortly after its boiler ticket expired in 2010. Now based at the Epping Ongar Railway. | BR Lined Green | Private Owner. | 1946 | |
| No. 56; Ruddington | Robert Stephenson and Hawthorns (56 Class); 0-6-0ST No. 7667 | 56 was built to a design developed by the makers to the specification of S&L based upon experience of the operation of Manning Wardle Locomotives and test operation of the Hunslet Austerity type for work at Corby. After withdrawal from service in 1969 56's first home in preservation was at the Kent and East Sussex Railway, operating there for a short period in the 1970s, before moving to Ruddington in the early 1990s with sister engine 63 Corby. The locomotive had two stints of service at Ruddington, in the 1990s and late 2000s/early 2010s. It was the first locomotive to haul a passenger train at Ruddington in 1993. Following several years of storage, the locomotive was sold at the end of 2020 and, along with 63, departed Ruddington in February 2021. Now based at the Epping Ongar Railway. | Plain Black | Private Owner. | 1950 | |
| No. 63; Corby | Robert Stephenson and Hawthorns (56 Class); 0-6-0ST No. 7761 | Corby was built by Robert Stephenson and Hawthorns of Newcastle in response to the success of the first batch of seven locomotives designed to work at Stewarts & Lloyds. Withdrawn from service in 1969 from Corby and was preserved on the Keighley and Worth Valley Railway, 63 worked on the K&WVR for a short time in the 1980s. After a period of being on static display transferred to Ruddington in 1997, returned to steam in 2005 but then withdrawn for firebox repairs in 2007. These were completed in December 2011, allowing the locomotive to operate until 2015, when it was withdrawn from service. At the end of 2020 the locomotive was sold and, along with 56, departed Ruddington in February 2021. Now based at the Epping Ongar Railway. | Lined Green | Private Owner. | 1954 | |
| No. 7821 Ditcheat Manor | GWR 7800 Class | Ditcheat Manor was restored in 1998 and operated on the Great Central Railway from 1999 to 2005 when it moved to the Churnet Valley Railway. Sold to the West Somerset Railway in 2007 after the boiler ticket expired. Now on display at Swindon Steam Railway Museum. | BR Lined Black | West Somerset Railway | 1950 | |
| No. 45231 The Sherwood Forester | LMS Stanier Class 5 4-6-0 | 45231 spent most of its early career at Patricroft shed before being transferred to Northampton and then Aston in 1954. Its final depot was Carnforth, where it remained until the end of steam in 1968. It was initially preserved at Carnforth until moving to Loughborough in 1973 where it operated the official opening train between Loughborough and Quorn. it was a regular performer at Loughborough and was overhauled another couple of times. It left Loughborough in 2005 and in 2015 was purchased by Jeremy Hosking. The locomotive remains a regular performer on the main line. Now based at Crewe. | BR Lined Black | Jeremy Hosking | 1936 | |

=== Diesel locomotives ===
| Number & Name | Description | History & Current Status | Livery | Owner(s) | Date | Photograph |
|---|---|---|---|---|---|---|
| 236364 Marblaegis | Ruston & Hornsby 88DS; 4wDM | Marblaegis was built by Ruston & Hornsby to work at the British Gypsum foundry at Rushcliffe and East Leake, which is still part of the railway complex which makes up the Great Central's preserved northern section. In 1991 it was withdrawn from service and was chosen to remain at the railway as preserved. After 11 years spent in open storage it was towed to the heritage complex, covered in a decade of residue from the Gypsum company. A full overhaul and repaint followed and it returned to service in Summer 2003. It performed on shunting duties at Ruddington on some days and was repainted again in 2009. The locomotive now resides on the fledgling Invergarry and Fort Augustus Railway, having moved there around 2015. | Green. | Private owner. | 1946 | |
| 313394 (D2971) | Ruston & Hornsby 165DS; 0-4-0DM | 313394 moved to Ruddington in 2003, sporting BR Green with Wasp Stripes and the number D2971. Following a couple of years of use, it was withdrawn from service and placed into storage. It departed Ruddington in around 2008 and moved to the Telford Steam Railway. It has been returned to service and is a regular performer at Telford, still sporting the same BR Green livery. | BR Green with Wasp Stripes and Late Crest | Private owner. | 1952 | |
| 371971 Qwag | Ruston & Hornsby 48DS; 4wDM | Qwag spent all of its working life at Frederick Parker LTD in Leicester, operating until 1969 when it was placed into storage. It was the first locomotive to be based at the newly preserved Great Central Railway, arriving at Loughborough in 1972. The locomotive was extremely useful in the early days of the railway, performing most of the shunting duties and assisting with the rebuilding of the line. Eventually the needs of the growing line outgrew the locomotive's capabilities and more powerful shunters were gradually acquired. Qwag fell out of use and spent a number of years in storage at the dock at Quorn. In 2004 it was purchased by one of the volunteers at the Ruddington end and the locomotive was restored to working condition in 2010. Eventually, the locomotive became surplus to requirements and was sold to a fledgling railway in East Yorkshire in 2013. | Green. | Private owner. | 1954 | |
| D3690 (08528) | British Rail Class 08; 0-6-0DE | D3690 originally entered traffic in March 1959, and was mainly based on the Eastern Region of BR until EWS took over its ownership and concentrated its activities from Toton. From archive photographs it is possible to see that it originally carried green livery with the standard diesel version of the lion and wheel totem displayed on its body side and battery box side. When moving to Stratford depot it underwent a repaint receiving a smart BR blue livery with the words "Liverpool Street Station Pilot" painted along the running plate. Whilst at Stratford it has received a new power unit which remains today. When moving to Peterborough the loco again received new colours, this time a single dark grey engineer's livery. In preservation, the loco carries the British Railways green livery. The locomotive departed in October 2020 and is now based at the Derwent Valley Light Railway. | BR Green (Late Crest) without wasp stripes | Private Owner | 1955 | |
| D4115 (08885) | British Rail Class 08; 0-6-0DE | 08885 was withdrawn from service in May 1993 and moved to Ruddington the following year. Originally arriving in BR Blue, it was repainted into BR Green with Wasp Stripes, gaining its original identity of D4115. It was regularly deployed on shunting duties around Ruddington yard. It moved away from Ruddington in 2004 and ended up working back on the national network, having been sold to RT Rail. It then passed into the ownership of RMS Locotec and is currently in long-term storage at Wolsingham on the Weardale Railway. | RMS Locotec Blue with Wasp Stripes | RMS Locotec | 1962 | |
| D9520 | British Rail Class 14; 0-6-0DH | D9520 was built in 1964 and was initially allocated to Cardiff Canton Depot and ended its working life working for the Corby Ironstone Quarries system, passing into preservation at the North Yorkshire Moors Railway in 1981. It then moved to the Rutland Railway Museum (now Rocks by Rail) in 1984 and spent many years operating passenger trains there. In 1998 the locomotive moved to Ruddington where it saw some service before being withdrawn for overhaul. It left Ruddington in April 2004 with this work still in progress, moving to the Nene Valley Railway where it was returned to passenger carrying service and has remained there ever since, still in regular service. | BR Green with wasp stripes | Iron and Steel Traction Group | 1964 | |
| D8007 (20007) | British Rail Class 20; Bo-Bo | D8007 was built in 1957 and remained in service until 1993. Initially, it was preserved by the English Electric Preservation Group at the Churnet Valley Railway and its restoration began. In 2007 the locomotive moved to Ruddington and its restoration was completed in the same year. The locomotive remained operational at Ruddington until it was sold and moved off site in around 2015. The locomotive has now been returned to mainline operation, where it can now be seen regularly on various duties. | BR Green with Yellow Warning Panels | | 1957 | |
| D7629 (25279) | British Rail Class 25; Bo-Bo | D7629 was built in 1965 and has a 21-year operational career, mainly based in the Midlands and North West of England. It was withdrawn from service in Marc 1987 and was preserved at the Llangollen Railway in 1988. It remained at Llangollen until 1997 and spent time at Chinnor and Gloucestershire before being sold to its present owner in 2000. Initially preserved at Loughborough, it moved to Ruddington around 2003 where it was a mainstay in operations for many years. It departed Ruddington in 2015, first moving to the Ecclesbourne Valley Railway, before moving to its current base, the East Lancashire Railway in 2018. After many years in BR Green, the locomotive now wears BR Blue with full yellow ends, and its later number of 25279. It remains operational. | BR Blue with Full Yellow Ends | Private owner. | 1965 | |
| 37075 | British Rail Class 37; Co-Co | 37075 was built in 1962 and spent time at a variety of depots around the country. At some point in its operational career, it suffered accident damage to one of its noses and this was replaced by a different style of nose with one end being the original split head-code design, the other being flat and with no head-code boxes. This irregularity still exists today. In 1998 the locomotive was preserved and moved to Ruddington where it was restored to working order and could be regularly seen hauling passenger trains. During its time at Ruddington, it first sported Railfreight Grey and then BR Blue. In 2005, the locomotive departed Ruddington and spent some time at the Ecclesbourne Valley Railway and then the Churnet Valley Railway, before departing to the Keighley and Worth Valley Railway in 2012, having been purchased by several of the railway's volunteers. The locomotive remains operational and can still be seen hauling passenger trains. | Railfreight Grey with Full Yellow Ends | Private owner. | 1962 | |
| No. 56097 | British Rail Class 56; Co-Co | 56097 was built at Doncaster Works and entered traffic in October 1981, allocated initially to Tinsley depot. In its early years of service it was primarily a Yorkshire coalfield locomotive but its sphere of operation widened in later years and it also spent time allocated to Toton, Thornaby and Immingham depots. It was purchased from EWS in 2002 and overhauled by a very small team initially at the former Cathays Depot in Cardiff, and subsequently at the Ruddington site of the GCRN. The power unit was overhauled off site by North Lincs Engineering and then reinstalled at Brush Traction where a bogie swap was also undertaken. Following load banking on site at Ruddington 56097 entered service in 2008. Since then it has seen use on passenger services and on one occasion a freight train. On 23 October 2010 56097 hauled an incoming train of gypsum from Loughborough to East Leake Gypsum works with a trailing load of 1450t plus a GBRf class 66/7. As well as operating at Ruddington, it also visited other galas such as at the Mid Norfolk Railway and East Lancashire Railway. Departed Ruddington in November 2022 and is stored at Longport. | Trainload Coal (half-yellow ends). | Private owner. | 1981 | |
| Nos. M51616; M51622 | British Rail Class 127 DMBS; DMS; TSLRB | M51616 carries the name "Alf Benney". After being out of action for more than 10 years, M51616 and M51622 returned to service at the September 2013 Diesel gala. Withdrawn from traffic soon after, pending bodywork and maintenance work. In early 2020 the unit departed for the Helston Railway for overhaul to working order, having been on the GCR for 35 years. | BR Lined Green. | Private owner. | 1959 | |
| No. 28; Bardon | Andrew Barclay; 0-4-0DM | Bardon was built at Andrew Barclay's Caledonian Works in Kilmarnock. Originally named Duke of Edinburgh, it worked at Bardon Hill Quarries in Leicestershire for 25 years until being put out of use in 1981. After four years in active storage it was given away to the Great Central's former owning charity in 1985. Its main job was to pilot permanent way trains for the extension of the line between Rothley and Belgrave and Birstall, but upon its completion it was taken out of service once again. This loco was based at Rothley, as a shed pilot for the Railway Vehicle Preservations carriage works. Moved to Peak Rail for restoration, now believed to be based at the East Lancashire Railway. | Lined Green. | Private owner. | 1956 | |
