= Post van =

A post van may be:

- A postal delivery vehicle, see Mail truck
- A railway car for carrying mail, known as a Travelling Post Office in the UK or a railway post office in the US
  - Brake Post Office stowage van
  - Post Office sorting van
  - Post Office stowage van
