= Composite Corridor =

British Rail Composite Corridor
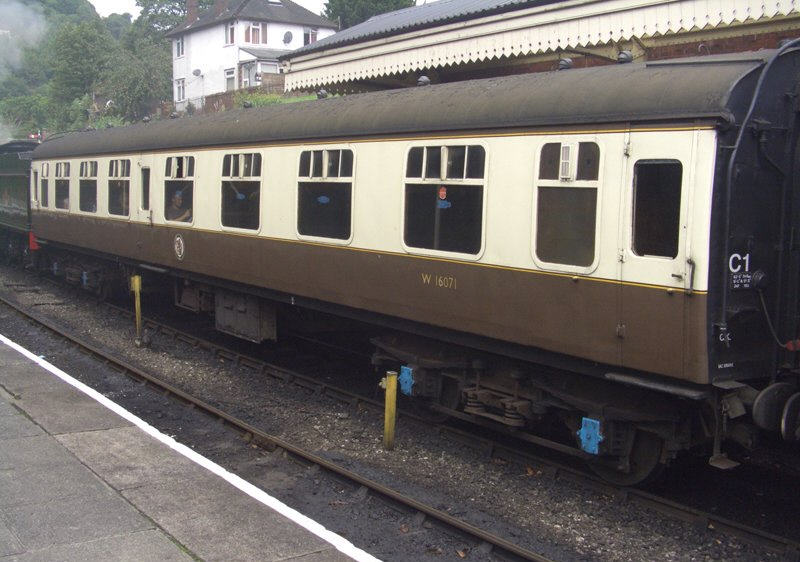
- W16071 CK at Llangollen on 28 August 2006
- In service: 1952–
- Manufacturers: BR Derby (C&W), Ashford, Eastleigh, and Wolverton Works; Birmingham Railway Carriage and Wagon Company, Charles Roberts, Cravens, Metro Cammell
- Family name: British Railways Mark 1
- Constructed: 1952–1961
- Number built: 1268
- Fleet numbers: 15000–16227
- Capacity: 24 First, 18 or 24 Second
- Operator: British Rail

Specifications
- Car length: 64 ft 6 in (19.66 m)
- Width: 9 ft 3 in (2.82 m)
- Height: 12 ft 9 1/2 in (3.90 m)
- Maximum speed: BR1/Commonwealth: 90 mph (145 km/h), B4: 100 mph (161 km/h)
- Weight: 32–37 tonnes (31–36 long tons; 35–41 short tons)
- Bogies: BR1, Commonwealth, or B4
- Track gauge: 4 ft 8 1/2 in (1,435 mm) standard gauge

The Composite Corridor (or CK) is a railway coach with a number of compartments, some of which are standard class (previously second, née third class) and some first class, linked by a side corridor.

== History ==
The composite coach was a standard coach design going back to the early days of railways, enabling a railway company to provide multi-class passenger accommodation in a single vehicle and so reduce costs. In the book "Red For Danger" by L.T.C Rolt it is mentioned that the train which came to grief at Wigan on the night of 2 August 1873 featured a Caledonian Railway composite coach. Early composite coaches did not feature corridors or gangways between the vehicles.

=== Gangwayed stock ===
Once communicating gangways between coaches were introduced, a side corridor was provided to allow passengers and staff to walk up and down the train, while seated passengers in compartments were not disturbed, and thus the various types of side-corridor coaches were developed.

=== Non-gangwayed stock ===
Most of the major railway companies also constructed non-gangwayed composite coaches for use on suburban lines, running under the designation of "CL" (as opposed to CK for the gangwayed version). These had a side corridor connecting all the compartments of one class to a central toilet, with a similar corridor connecting the compartments of the other class to a different toilet. Thus first class passengers could therefore move between the first class compartments, and third/second class passengers could likewise move about their area, but there was no communication between the classes or to adjacent coaches. Several of these vehicles from various railway companies have been preserved, with a South Eastern & Chatham vehicle, 1133, at the Isle of Wight Steam Railway, though currently stored as its underframe is overhauled, an LNER Thompson version, 88339, at the North Yorkshire Moors Railway, though also stored pending a full overhaul, and seven BR versions at various lines across Britain, though as of June 2018, only four are in operation, these being 43010 at the Stephenson Railway Museum, 43012 at the Llangollen Railway, 43041 at the North Norfolk Railway, and 43003 at the Keighley and Worth Valley Railway.

== Big 4 ==
All of the "Big 4" British railway companies created in the "Grouping" of 1923 operated Corridor Composite coaches.

== BR Mk1 version ==
The British Railways Mark 1 CK, built from 1951 onwards, had four First-class and three Third-class (Second-class from 1956) compartments, with a vestibule separating the 1st and 2nd sections, and a sliding door (usually fixed open) to divide the corridor.

There were two variants; those built to Diagram 126 for the Midland, Scottish, and Eastern / North Eastern regions had six seats per compartment in 2nd class, with fold-up arm-rests which folded into the seat-back, while those built to Diagram 128 for the Southern and Western regions, with their heavy commuter loadings into London, had eight seats in each 2nd class compartment, and no arm-rests. 2nd class seating was of the interior sprung bench type.

All first class compartments sat six passengers, with folding arm rests which lifted into cushion dividers between the seats, using a lower bench with six individual square cushions on top for greater comfort.

In later years, as vehicles were re-allocated between regions, some had their arm-rests fixed in the folded position while on the Western region.

The Mark 1 CK was as common as coaches comprising all standard class (SK), with both types outnumbering all first class (FK) coaches. There was also a Brake Composite Corridor or BCK, but this was not as common.

No coaches of this type are still in daily use on the main line network, since open saloon coaches are now preferred by operating companies. Some do still run on heritage lines, as indicated in the picture of 16071 at the Llangollen Railway above, with the North Yorkshire Moors Railway registering three examples, 15745, 16156 and 16191, for use on the Esk Valley Line between Whitby and Battersby, 16191 being the most recent of these having received a full overhaul during 2017.

== See also ==
- Corridor coach
