= First Corridor =

British Rail Corridor First
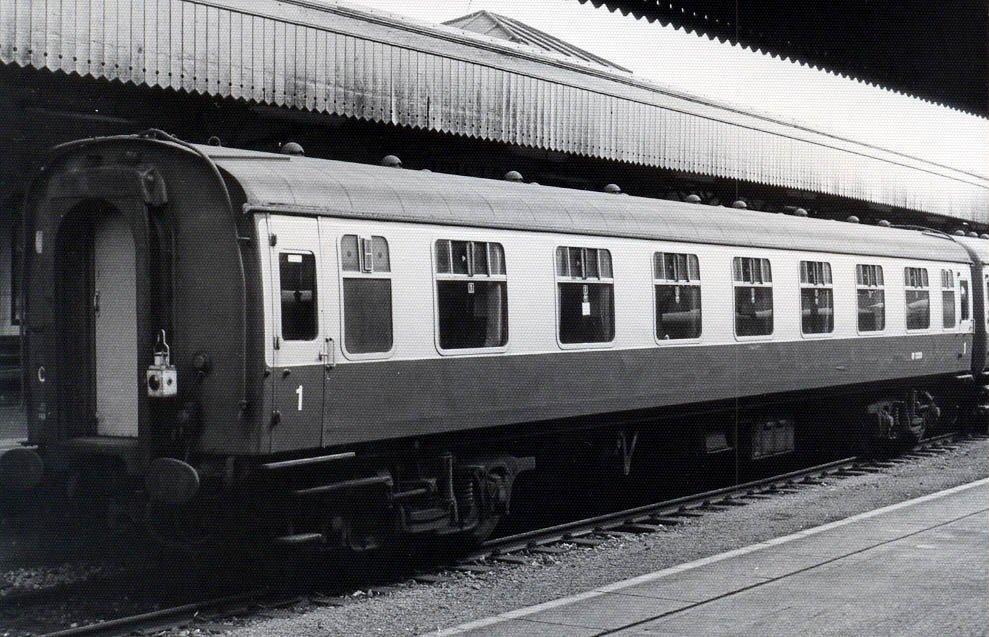
- A Mk1 FK in Blue and grey livery pictured at Bristol Temple Meads on 5 May 1984
- In service: 1951–
- Manufacturer: British Railways
- Built at: Ashford Works, Swindon Works, Derby Carriage and Wagon Works
- Family name: Mark 1 and Mark 2, 2A, 2B, 2C and 2D
- Constructed: 1951–1972
- Number built: FK: 611, BFK: 173
- Fleet numbers: FK: 13000–13610, BFK: 14000–14172
- Capacity: FK: 42 (7 compartments of 6 seats); BFK: 24 (4 compartments of 6 seats)
- Operators: British Rail

Specifications
- Car length: 64 ft 6 in (19.66 m)
- Width: 9 ft 3 in (2.82 m)
- Height: 12 ft 9 1/2 in (3.90 m)
- Maximum speed: 90–100 mph (145–161 km/h)
- Weight: 31 to 36 long tons (31 to 37 t; 35 to 40 short tons)
- Bogies: BR1, Commonwealth or B4
- Braking system(s): Vacuum, Air or both
- Track gauge: 4 ft 8 1/2 in (1,435 mm) standard gauge

The Corridor First type of railway coach was one of the standard mid-20th century designs; coded 'FK' by the LNER and BR, and 'CL' by the LMS. The layout of the coach was a number of compartments, all of which were first class, linked by a side corridor. The British Railways produced versions (of Mark 1 and Mark 2 variations up to Mark 2D inclusive) were numbered in the 13xxx series. The prototype Mark 2 carriage, number 13252, was of FK design. It is now preserved at the Mid-Norfolk Railway, having been preserved by (now formerly part of) the National Collection.

A number of the Mark 2A/2B/2C carriages were declassified in 1985 to become Standard Corridors (coded SK). They were renumbered from 13xxx to 19xxx, putting them after the end of the 'Mark 1' range (19452–19560).

No carriages of this type are still in daily use on the main line network, since open saloon carriages are now preferred by operating companies. However, some electric multiple units based on British Rail coaches have first class compartments. As of 22 May 2010 there are no more Mark 1-based class units in use (the last journey was on the train which left Lymington Pier on Saturday 22 May 2010 at 22:14 BST). Hastings Diesels Limited has some such coaches forming part of their preserved main line Class 201/202 and many FKs still operate in charter trains, and they remain popular on preserved railway lines.

== Gallery ==
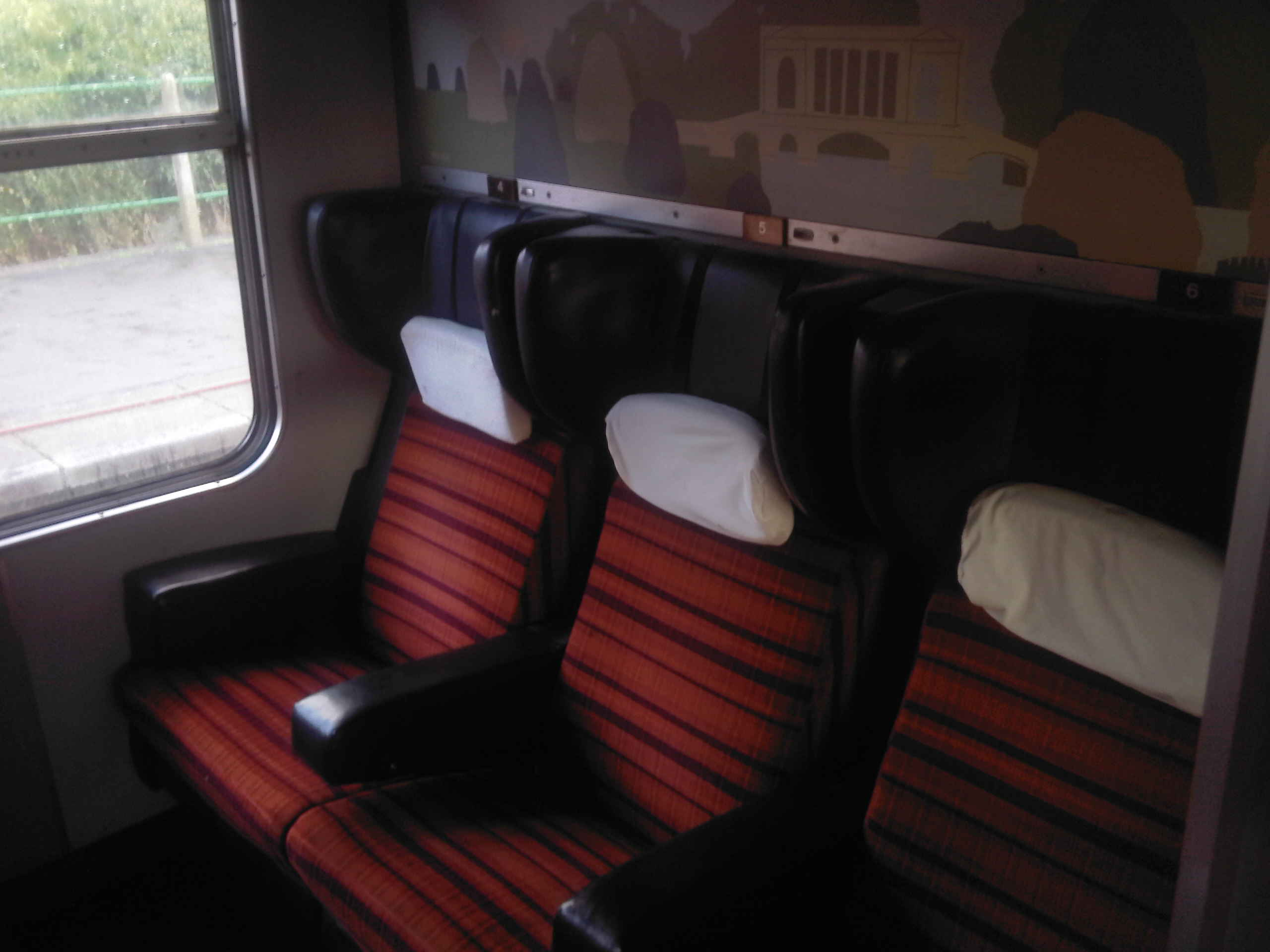
Interior detail of a Mark 2A FK compartment

== Orders ==
Lot No.	Diagram	Mark	Built	Builder	Qty	Fleet numbers	Notes
30019	-	1	1951	Swindon	33	13000–13032	BR1 bogies
30052	-	1	1952	Eastleigh	3	13033–13035	BR1 bogies
30019	-	1	1952	Swindon	24	13036–13059	BR1 bogies
30027	-	1	1952	Swindon	5	13060-13064	BR1 bogies
30065	-	1	1953	Swindon	12	13065–13076	BR1 bogies
30089	-	1	1954	Swindon	22	13085–13107	BR1 bogies
30107	-	1	1954	Swindon	18	13108–13125	BR1 bogies
30147	-	1	1955	Swindon	59	13126–13184	BR1 bogies
30217	-	1	1957-9	Ashford / Swindon	35	13185–13219	BR1 bogies
30357	-	1	1957	GRCW	1	13221	BR1 bogies
30381	-	1	1959	Ashford / Swindon	16	13223-13238	B4 bogies
30432	-	1	1959	Ashford / Swindon	13	13239-13251	BR1 bogies
30550	-	2	1963	Swindon	1	13252	B4 bogies
30578	-	1	1960	Metro Cammell	50	13253-13302	B4 bogies
30667	-	1	1962	Swindon	58	13303-13360	CW bogies
30733	-	2	1964	Derby	18	13361-13378	B4 bogies
30734	-	2	1964	Derby	28	13379-13406	B4 bogies
30738	-	XP64	1964	Derby	3	13407-13409	B4 bogies
30749	-	2	1964-65	Derby	22	13410-13431	B4 bogies
30750	-	2	1964	Derby	2	13432-13433	B4 bogies
30774	-	2a	1968	Derby	30	13434-13463	B4 bogies
30785	-	2a	1968	Derby	22	13464-13475	B4 bogies
30789	-	2b	1969	Derby	38	13476-13513	B4 bogies
30797	-	2c	1969-70	Derby	48	13514-13561	B4 bogies
30825	-	2d	1971-72	Derby	49	13562-13610	B4 bogies

== See also ==
- Corridor coach
