= Covered carriage truck =

Rail vehicle with end doors

British Rail covered carriage truck
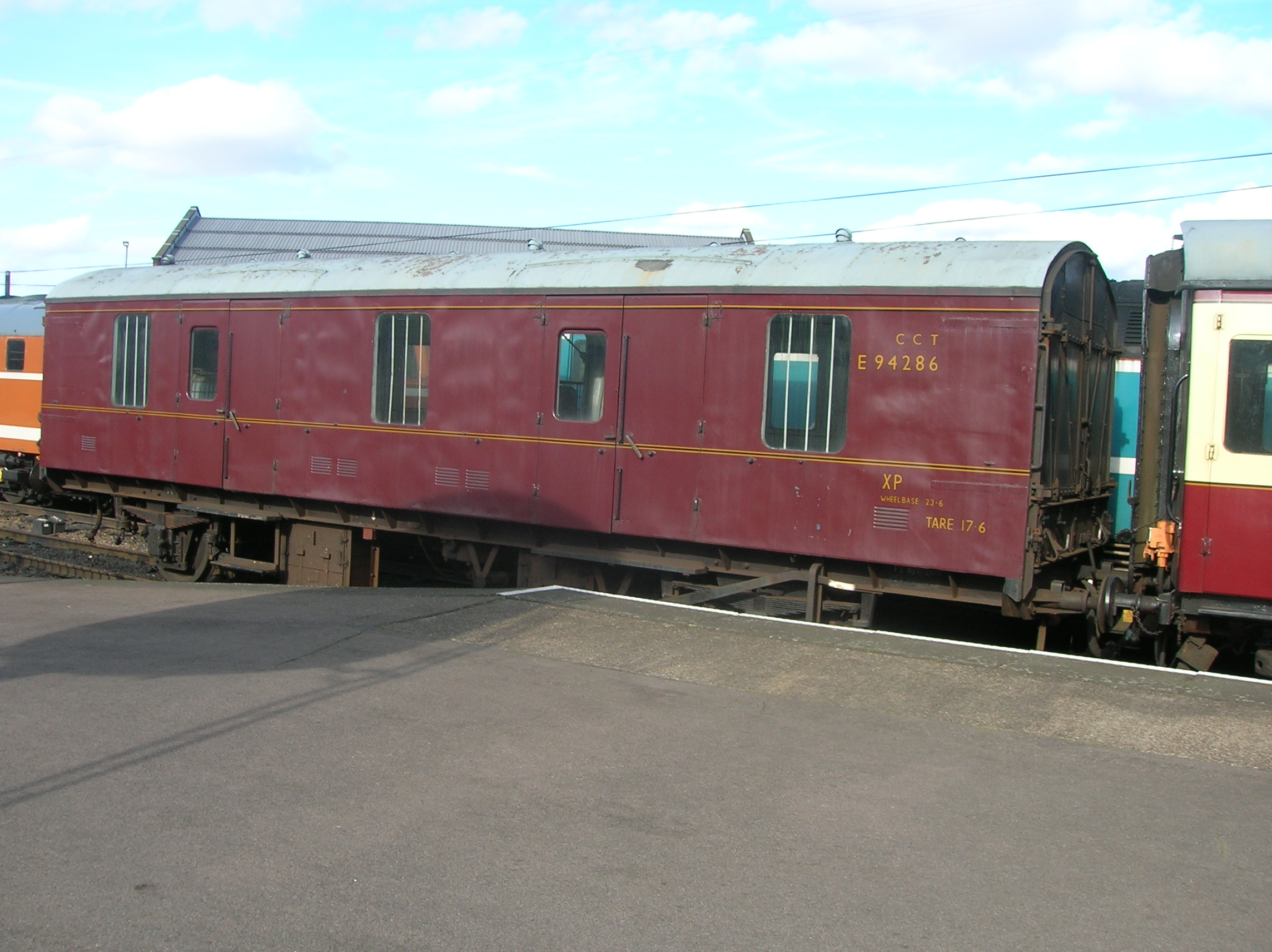
- CCT No. 94286 preserved on the Great Central Railway
- In service: 1959–mid-1980s
- Manufacturer: BR Doncaster Works, BR Earlestown Works
- Family name: British Railways Mark 1
- Constructed: 1959-1961
- Number built: 827
- Fleet numbers: 94100–94922, 96200–96203
- Capacity: 10 tonnes (9.8 long tons; 11.0 short tons)
- Operators: British Rail

Specifications
- Car length: 37 ft 0 in (11.28 m)
- Width: 8 ft 9 in (2.67 m)
- Height: 12 ft 6 in (3.81 m)
- Maximum speed: 70 mph (113 km/h)
- Weight: 17 tonnes (16.7 long tons; 18.7 short tons)
- Track gauge: 4 ft 8 1/2 in (1,435 mm)

Covered Carriage Truck was a type of railway van with end doors used for moving motor cars or parcel traffic. Four wheeled CCT were banned from Motorail services in the mid-1960s. These vans were designed to be used for carrying motor cars in Motorail but the tight clearances inside the body of the van and closing/opening of the end doors required much time and effort from staff. The vans were replaced by general utility vans (GUV) and car flats.

British Rail's Earlestown Works built 822 four-wheeled Covered Carriage Trucks; these were preceded by a prototype, number 94100, built at Doncaster. In addition, Doncaster Works rebuilt four former LNER passenger coaches as prototype bogie CCTs numbered 96200–96203.

== Early years ==
From the early days of railways, such as the Liverpool and Manchester Railway of 1830 road coaches were carried on flat waggons. This is illustrated in the Royal Mail 12 penny postage stamp of 1980. These were called "carriage trucks" but would later be called "open carriage trucks". The earliest open carriage trucks were basically flat waggons with fixtures for attaching ropes and chains. Covered-carriage trucks came later.
