= Post Office sorting van =

Postal railcar in the United Kingdom

British Rail Post Office sorting van
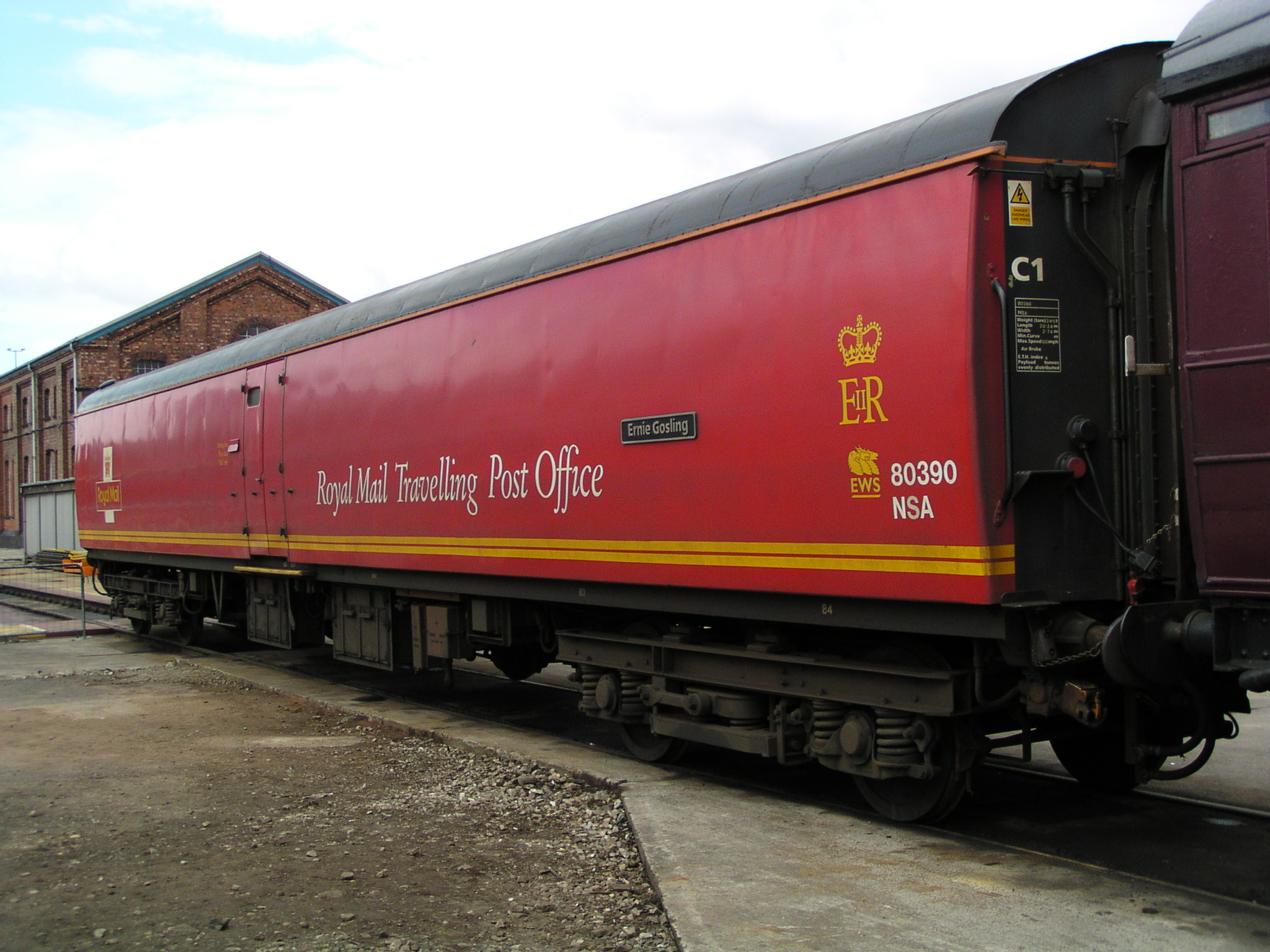
- NSA 80390 "Ernie Gosling" on display at Doncaster Works open day on 27 July 2003. This vehicle was operated by EWS country-wide in the consist of TPO mail trains
- In service: 1959–2004
- Manufacturer: BR Wolverton & York
- Family name: British Railways Mark 1
- Constructed: 1959, 1961, 1968–69, 1972–73, 1977
- Number built: 81 (new), 15 (converted from SK)
- Operators: British Rail

Specifications
- Car length: 64 ft 6 in (19.66 m)
- Width: 9 ft 3 in (2.82 m)
- Height: 12 ft 9 1/2 in (3.90 m)
- Maximum speed: 90–100 mph (145–161 km/h)
- Weight: 35–39 tonnes (34.4–38.4 long tons; 38.6–43.0 short tons)
- HVAC: Dual heat (steam and electric), ETH 3 or 4
- Bogies: BR2 or B5
- Braking system(s): 1959–61 stock: Vacuum, 1968–77 stock: Dual (Air and Vacuum)
- Track gauge: 4 ft 8 1/2 in (1,435 mm)

A Post Office sorting van is a type of rail vehicle built for use in a Travelling Post Office.

British Rail built ninety-six of these vehicles between 1959 and 1977, to several similar designs, all based on the Mark 1 coach design. They were numbered in the range 80300–80395. The earliest vehicles built featured catching nets and collection arms, to allow mail bags to be exchanged without the train needing to stop, a practice which continued until 1971. Following the Great Train Robbery, vehicles from 80319 onwards featured a revised design with smaller windows.

In the early 1970s, British Rail introduced the TOPS classification system. Vehicles were given the TOPS code NS, followed by an A if they were air-braked, V if vacuum-braked, or an X if they had both air and vacuum brakes.

== Preservation ==
Several sorting vehicles have been preserved, including examples from most of the big four companies, as well as some from even earlier. There are also several BR Mark 1 vehicles in preservation, including the first-built vehicle, no. 80300; the last vehicle built with large windows, no. 80318; and the final vehicle overhauled by EWS, no. 80382. The complete list is shown below:

British Rail Mk1 TPO sorting vehicles:

Number	TOPS Code	Name	Built	Location	Notes
80300	NSX	-	1959 Wolverton	Severn Valley Railway	First-built vehicle.
80301	NSX	-	1959 Wolverton	Great Central Railway	
80307	NSX	-	1959 Wolverton	Great Central Railway	
80318	NSX	-	1961 Wolverton	Colne Valley Railway	Last vehicle built with large windows.
80327	NSA	George James	1969 York	Nene Valley Railway	
80328	NSA		1969 York	Severn Valley Railway	Used as Santa's Grotto at Arley during December, kept in Kidderminster Carriage Shed for rest of year.
80329	NSA		1969 York	Severn Valley Railway	Used as Santa's Grotto at Arley during December, kept in Kidderminster Carriage Shed for rest of year.
80334	NSA		1969 York	Rushden, Higham & Wellingborough Railway	
80337	NSA	Brian White	1969 York	Nene Valley Railway	
80345	NSA	Richard Yeo	1969 York	Great Central Railway	
80349	NSA	-	1969 York	Great Central Railway	
80371	NSA		1973 York	Gwili Railway	
80374	NSA	-	1973 York	Battlefield Line Railway	
80382	NSA		1977 Wolverton	Bo'ness and Kinneil Railway	Rebuilt from SK 25109. Last vehicle ever overhauled by EWS.
80394	NSA		1977 Wolverton	Buckinghamshire Railway Centre	Rebuilt from SK 25156.

Pre-nationalisation design TPO sorting vehicles:

Number	Company	Built	Location	Notes
70294	LNER	1937 York	Great Central Railway	Only surviving LNER TPO.
30225	LMS	1939 Wolverton	Midland Railway - Butterley	
30272	LMS	1949 Wolverton	Nene Valley Railway	Formerly in National Collection. Last surviving vehicle from Great Train Robbery set.
4920	Southern	1939 Eastleigh	Nene Valley Railway	Formerly in National Collection.
4922	Southern	1939 Eastleigh	Bluebell Railway	
814	GWR	1940 Swindon	Didcot Railway Centre	

Pre-grouping TPO sorting vehicles:

Number	Company	Built	Location	Notes
2178	GNR	1885 Doncaster	Nene Valley Railway	Only surviving GNR TPO. Six-wheeled.
599	GWR	1889 Swindon	St Germans	Only surviving broad-gauge TPO vehicle.
20	LNWR	1909 Wolverton	Crewe Heritage Centre	Later LMS 30244.
186	WCJS	1883 Wolverton	National Railway Museum	Later LMS 30384.
