= Post Office stowage van =

UK rolling stock class

British Rail Post Office stowage van
- In service: 1959–2004
- Manufacturers: BR Wolverton & York
- Family name: British Railways Mark 1
- Number built: 19 (new), 21 (converted)
- Fleet numbers: 80400–80439
- Operator: British Rail(ways)

Specifications
- Car length: 64 ft 6 in (19.66 m)
- Width: 9 ft 3 in (2.82 m)
- Height: 12 ft 9 1/2 in (3.90 m)
- Maximum speed: 90–100 mph (145–161 km/h)
- Weight: 34–35 tonnes (33.5–34.4 long tons; 37.5–38.6 short tons)
- HVAC: Dual heat (steam and electric), ETH 3 or 4
- Bogies: BR2 or B5
- Braking systems: Vacuum or Dual (Air & Vacuum)
- Track gauge: 4 ft 8 1/2 in (1,435 mm)

A Post Office stowage van is a type of rail vehicle built for use in a travelling post office (TPO). Several of these have passed into preservation as they are very useful for storage on the railways.

== Preservation ==
The preserved stowage vehicles are as follows:

Preserved BR Mk1 TPO Stowage Vehicles
Number	TOPS Code	Built	Location	Notes
80401	NTA	1959 Wolverton	Great Central Railway	Originally fitted with collection nets.
80402	NTA	1959 Wolverton	Nene Valley Railway	Originally fitted with collection nets.
80411	NTA	1966 York	Gloucestershire Warwickshire Railway	Rebuilt from BSK 35003.
80413	NTA	1966 York	Rushden, Higham and Wellingborough Railway	Rebuilt from BSK 35004.
80417	NTA	1968 York	Nene Valley Railway	
80423	NTA	1968 York	Buckinghamshire Railway Centre	
80429	NTA	1973 York	Colne Valley Railway	
80433	NTA	1976 Wolverton	Strathspey Railway	Rebuilt from SK 25150.
80435	NTA	1976 Wolverton	Gloucestershire Warwickshire Railway	Rebuilt from SK 25117.
80437	NTA	1976 Wolverton	Bo'ness and Kinneil Railway	Rebuilt from SK 25068.
80438	NTA	1976 Wolverton	Great Central Railway	Rebuilt from SK 25139.

In addition, 80421 was also purchased for preservation by the Embsay and Bolton Abbey Steam Railway, but was scrapped in July 2008.

Pre-Nationalisation TPO Stowage Vehicles:

Number	Company	Built	Location	Notes
70268	LNER	1931 Dunkinfield	Great Central Railway	Converted from Pigeon Van in 1950.
4958	Southern	1939 Ashford	Pontypool and Blaenavon Railway	In use as C&W store.
