= BSK =

BSK is a three-letter abbreviation that may refer to:

== Sports ==
- OFK Beograd, Serbian football club
- FK BSK Borča, Serbian football club
- FK BSK Batajnica, Serbian football club
- FK BSK Banja Luka, Bosnian-Herzegovinian football club
- FK BSK Ledinci, Bosnian-Herzegovinian football club
- BSK Saint Petersburg, a former Russian bandy club
- Biratnagar Super Kings, a franchise cricket team

== Other uses ==
- Banashankari, a neighborhood in Bangalore, India
- Basingstoke railway station, station code
- Brake Standard Corridor, a railway coach type in the U.K.
- The British School of Kuwait
- Brödraskapet, a Swedish prison gang
- BSK Defense, a Greek manufacturer of aerial target and aerial observation products
- BSk, cold semi-arid climate
- BSK Jr. books, in the Bailey School Kids series
- Burushaski (ISO 639:bsk), a language spoken by Burusho people in Pakistan and India
- Bone Street Krew, a professional wrestling group
