= London Underground coaching stock =

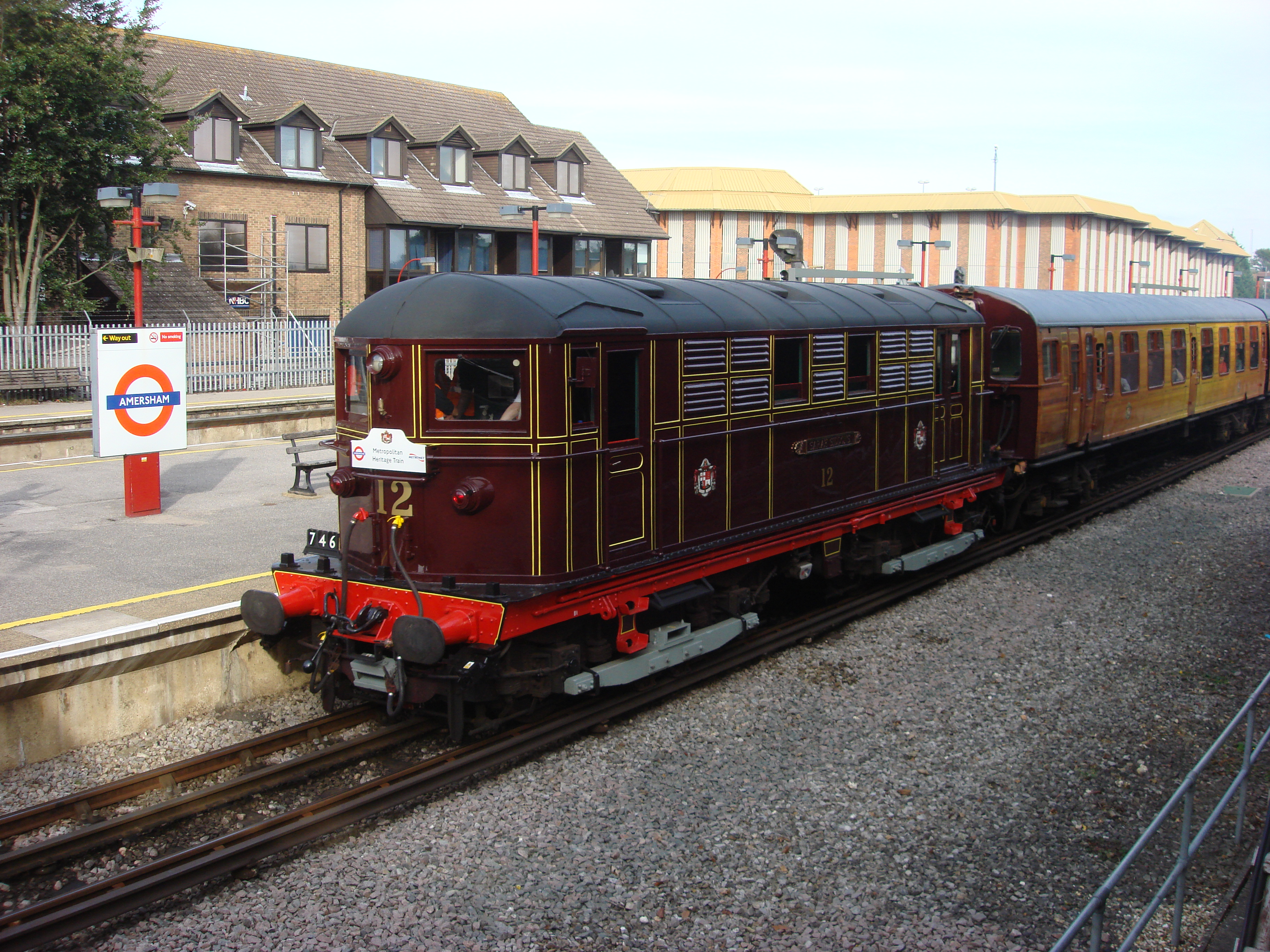
- Sarah Siddons with a rake of four 4TC coaches and one Mk1 coach at Amersham
- Stock type: Deep-level tube

The London Underground coaching stock is the coaching stock of the London Underground in London, United Kingdom. They were bought for the 'Steam on the Met' events from 1989 - 2000, and the remaining stock are used for special events.

== History ==
In 1989, the first 'Steam on the Met' event took place, and London Underground, hired British Rail coaching stock for the excursions. It was found that it was actually cheaper to buy the coaches instead of hiring them. Thus, London Underground has acquired numerous former British Rail coaching stock for these special excursion trains on the Metropolitan line, usually hauled by either steam locomotives, or the preserved electric locomotive No. 12 "Sarah Siddons".

The fleet consisted of several Mark 1 and Mark 2 vehicles, and eight former British Rail Class 438 electrical multiple unit trailer set vehicles. The two coaches bought in the late 1980s were initially painted in red, white and blue of LUL. After the acquisition of more coaches in 1992, all vehicles were painted in the maroon livery of the Metropolitan Railway. They were normally based at West Ruislip depot.

Even though the last 'Steam on the Met' event took place in 2000, the fleet remained in use until 2003, when all vehicles were stored. In 2005, Metronet decided to dispose of its coaching stock. The Mark 2 vehicles and one four-car trailer set have been sold for preservation, and the rest remained advertised for sale. However, after the refurbishment of 'Sarah Siddons' by Metronet in 2007, the remaining coaching stock is now being used on occasional specials with the Met loco. They are now painted in London Transport Maroon.

== Vehicles ==
The full list of vehicles is given below.

Key:	In service	Preserved

=== Trailer control units ===
These are former Class 438 4TC vehicles, and were purchased in 1992.

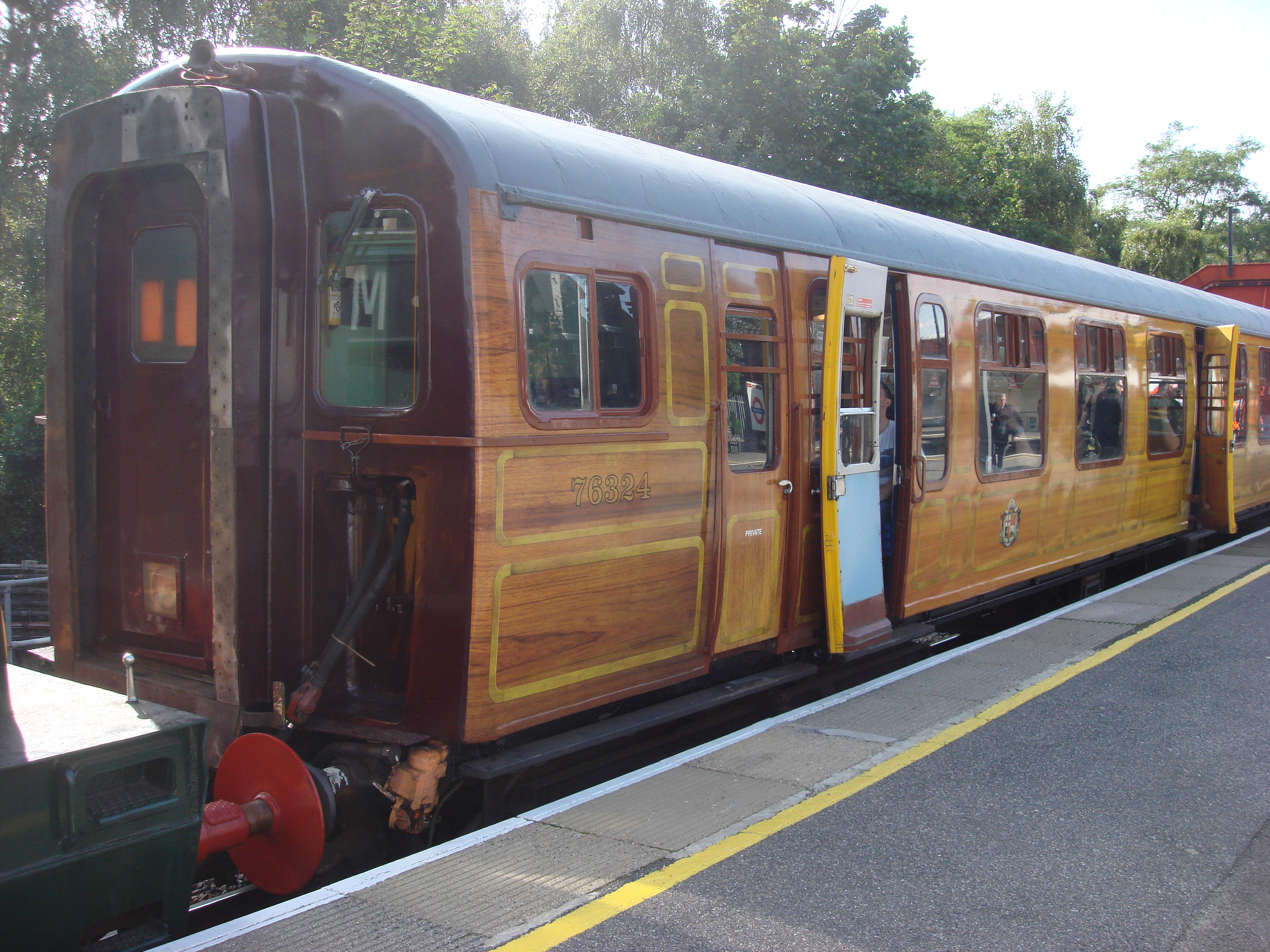
Trailer control unit number 76324 seen here at Amersham station

Number	Unit number	Vehicle type	Year acquired	Year withdrawn	Year sold	Notes
70823	8012	TBSK	1992	-	-	-
70824	8013	TBSK	1992	2003	2005	Sold for preservation
70855	8012	TFK	1992	2003	2005	Sold for preservation
71163	8030	TFK	1992	-	-	-
76297	8015	DTSO	1992	-	-	-
76298	8015	DTSO	1992	2003	2005	Sold for preservation
76322	8027	DTSO	1992	2003	2005	Sold for preservation
76324	8028	DTSO	1992	-	-	-

Between 1992 and 2003, one vehicle, TFK no. 70855 was used as a support coach for locomotives. The remaining seven vehicles were marshalled into two coaching sets. The three-car unit was formed of 76298+70823+76322, whilst the four-car unit was formed of 76297+70824+71163+76324.

=== Coaches ===
These vehicles were used as standard locomotive-hauled coaching stock. Mark 1 BSK 35011 and Mark 2 3152, prior to purchase by London Underground, were used as brake force runners, and numbered 977588 and 977547 respectively.

Number	Vehicle type		Year built	Year acquired	Year withdrawn	Year sold	Notes
3152	Mk.2C	FO	1969	1989	2003	2005	Sold for preservation
5458	Mk.2B	TSO	1969	1995	2003	2005	Preserved at Didcot Railway Centre
5495	Mk.2B	TSO	1971	1995	2003	2005	Preserved at Didcot Railway Centre
5497	Mk.2B	TSO	1971	1995	2003	2005	Preserved on Mid-Norfolk Railway
35011	Mk.1	BSK	1957	1988	-	-	-
