= Krasnaya Zarya Leningrad =

Krasnaya Zarya Leningrad was the previous name of two sports clubs in Saint Petersburg, Russia:

- BSK Saint Petersburg, bandy club
- FC Elektrosila Leningrad, football club
