= British Rail Class 438 =

Unpowered train carriage class (1966–1989)

British Rail Class 438 (4-TC)
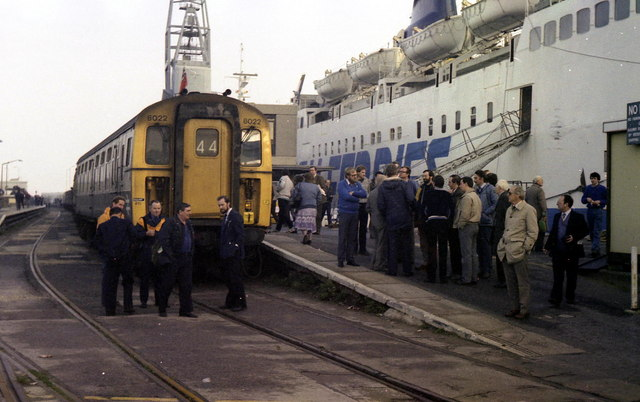
- Class 438 unit at Weymouth Quay
- In service: 1966–1989
- Manufacturer: Holgate Road carriage works
- Family name: BR Mark 1 EMU
- Constructed: 1966–1967, 1974 (converted)
- Number built: 34 sets, 1 spare DTSO
- Formation: 4 car sets - DTSO-TFK-TBSK-DTSO
- Fleet numbers: 401–434, later 8001–8034
- Capacity: 42 First, 160 Standard
- Operators: British Rail
- Depots: Bournemouth TMD

Specifications
- Car length: DTSO: 19.70 m (64 ft 8 in); TFK/TBSK: 19.65 m (64 ft 6 in)
- Width: 2.82 m (9 ft 3 in)
- Maximum speed: 90 mph (145 km/h)
- Weight: DTSO: 32.5 tonnes (32.0 long tons; 35.8 short tons); TFK: 35.4 tonnes (34.8 long tons; 39.0 short tons); TBSK: 33.6 tonnes (33.1 long tons; 37.0 short tons); Total: 134 tonnes (132 long tons; 148 short tons)
- HVAC: Electric train heating
- Bogies: B5
- Braking system(s): Air (EP/Auto)
- Safety system(s): AWS
- Track gauge: 4 ft 8 1/2 in (1,435 mm) standard gauge

The British Rail TC (Trailer Control) multiple units were unpowered fixed formations of 3 or 4 carriages with a driving position at each end of the set, converted by BR's Holgate Road carriage works from locomotive-hauled Mark 1 carriages in 1966–1967 and 1974. The units built on experience gained from the prototype 6TC unit. In time the 3 car units (3TC, numbered in the series 3xx) were reformed into four car units (4TC numbered in the series 4xx) to match the rest of the fleet and later classified as Class 442. This was later changed to Class 491, under which they spent the majority of their working lives. Shortly before withdrawal they were reclassified Class 438 and the units were renumbered to 8001-8034.

== Operation ==
The units were primarily employed on services between London Waterloo and Weymouth. One or two 4TC units would be propelled from London to Bournemouth by a 3,200 hp (2,386 kW) 4REP unit, controlled from the leading cab. At Bournemouth, one or both 4TCs would continue over the then unelectrified line to Weymouth, hauled by a Class 33/1 diesel locomotive, leaving the 4REP at the London end of Bournemouth station. Up trains from Weymouth would follow the same procedure in reverse: the Class 33/1 locomotive would propel its train to Bournemouth (controlled from the 4TC leading cab). There the 4TC/s would couple to the waiting 4REP which would then power the whole formation to London, leaving the Class 33/1 locomotive at Bournemouth to await the next such service. 4TC units were occasionally seen on other duties such as Waterloo to Salisbury, the Clapham Junction to Kensington Olympia shuttle before that line was electrified and surplus units were also used on Sundays to operate Portsmouth Harbour to Reading direct services during the late 1970s & early 1980s. They were pressed into general service as needed, often deputising for electric trains when the power was switched off and occasionally on inter-regional Southern Region services. They ventured further afield on special duties or rail-tours, including Birmingham, Cardiff, Barnstaple/Meeth & Meldon Quarry. Until the closure of the Swanage branch, a small number of through 4TC workings to/from Waterloo were operated, also using class 33/1 locomotives in similar style to the Weymouth trains.

The spare driving trailer second open (DTSO) number 76331 was equipped with an 'updated' interior - the seats were replaced with Inter-City style individual bucket seats (as used in the contemporary Mk2A/B/C carriages) and fluorescent lighting to match. This modified car was then placed into unit 417 from the early 1970s, and the displaced 76302 was kept spare at Bournemouth Traction Maintenance Depot. No general refurbishment was ever undertaken on the units (see below regarding the work undertaken on 76327) and most of them ran with their original incandescent lighting until withdrawal. A feature of a journey in a 2x4TC/4REP train with the 4REP pushing, was severe jolting at station restarts; this upset many a hot drink over the years. This was particularly prevalent at stations on a descending gradient such as New Milton in the down direction. There would be sometimes several jolts of varying intensity until the couplings were fully compressed. The Units were fitted with a motor-generator set for lighting supply and a single compressor; these drew power from the REP or loco through the ETH jumpers.

In 1986, two 4TC sets were temporarily converted to 4TCB (Trailer Control Buffet) by removing the TFK coaches and inserting buffet coaches from withdrawn 4REP units. They were designated as the class 492/8 and numbered set 802 and 807. This was in part to compensate for the loss of the Buffet in TC+REP formations as those units were withdrawn over a period of time for scrapping to give up their traction equipment for the new Mk3 based Wessex Electrics.

In December 1987, the two 4TCB sets and four other 4TC sets were converted to 4TCT (Trailer Control Trolley) sets. The buffet coaches in the 4TCB sets and TFK coaches in 4TC sets were replaced with TFK coaches from redundant 4TC sets modified to take catering trolleys. They were designated the class 438/1 and numbered sets 101-106.

Following the withdrawal of the 4REP units, three temporary 5TCB sets were formed in 1988 by inserting REP buffet cars into 4TC sets. They were also designated as the class 492/8 and numbered sets 804, 807 and 809.

On occasion, class 33/0 locomotives were substituted for unavailable 33/1s; in this event the loco had to run-round at Weymouth and the starting bell Loudaphone inter-carriage telephone system could not be used, the guard having to resort to the use of a green flag to start the train at station stops.

At the time that the Clapham Junction - Kensington Olympia service was being run by Network South East with Class 73 traction DTSO number 76327 was part equipped with a modernised interior. The driving end was fitted with 4CEP style windows, ceiling (with fluorescent lights and luggage racks but with 3+2 Class 319 seating.

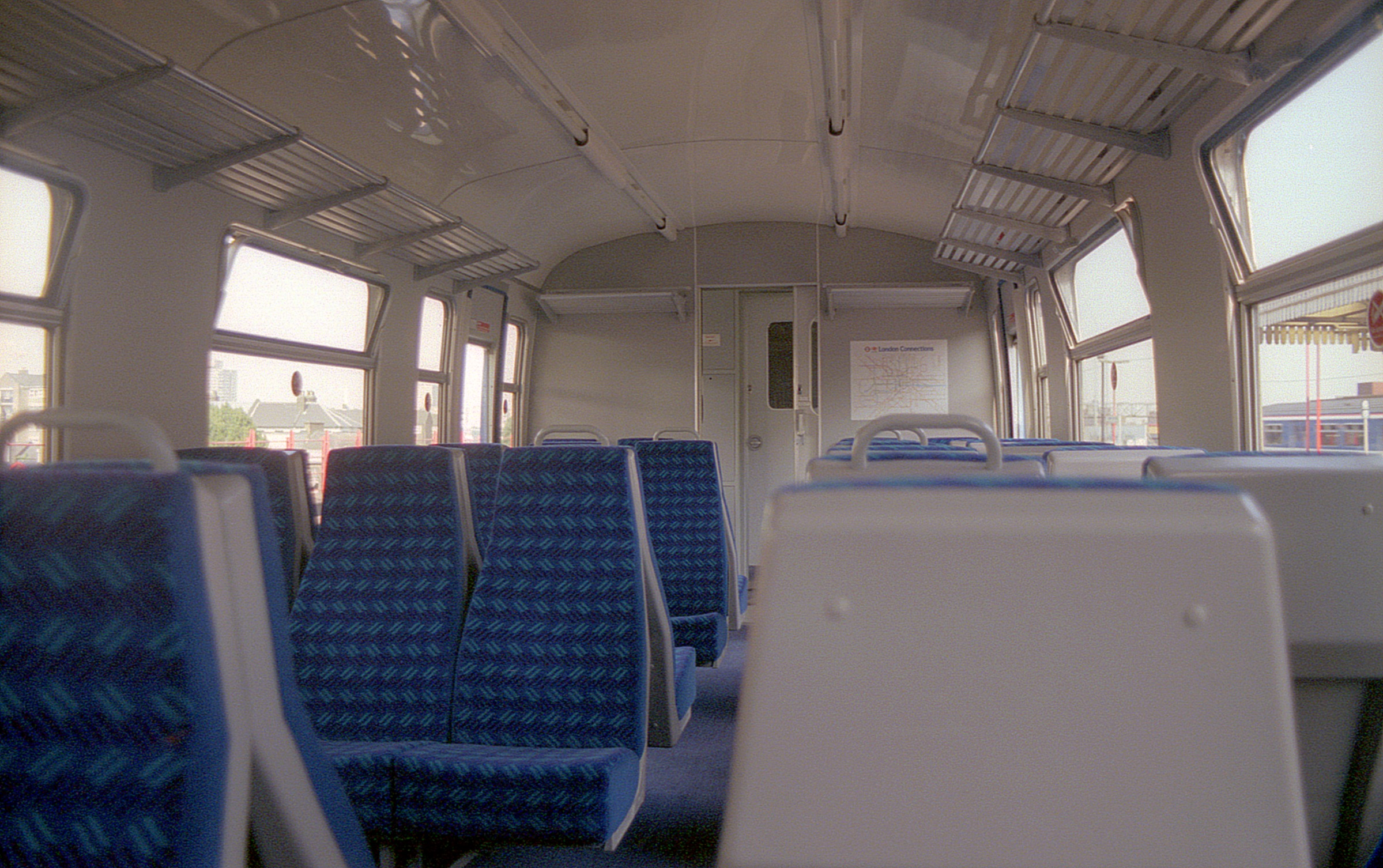
Interior of refurbished end of 4TC coach 76327

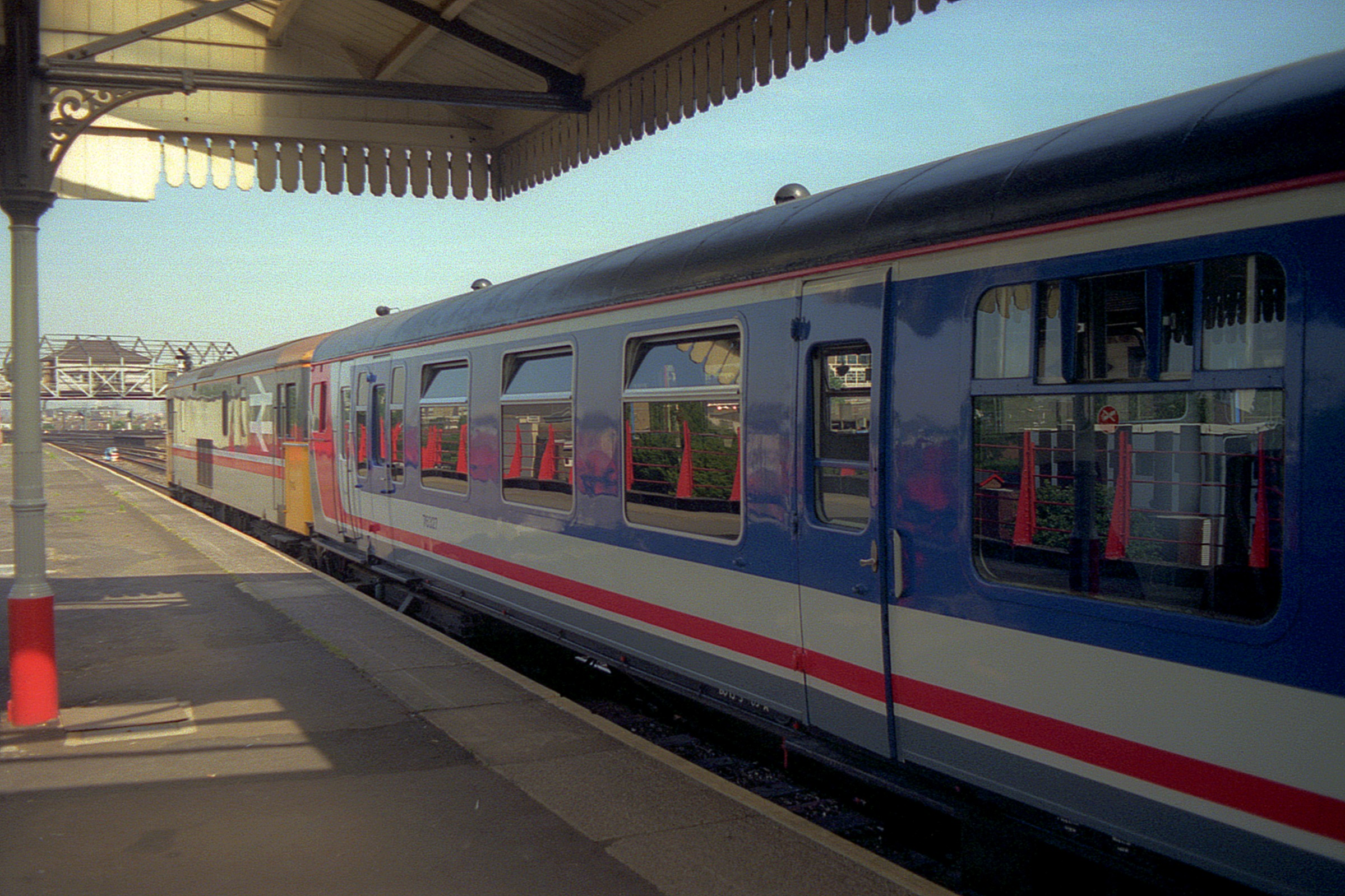
A BR Class 73 in Intercity livery with part refurbished 4TC in Network SouthEast livery at Clapham Junction showing one window of non-refurbished section.

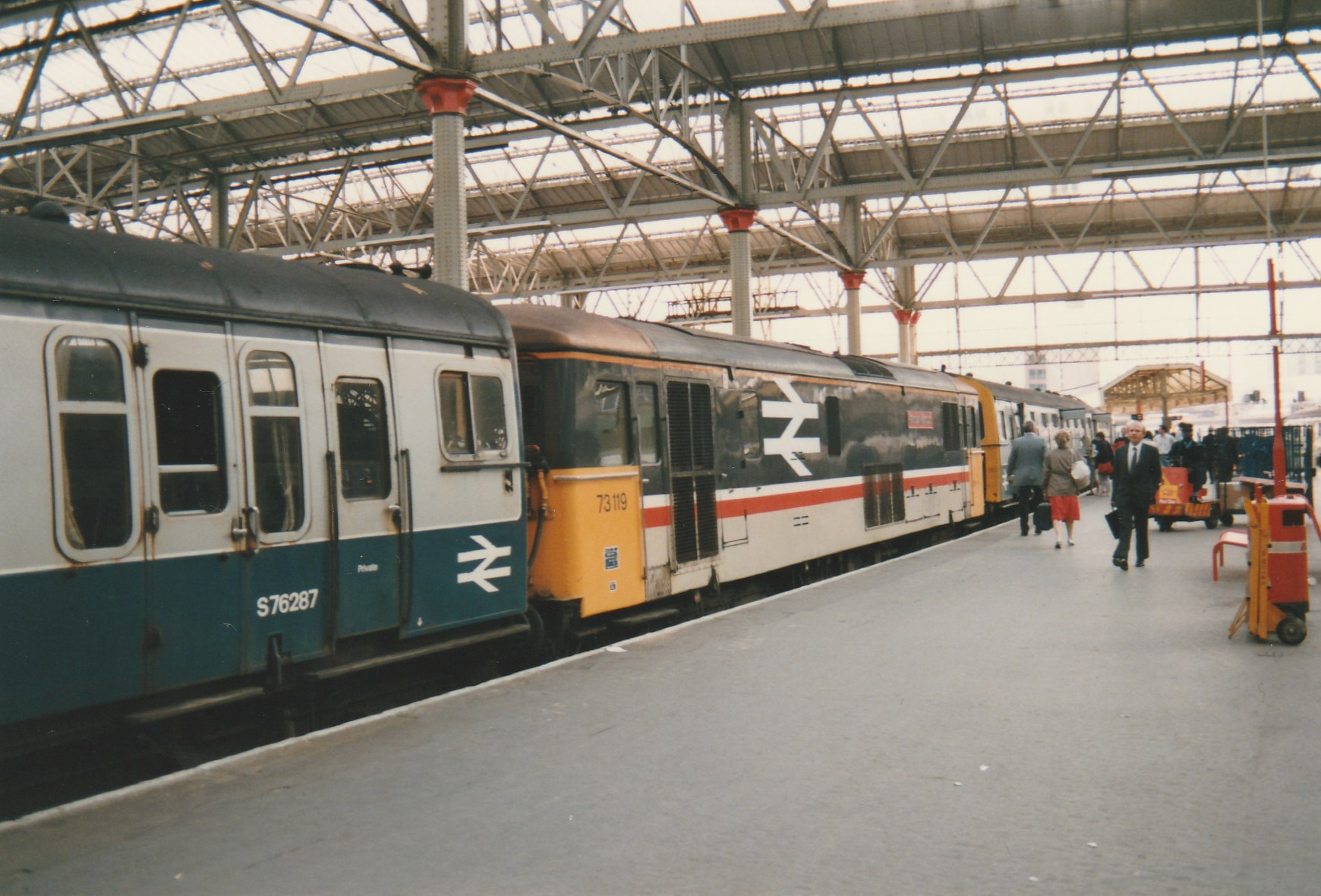
The flexibility of the 4-TC concept is illustrated here, as 73119 'Kentish Mercury' is providing the power whilst coupled to a 4-TC at each end.

== Accidents and incidents ==
- On 25 February 1979, 4TC unit No. 414 formed a passenger train that was hauled by Class 33 locomotive 33 115. The train was in collision with an engineering train near Hilsea, Hampshire. The crane in the engineering train was foul of the adjacent line, and a side-long collision occurred, severely damaging the locomotive and damaging all four carriages. One person was killed and nine were injured.
- On 12 December 1988, a train comprising 4REP unit 2003 coupled to 4TC units 8015 and 8027 formed the 06:14 Poole - Waterloo service, which ran into the rear of the 07:18 Basingstoke - Waterloo train, formed of 4VEP units 3033, 3119 and 3005 at Clapham Junction. The two trains derailed and collided with a third train, formed of 4VEP units 3004 and 3425 running in the opposite direction on an adjacent line. Thirty-five people were killed, 415 were injured.

== Description ==
The units were built in two batches. In the first batch, a total of 123 locomotive-hauled Mark 1 carriage were converted comprising 63 TSO to DTSO on Lot 30764, 32 BSK to TBSK on Lot 30765 and 28 FK to TFK on Lot 30766.

In the second batch, 14 locomotive-hauled carriages were rebuilt comprising 2 BSK to TBSK on Lot 30855, 6 FK to TFK on Lot 30856, and 6 TSO to DTSO on Lot 30857. This work included converting the three 3TC units to 4TC. The 1974 build units were fitted with double-glazed windows (except for the sliding toplights) as fitted to contemporary CIG/BIG stock. They also differed from the 1967 units in having the contemporary CIG/BIG style of seating throughout.

Individual vehicle numbering is shown in the table below.

Phase	Class	Type	Unit Nos.	DTSO	TFK	TBSK	DTSO
Phase 1 (1966–67)	491	4TC	401-428	76270, 76271-323 (odd)	70844-871	70812-839	76332, 76272-324 (even)
Phase 1 (1966–67)	492	3TC	301-303	76325-329 (odd)	-	70840-842	76326-330 (even)
Phase 1 (1966–67)	Spare			76311	-	70843	-
Phase 2 (1974)	491	4TC	429-431 (ex-3TC units)	-	71162-164	-	-
Phase 2 (1974)	491	4TC	432-434	76943-947 (odd)	71165-167	70843 (ex-spare), 71160-161	76944-948 (even)

== Further use ==
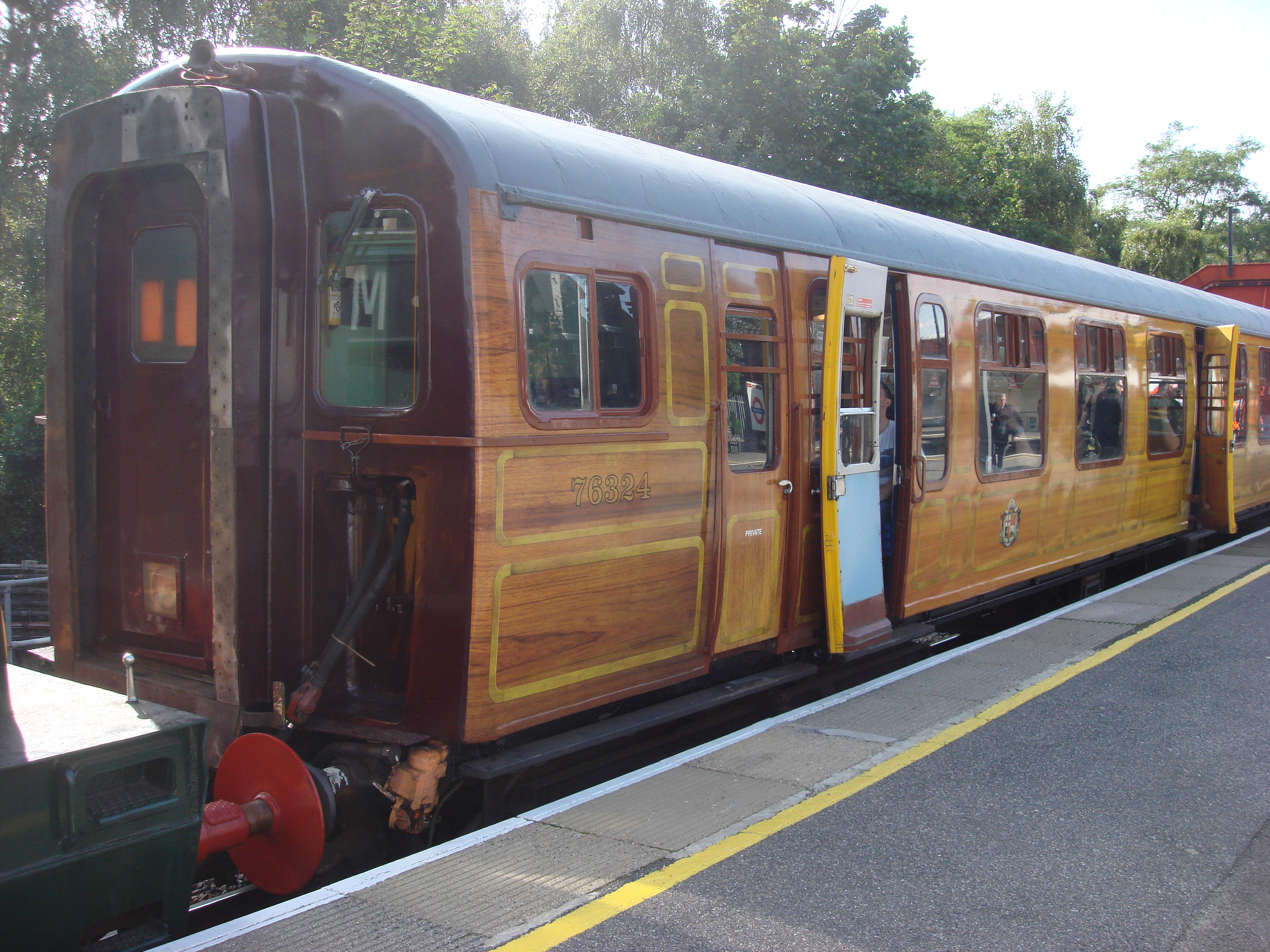
4TC vehicles in use on the Metropolitan line

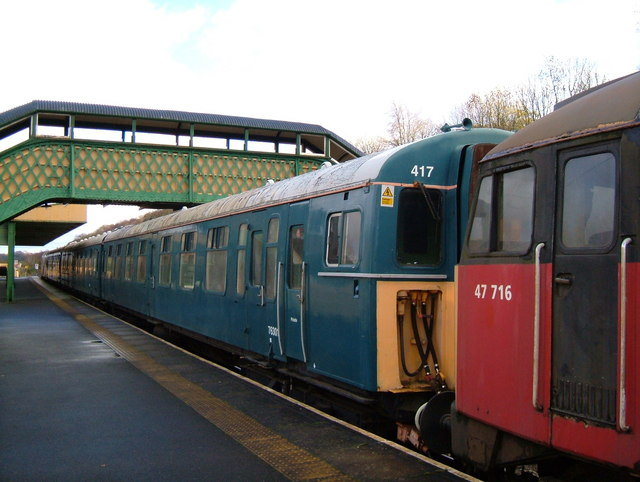
Unit 417 at Okehampton Station

Following withdrawal from passenger service, several vehicles were sold for further use with London Underground. They were used primarily for special excursions trains on the Metropolitan line, hauled by either steam locomotives, or the preserved electric locomotive No. 12 "Sarah Siddons".

Details of the vehicles sold to London Underground are given below. For further information, see London Underground coaching stock.

Unit Number			Type	Phase	DTSO	TFK	TBSK	DTSO
302	430	8030	4TC	Phase 2	-	71163	-	-
412	8012	-	4TC	Phase 1	-	70855	70823	-
413	8013	-	4TC	Phase 1	-	-	70824	-
415	8015	-	4TC	Phase 1	76297	-	-	76298
427	8027	-	4TC	Phase 1	76322	-	-	-
428	8028	-	4TC	Phase 1	76324	-	-	-

Six 4TC vehicles were formed into a test train in 1994 for use by Eurostar to test the third rail pick-ups for use by the Class 373 EMUs. This train consisted of two DTSOs, three TFKs and a TBSK, combined with a Class 73 locomotive and converted Class 33 Driving Van.

Preserved set 417, running with only three coaches, and preserved class 33/1 33103 were hired to Silverlink for a short time in August 1999 for use on the North London Line.

== Preservation ==
Two complete units and several other vehicles have been preserved. Unit no. 417 was one of the final two units in service with British Rail. The unit (highlighted pink) was one of two used by London Underground, and will ultimately be based on the Swanage Railway, And the unit 428 (highlighted blue) is used by London Underground on special charters.

DTSO 76275 was originally going to be used with Hastings Diesel Limited Class 201 but now belongs to the Swanage Railway Trust, and will now replace a DTSO currently in their set.

Details are given below.

Unit Number (current in bold)				Type	Phase	DTSO	TFK	TBSK	DTSO	Livery	Location	Notes
404	8004	3169	**3582**	4TC	Phase 1	76275	-	-	-	BR Blue and Grey	Swanage Railway	Operated in 4Vep unit 3169/3582 between 1992–2004. Has been sold to the Swanage Railway Trust to replace DTSO 76298 currently in their set.
405	8005	-	-	4TC	Phase 1	76277	-	-	-	Serco Railtest	Dartmoor Railway	Operated as DB 977335 in departmental service.
412	8012	**"413"**	-	4TC	Phase 1	-	70855	-	-	LT maroon	Swanage Railway	Operated by London Underground 1992–2003. Now owned by the Swanage Railway Trust. 70855 awaiting overhaul. 70824 undergoing overhaul. 76298 strategic spare, replaced by 76275. 76322 undergoing overhaul.
413	8013	**"413"**	-	4TC	Phase 1	-	-	70824	-	BR Blue and Grey	Swanage Railway	Operated by London Underground 1992–2003. Now owned by the Swanage Railway Trust. 70855 awaiting overhaul. 70824 undergoing overhaul. 76298 strategic spare, replaced by 76275. 76322 undergoing overhaul.
415	8015	**"413"**	-	4TC	Phase 1	76298	-	-	-	LT maroon	Swanage Railway	Operated by London Underground 1992–2003. Now owned by the Swanage Railway Trust. 70855 awaiting overhaul. 70824 undergoing overhaul. 76298 strategic spare, replaced by 76275. 76322 undergoing overhaul.
427	8027	**"413"**	-	4TC	Phase 1	-	-	-	76322	BR Blue and Grey	Swanage Railway	Operated by London Underground 1992–2003. Now owned by the Swanage Railway Trust. 70855 awaiting overhaul. 70824 undergoing overhaul. 76298 strategic spare, replaced by 76275. 76322 undergoing overhaul.
**415**	8015	-	-	4TC	Phase 1	-	-	70826	-	BR Blue	Sandford and Banwell railway station	Formed with unit 417 until 2011, moved to Sandford and Banwell railway station
**416**	8016	8010	-	4TC	Phase 1	-	70859	-	-	BR Blue	Stravithie railway station	-
**417**	8017	-	-	4TC	Phase 1	76301	70860	-	76302	BR Blue	Various	Unit split in 2011 with 76301 and 76302 moving to Bellingham, Northumberland. 70860 moved to Old North Road station. 76301 Acquired by Swanage 4TC Group and moved to the Swanage Railway on 31 July 2023. 76302 arrived on the Swanage Railway on 13 November 2023
**428**	8028	-	-	4TC	Phase 1	76297	71163	70823	76324	LT Maroon	West Ruislip LU depot	76297 was originally in unit 415, 71163 was originally in unit 302 and 70823 was originally in unit 412. Used by London Underground for special occasions.

== Model ==
In June 2016 it was announced a OO gauge model produced by Bachmann would be produced in collaboration with Kernow Model Rail, the models are available in a choice of six different livery variations.
