= Electric multiple unit =

Self-powered electric trains

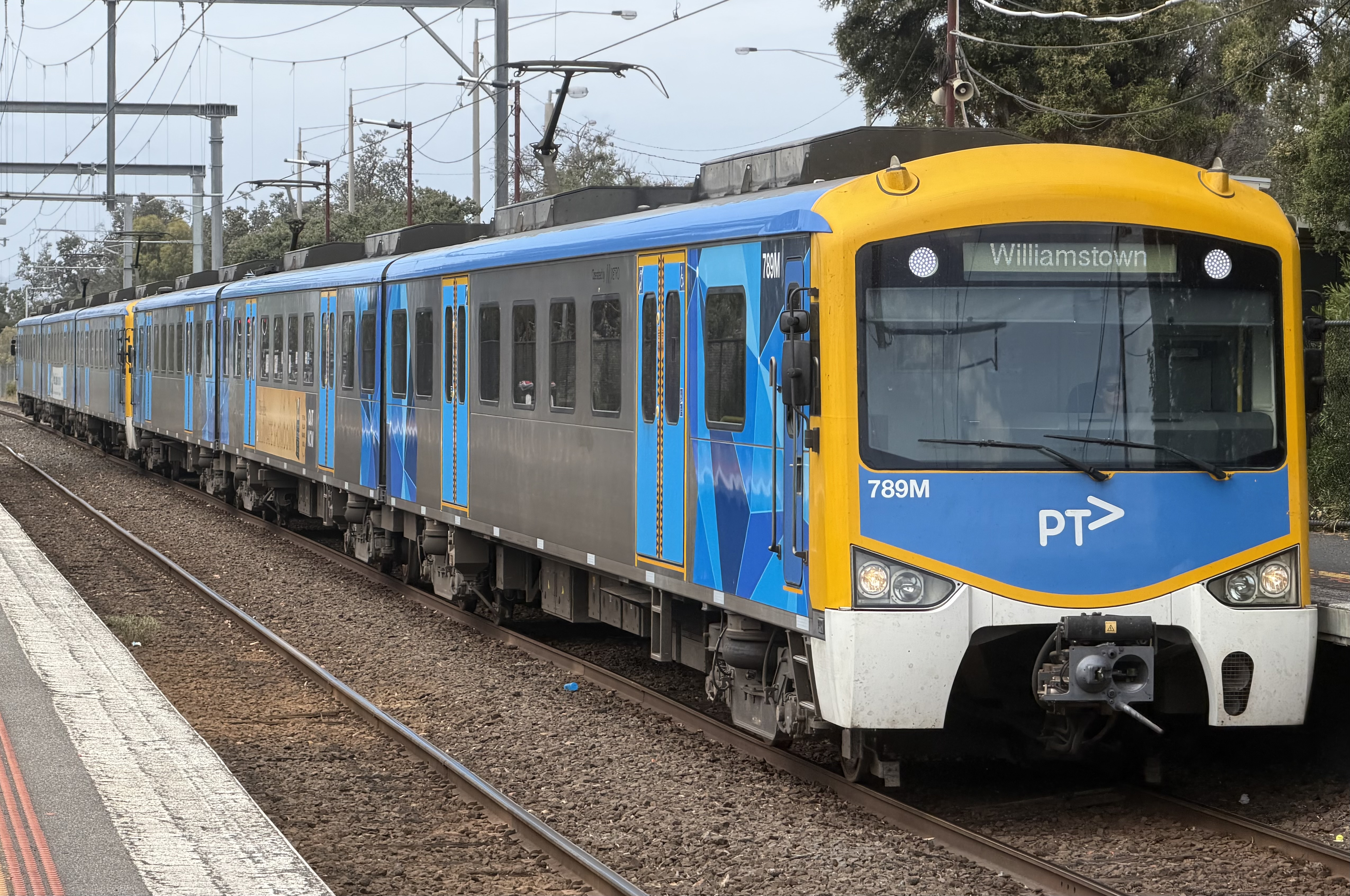
A six-car Siemens Nexas EMU arrives at Seaford on the up Frankston service in Melbourne, Australia

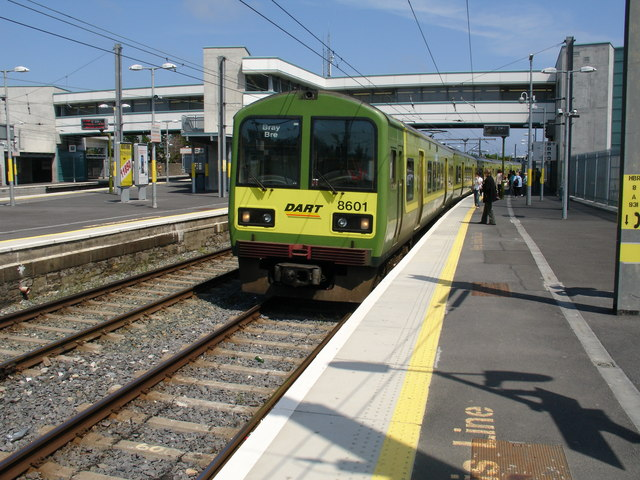
A DART 8500 Class suburban EMU at Howth Junction, in Ireland

An electric multiple unit (EMU) is a multiple-unit train consisting of self-propelled carriages using electricity as the motive power. An EMU requires no separate locomotive, as electric traction motors are incorporated within one or a number of the carriages. An EMU is usually formed of two or more semi-permanently coupled carriages. However, electrically powered single-unit railcars are also generally classed as EMUs. The vast majority of EMUs are passenger trains, but versions also exist for carrying mail.

EMUs are popular on inter-city and suburban rail networks around the world, due to their fast acceleration and pollution-free operation; they are used on most rapid-transit systems. Being quieter than diesel multiple units (DMUs) and locomotive-hauled trains, EMUs can operate later at night and more frequently without disturbing nearby residents. In addition, tunnel design for EMU trains is simpler as no provision is needed for exhausting fumes, although retrofitting existing limited-clearance tunnels to accommodate the extra equipment needed to transmit electric power to the train can be difficult.

== History ==
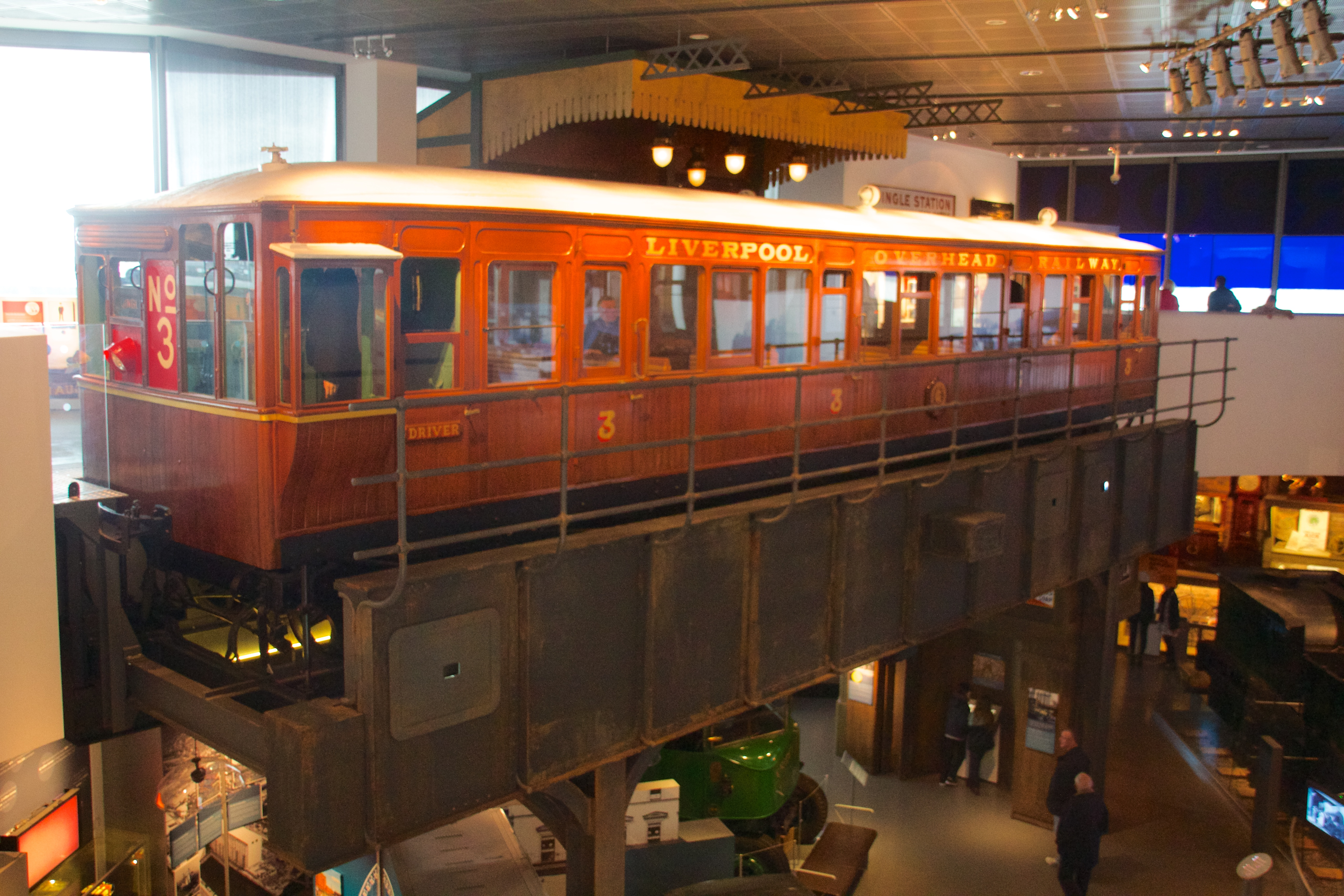
A Liverpool Overhead Railway carriage in the Museum of Liverpool, England; in 1893, these were the first EMUs introduced

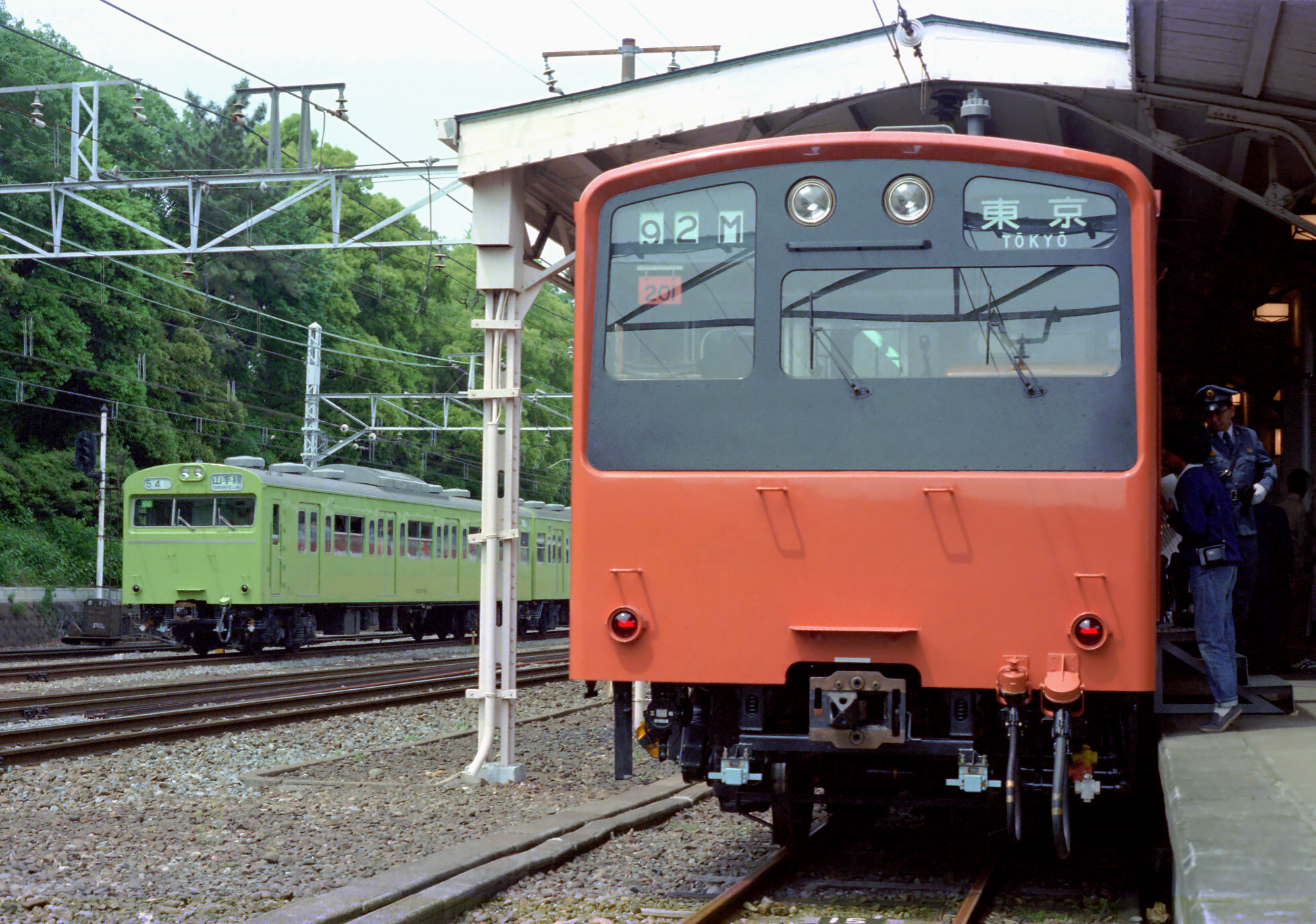
The prototype unit of JNR 201 series on public display at Harajuku Station in Tokyo, Japan (1979). Next to it, a Yamanote Line's 103 series unit can be seen passing

Multiple unit train control was first used in the 1890s, with the Liverpool Overhead Railway, in England, opening in 1893 with two-car electric multiple units, controllers in cabs at both ends directly controlling the traction current to motors on both cars.

The multiple unit traction control system was developed by Frank Sprague; it was first applied and tested on the South Side Elevated Railroad (now part of the Chicago 'L') in 1897. In 1895, derived from his company's invention and production of direct current elevator control systems, Sprague invented a multiple unit controller for electric train operation. This accelerated the construction of electric traction railways and trolley systems worldwide. Each car of the train has its own traction motors, by means of motor control relays in each car energised by electric wires from the front car; all of the traction motors in the train are controlled in unison.

As technology improved, with more compact and reliable electrical systems becoming available, EMUs became more common and supplanted locomotive-hauled stock on many networks. This process was accelerated on crowded networks with frequent trains, as the operational advantages in using EMUs outweighed the initial cost.

== Types ==
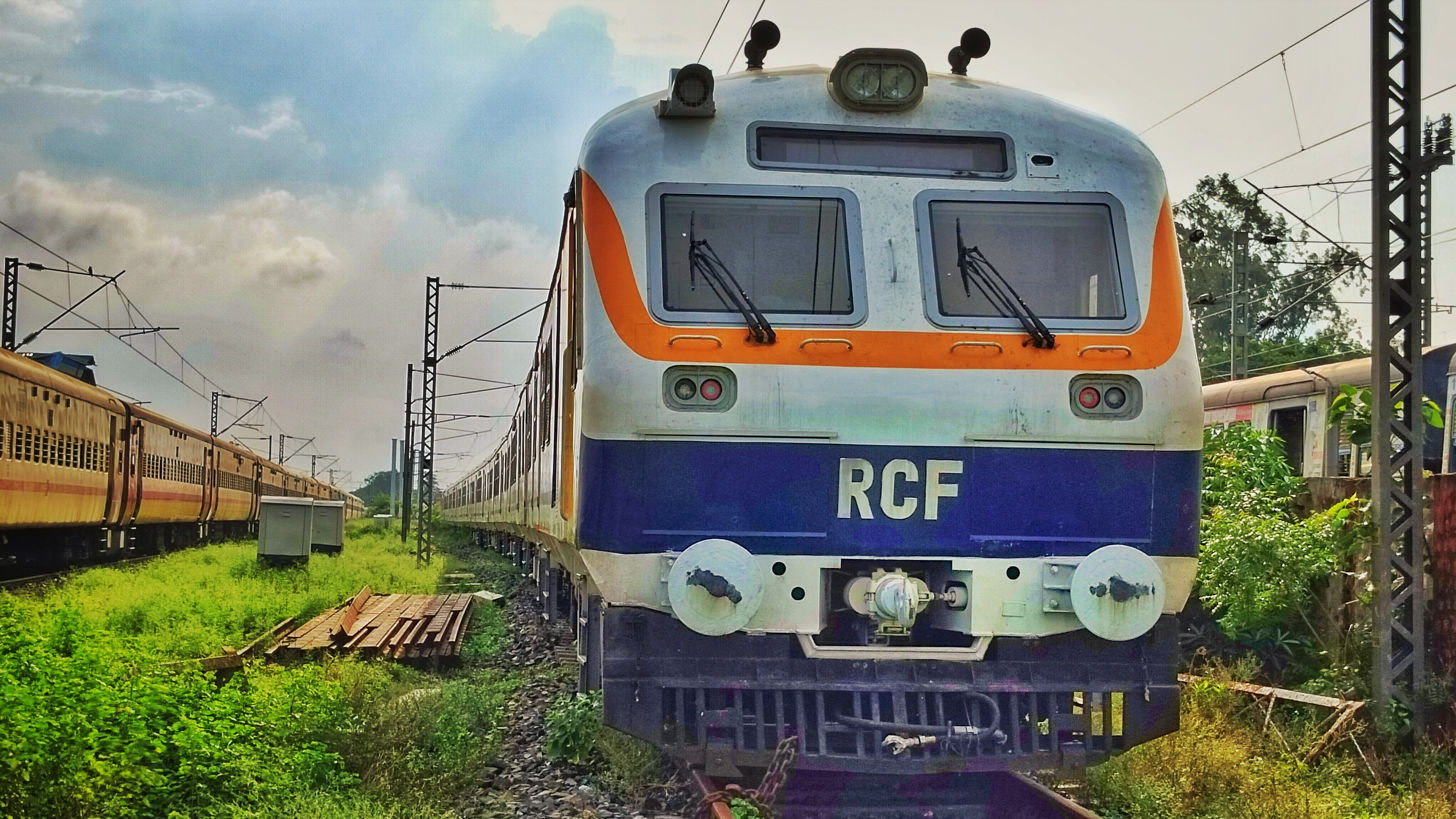
A third-generation MEMU unit produced by RCF and BHEL, India

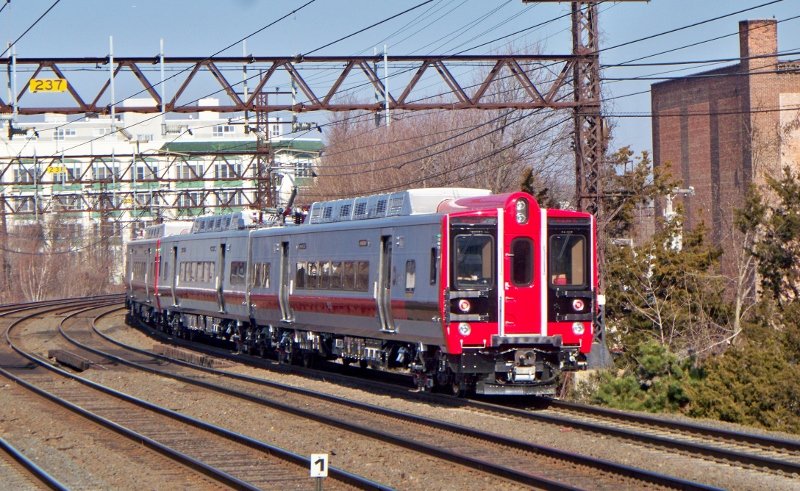
A Metro-North Railroad M8 twin pair at Port Chester, in New York, United States

The cars that form a complete EMU set can usually be separated by function into four types: power car, motor car, driving car and trailer car. Each car can have more than one function, such as motor-driving or power-driving.

- Power cars carry the necessary equipment to draw power from the electrified infrastructure, such as pickup shoes for third rail systems, pantographs for overhead systems, and transformers
- Motor cars carry the traction motors to move the train and are often combined with the power car to avoid high-voltage inter-car connections
- Driving cars are similar to a Control car, containing a driver's cab for controlling the train. An EMU will usually have two driving cars at its outer ends. These can have gangway connections to provide more operational flexibility, along with convenience for passengers
- Trailer cars are any cars (sometimes semi-permanently coupled) that carry little or no traction or power related equipment; they are similar to passenger cars in a locomotive-hauled train.

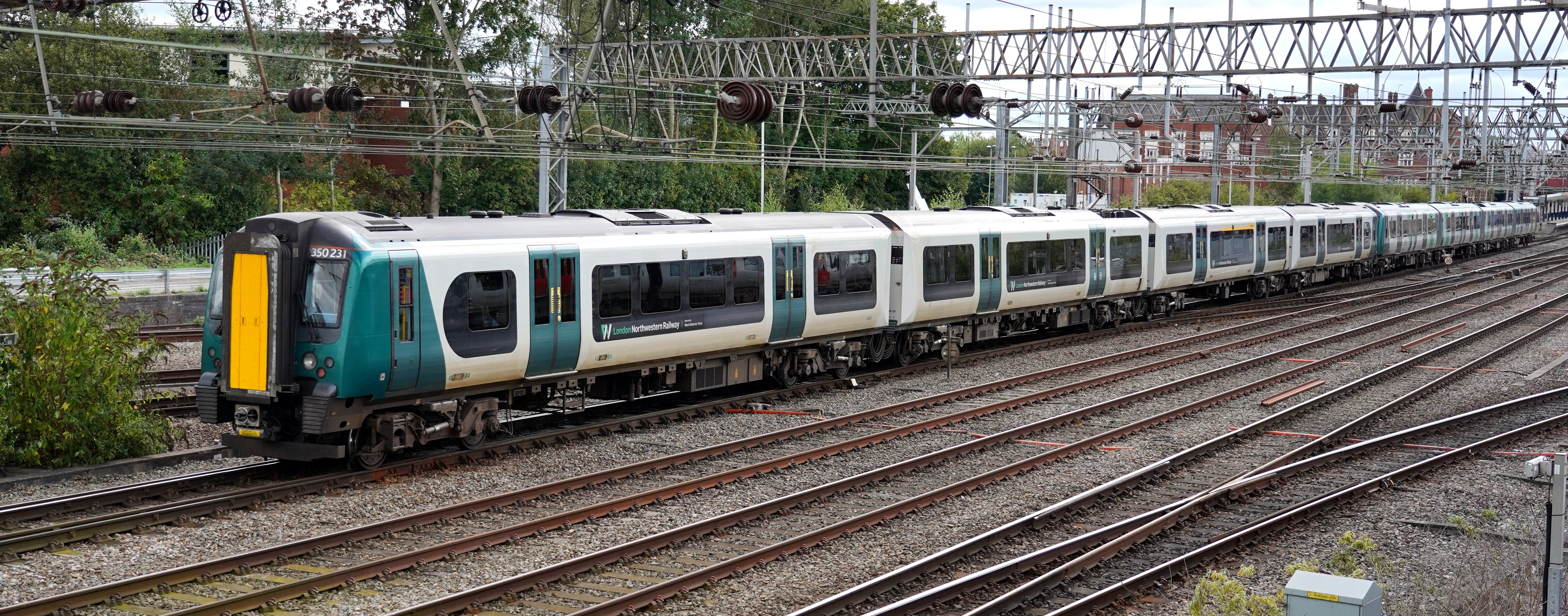
Coupled Class 350 EMUs on the lines outside Crewe Heritage Centre, England; note the gangway connection on the driving car

On third rail systems, the outer vehicles usually carry the pick up shoes, with the motor vehicles receiving the current via intra-unit connections; this helps to avoid 'gapping' events where the unit is not in contact with the third rail and needs rescuing. For modern EMUs that operate on AC overhead systems, the traction motors have often moved from the power car to separate motor cars. The power car retains the transformer and sends the required energy via connectors to the motor cars. This helps to distribute weight along the length of the EMU and reduces the maximum axle load and track access/maintenance costs. This is not a consideration with DC powered sets as no transformer is required and any other conversion equipment is lighter.

The majority of EMUs are set up as twin or married-pair units or longer sets. In addition to the traction motors, the ancillary equipment (Note: Such as air compressor and tanks, batteries and charging equipment, traction power and control equipment.) are shared between the cars in the set. Since no car can operate independently, such sets are only split at maintenance facilities. For longer length EMUs (eight+ cars), the unit will often have duplicate power, traction and braking systems in two halves of the set, providing redundancy for increased weight and cost.

Advantages of twin-pair or longer sets include weight and cost savings over single-unit cars, due to reducing the ancillary equipment required per set, while allowing multiple cars to be powered, unlike a motor-trailer combination. Each EMU has only two control cabs, located at the outer ends of the set. This saves space and expense over a cab at both ends of each car and provides more capacity. Disadvantages include a loss of operational flexibility, as trains must be multiples of a set length, and a failure on a single car could force removing the entire set from service.

In rare circumstances, EMUs can operate like locomotives by powering push-pull sets of trailer coaches. The Class 432 4-REP was an example of this, powering TC trailer units on passenger services on the South West Main Line in England.

== High-speed EMUs ==
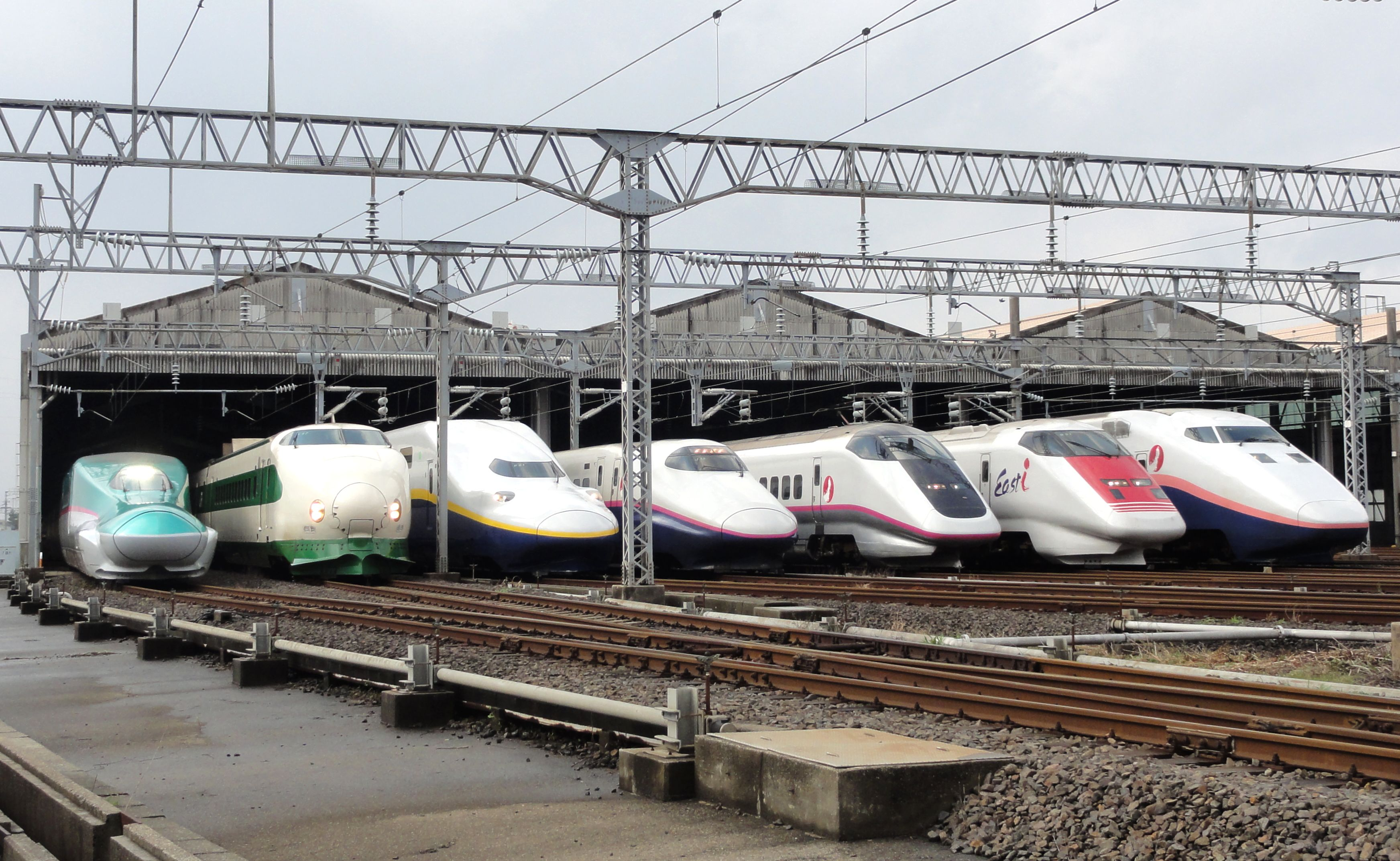
A lineup of JR East Shinkansen trains in Japan (2012)

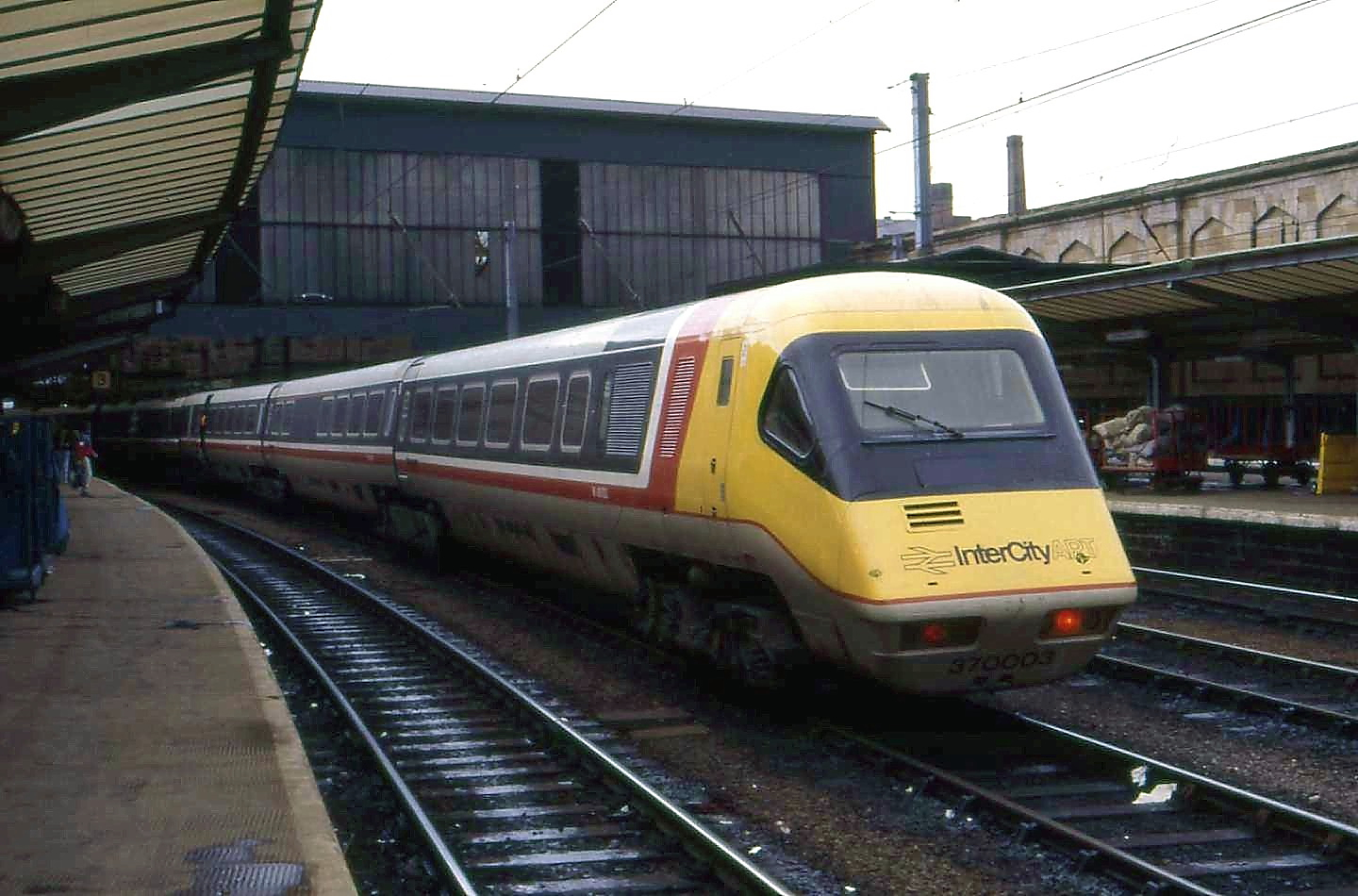
A Class 370 APT-P at Carlisle, England (1983)

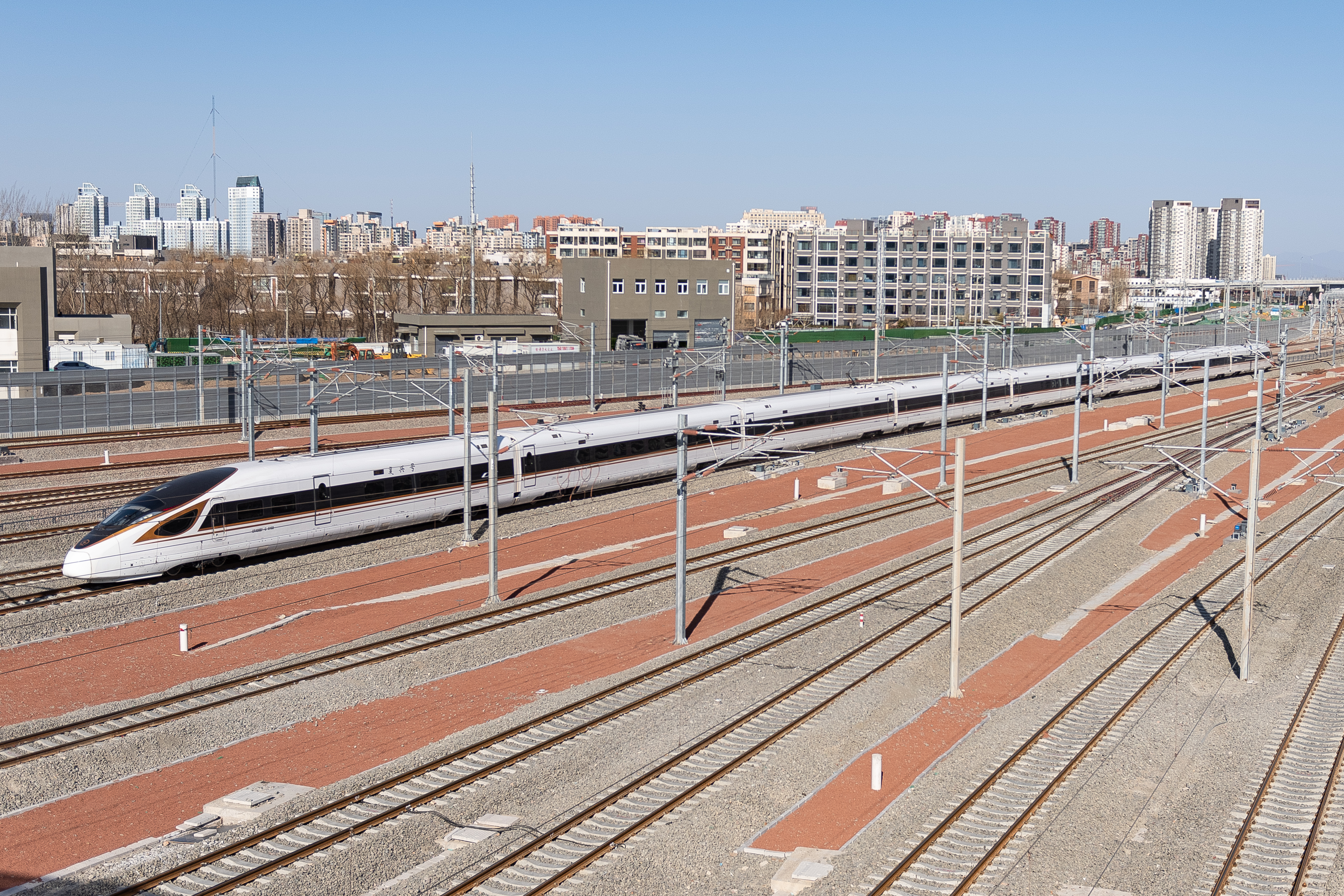
A China Railway High-speed CR400BF-G (2021)

High-speed electric train sets can use either distributed traction, with traction motors fitted to cars or bogies throughout the train, or concentrated traction, with power cars or electric locomotives placed at the ends of a fixed train set. The International Union of Railways (UIC) describes high-speed trains generally as self-propelled, fixed-composition and bidirectional; it distinguishes trains with locomotives at each end from trains where motorised bogies are distributed along the train. A UIC report on future high-speed rolling stock described a design trend toward distributed power, citing traction performance, capacity and axle-load limits, and noted that Japanese high-speed rolling stock had always used distributed power.

The first commercial high-speed railway, the Tokaido Shinkansen in Japan, opened in 1964 using 0 Series EMUs. Later high-speed EMU families include the Pendolino, ICE 3, Siemens Velaro, AGV, Hitachi A-train derivatives, (Note: Such as the Class 395 Javelin dual-voltage passenger trains in England.) China Railway High-speed CRH1, CRH2, CRH3, CRH5, CRH380A and Fuxing series, the Frecciarossa 1000 and KTX-Cheongryong.

For scale, UIC's 2022 overview estimated that there were more than 6,500 high-speed trains in operation worldwide, with China accounting for 54.7% of the fleet. A technical survey reported that China had 3,480 high-speed EMUs, converted to eight-car formation, by October 2019; UIC's 2024 atlas later reported about 4,900 high-speed trains operating daily worldwide.

Not all high-speed electric train sets use distributed traction. Some systems use concentrated-power formations, similar to push-pull trains, in which power cars or locomotives are placed at the ends of a fixed set. The TGV family, Eurostar e300, ICE 1, ICE 2, AVE Class 100, KTX-I and other TGV-derived designs use power cars or locomotives with intermediate passenger coaches rather than traction equipment distributed throughout the passenger cars. UIC's 2018 rolling-stock table marked these examples as concentrated-power trainsets, while listing later designs such as the ICE 3, Velaro derivatives and many Chinese CRH/CR series as motor-coach formations.

== Fuel cell development ==
EMUs powered by fuel cells are under development. If successful, this would avoid the need for an overhead line or third rail; an example is Alstom's hydrogen-powered Coradia iLint. The term hydrail has been coined for hydrogen-powered railway vehicles.

== Battery electric multiple units ==
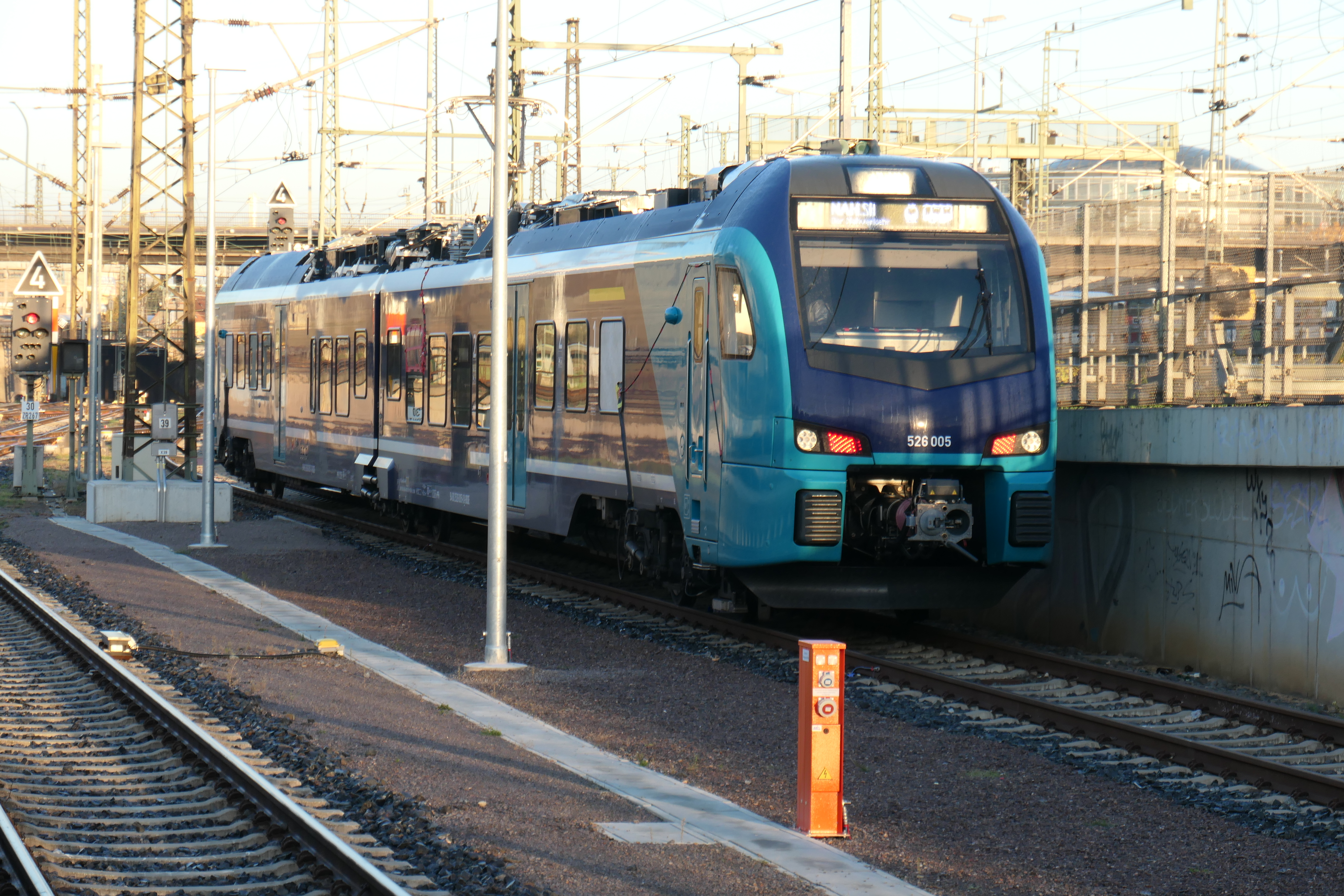
A Stadler Flirt Akku NAH.SH BEMU, operated in Germany

Many battery electric multiple units (BEMUs) are in operation around the world, with the take-up being strong. Many are bi-modal, taking energy from onboard battery banks and line pickups such as overhead wires or third rail. In some cases the batteries are charged via the electric pickup when operating on electric mode, while others use fast-charging systems installed at stations along the line or other methods such as regenerative braking.

== Comparison with locomotives ==
EMUs, when compared with electric locomotives, offer:

- Higher acceleration: since there are more motors sharing the same load, this allows for a higher total motor power output
- Braking: including eddy current, rheostatic and/or regenerative braking, on multiple axles at once, greatly reducing wear on brake parts (as the wear can be distributed among more brakes) and allowing for faster braking (lower/reduced braking distances)
- Reduced axle loads: since the need for a heavy locomotive is eliminated; this, in turn, allows for simpler and cheaper structures that use less material (Note: Including bridges and viaducts.) and lower structure maintenance costs
- Reduced ground vibrations
- Lower adhesion coefficients for driving (powered) axles, due to lower weight on these axles; weight is not concentrated on a locomotive
- A higher degree of redundancy: performance is only affected minimally following the failure of a single motor or brake
- Higher seating capacity: since there is no locomotive, all cars can contain seats.

Electric locomotives, when compared to EMUs, offer:

- Less electrical equipment per train; this results in lower train manufacturing and maintenance costs
- Allows for lower noise and vibration in passenger cars: since there are no motors or gearboxes on the bogies underneath
- Greater flexibility in use: they can haul both freight and passenger services.

== See also ==
- Electro-diesel multiple unit
- Diesel multiple unit
- Battery electric multiple unit
- British electric multiple units
- Mainline Electric Multiple Units in India.
