= British Rail Class 432 =

Class of "tractor" electric multiple unts

British Rail Class 432 (4-REP)
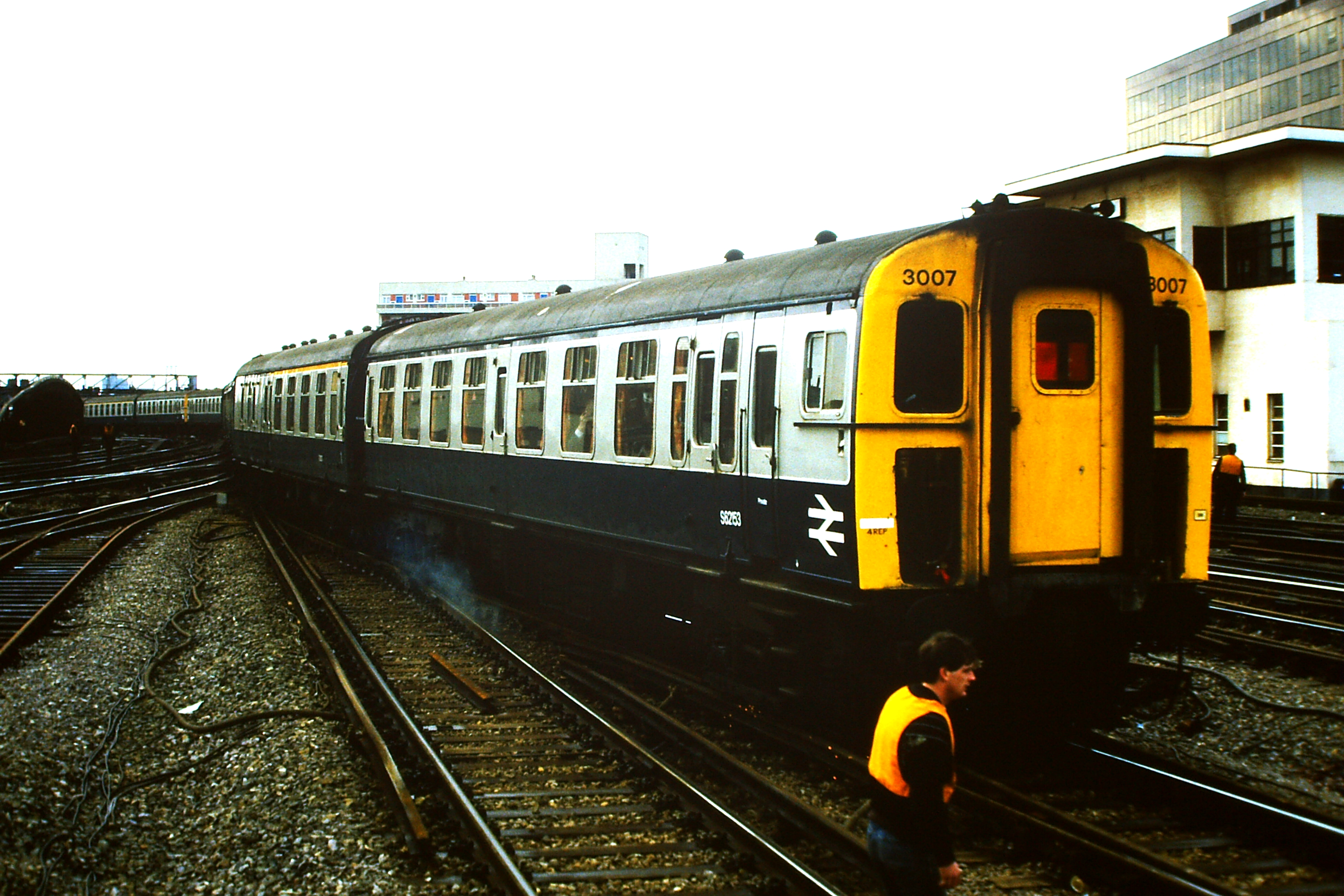
- 4-REP no. 3007 departing Waterloo in 1984
- In service: 1966–1992
- Manufacturer: British Rail
- Built at: York Works
- Family name: BR Mark 1 EMU
- Constructed: 1966–1967, 1974
- Number built: 15 sets
- Formation: 4 cars: DMSO-TRB-TBFK-DMSO
- Fleet numbers: 3001–3015, later 2001–2015
- Capacity: 24 First, 128 Standard, 23 buffet seats
- Operator: British Rail
- Depot: Bournemouth TMD
- Line served: London Waterloo – Bournemouth

Specifications
- Car length: DMSO: 19.75 m (64 ft 10 in); TRB/TBFK: 19.65 m (64 ft 6 in)
- Width: 2.82 m (9 ft 3 in)
- Maximum speed: 90 mph (145 km/h)
- Weight: DMSO: 52.5 t (51.7 long tons; 57.9 short tons); TRB: 34.6 t (34.1 long tons; 38.1 short tons); TBFK: 35.7 t (35.1 long tons; 39.4 short tons); Total: 175.3 t (172.5 long tons; 193.2 short tons)
- Traction motors: Eight EE546
- Power output: 8 x 300 kW (400 hp); Total: 2,400 kW (3,200 hp)
- Electric system: 750 V DC third rail
- Current collection: Contact shoe
- UIC classification: Bo′Bo′+2′2′+2′2′+Bo′Bo′
- Braking systems: Air (Auto and Electro-Pneumatic)
- Safety system: Automatic Warning System
- Track gauge: 1,435 mm (4 ft 8 1/2 in) standard gauge

The British Rail Class 432 (4-REP) electric multiple unit passenger trains were built by BR at York Works from 1966 to 1967 and in 1974. The units were built to power the TC trailer units on services on the South West Main Line. Fifteen four-car units were eventually built. The motor coaches were new build, but the trailers were converted from Mk1 hauled stock. They were initially classified as Class 441 and numbered 3001–3015. This was later changed to Class 430, under which they spent the majority of their working lives. Shortly before withdrawal in February 1992 they were reclassified Class 432 and the units were renumbered as 2001–2015. The fleet had a lifespan of 26 years.

== History ==
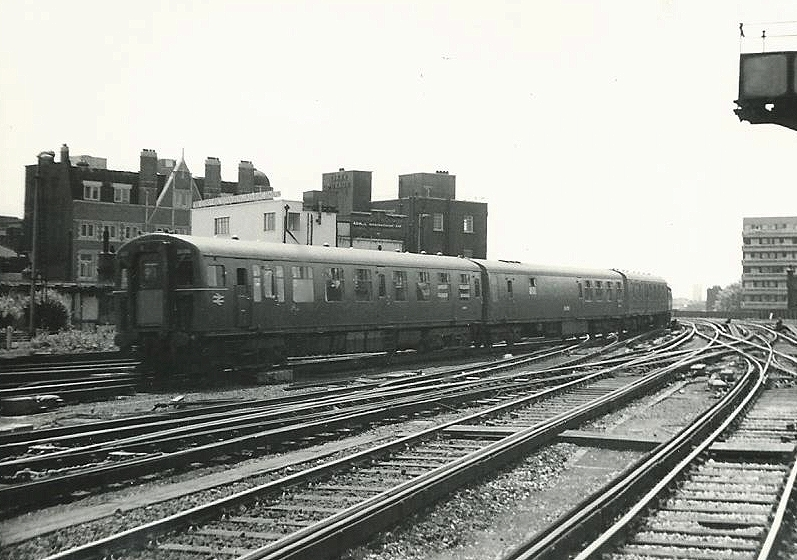
3006 approaching Waterloo in 1967, in all-blue livery.

The withdrawal of steam services and the full electrification of the line to Bournemouth came on 9 July 1967. At the time, there had been insufficient financial justification to electrify between Bournemouth and Weymouth. This resulted in a quandary: how to maintain through services. The solution devised was novel. Tests in the mid 1960s had proved that high speed main line push-pull operation was both feasible and safe. The result was to have a high powered 4-car EMU at the London end pushing trailer units to Bournemouth where the trailers would be detached and then pulled to Weymouth by a push-pull equipped diesel electric locomotive. The operation in the up direction would be the reverse.

The whole scheme also revealed a need for a small batch of locomotives to maintain connecting services between London (Waterloo) and the unelectrified area of Southampton Docks for the passenger Ocean Liner traffic. This need exceeded the capabilities of the already existing and versatile Class 73 Electro-diesels (1,600 hp (1,200 kW) on electric & 600 hp (450 kW) on diesel), which provided motive power across the region for numerous secondary duties requiring locomotive haulage. To provide for this need, and keep the whole scheme within the limited budget available, it was decided that 10 Class 71 2,550 hp (1,900 kW) straight electric locomotives operating on the South Eastern Division of the Region in the Kent area, that had become excess to operating needs, be converted to Class 74. The alterations turned these locomotives into another Electro-diesel type with 2,550 hp (1,900 kW) on electric and 650 hp (480 kW) on diesel. As it transpired the locomotives as altered were fairly unreliable, and the Ocean Liner traffic for which they were primarily intended was rapidly vanishing. They were therefore a short lived type that was introduced from late 1967 and withdrawn within 10 years.

The high powered (3,200 hp (2,400 kW)) EMU tractor units were classified 4-REP (Restaurant Electro-Pneumatic brake), the trailer units 3-TC and 4-TC (Trailer Control) and the push-pull equipped diesel locomotives were converted from 19 of the Southern's native BRCW type 3 1,550 hp (1,160 kW) fleet (eventually to become designated class 33/1).

Initially, eleven 4-REP units were built to propel the TC units to Bournemouth and pull them back to Waterloo. The 4-REPs were of the contemporary 1963 BR(S) EMU design and were formed of two driving motor second/standard saloons (DMSO) sandwiching a trailer brake first corridor (TBFK) and a trailer buffet (TRB). The DMSOs were new-builds but otherwise the TBFK was converted from a loco-hauled Mark 1 corridor composite and the TRB from Mark 1 loco-hauled Restaurant Buffets (RB) in (1966–67) or Restaurant Unclassifieds (RU) in (1974). Each of these restaurant/buffet cars were given names, the decorative panel behind the buffet counter carried the name of that particular car. The 4-REPs were as a result the most powerful 3rd rail type EMUs in the world, with a total of 3,200 hp (2,400 kW) available, in order to be able to provide the traction for up to eight trailer cars – just 100 horsepower (75 kW) less than the famous "Deltic" Class 55 diesel locomotives. Each REP unit had eight traction motors, and because of this to avoid an overload, a REP could only work with another powered EMU or Electro-Diesel Locomotive (EDL) if sufficient traction motors in the overall formation were first isolated. Each power bogie had a shoe beam with two pick-up shoes since there were two power circuits. In 1974, an additional four units were introduced to increase the frequency of the service and to provide cover for extended maintenance of the fleet. Even at this late stage, the by-then obsolescent Mk1 design was adhered to and a lack of Mk1 stock fit for conversion meant these last units were built from scratch – thus they were among the last Mk1 cars built. The 1974 build units were fitted with double-glazed windows (except for the sliding toplights) as fitted to contemporary CIG/BIG stock.

When first introduced, the REPs appeared in overall rail blue livery with small yellow warning panels and small aluminium BR arrows below their side cab windows. The yellow warning panels were subsequently enlarged to cover the whole cab front. They were repainted during the early 1970s into blue and grey, losing their aluminium arrows in the process, as these had been the cause of damage to carriage washing plants; the 1974 builds emerged in blue and grey livery from new. Surviving REPs saw an application of Network SouthEast flashes from 1986 onwards, while the Class 442 "Wessex Electrics" were being built.

The REPs were good performers in service, their maximum permitted speed of 90 mph (145 km/h) being easily exceeded even with a full load of two additional 4-TC trailer sets. They were, however, classified as locomotives by the operating department so when running by themselves (which was rare, but not unknown, in passenger service) they were limited to 60 mph (97 km/h) like a light locomotive. During the late 1970s, speed tests were carried out between Woking and Basingstoke with a view to upgrading the permitted maximum to 100 mph (161 km/h) but this was never undertaken mainly due to the increased braking performance required. On occasion, 9 trailer cars were hauled, when the General Manager's Saloon DB975025 was added to a 4-REP/8-TC formation.

During 1971 the London-end cabs of units 3001 to 3011 were equipped with an experimental form of cab signalling (SRAWS - Signal Repeating AWS) which was being trialled in the up-direction between Raynes Park and Surbiton as well as in the New Forest area. The cab layout showed the driver the aspect of the next signal and the one that the train had just passed.

The buffet restaurant cars of all REP units carried names, in a very decorative etched-glass panel behind the buffet counter.

== Accidents and incidents ==
- On 12 December 1988, a train comprising 4REP unit 2003 coupled to 4TC units 8015 and 8027 formed the 06:14 Poole - Waterloo service, which ran into the rear of the 07:18 Basingstoke - Waterloo train, comprising 4VEP units 3033, 3119 and 3005 at Clapham Junction. The two trains derailed and collided with a third train formed of 4VEP units 3004 and 3425 running in the opposite direction on an adjacent line. Thirty-five people were killed, nearly 500 were injured.

== Replacement ==
In the mid 1980s, the decision came to replace the Weymouth line stock – not only because finance had become available to electrify the line between Bournemouth and Weymouth using new low-cost technology but also because the unpowered REP and TC cars were converted from Mark 1 coaching stock originally built in the early 1950s thus, by the late 1980s, British Rail was looking to replace them. However, the long-established Southern practice of re-using equipment took place for the traction motors and control gear which, not being life-expired, were re-used. Various solutions to this stock shortage were found. In 1990, the South Hampshire Electrification Project (SHEP) was completed involving the Portsmouth to Eastleigh/Southampton lines. New stock was not allocated due to financial constraints but the service had to be kept running using existing resources. Originally it had been planned to retain three 4-REPs which had earlier been stripped of asbestos, however unit No. 2003 was partially written off following the Clapham Junction rail crash in 1988, so a change of plan was needed. Instead a new formation of four 6-REP units (numbers being 1903 to 1906) was considered and finally implemented on the route. Spare TC trailers were used to form the expanded units. The 432 driving cars were relocated into the middle of the formation and had their leading ends repainted and their driver compartment doors locked out of use. Shoe gear was fitted and all coaches in blue/grey were repainted into NSE colours. The 6-REPs also saw protracted use on the Weymouth line during the testing of Class 442s. In extreme cases, to keep services running, 4-REPs had a motor coach replaced by a Class 73 locomotive. The new stock was to be the Class 442, based on the Mark 3 coach bodyshell. This required REP units to be reformed and withdrawn to allow the equipment to be recovered before new 442s could become available. Reconfigured REPs and TCs soldiered on along the Weymouth line to cover for unavailable 442 units from mid 1988 until 1991. During the run formations changed regularly and renumbering of the units in the 19xx series was common, including the original 1901 and 1902 set numbers.

The final use of a REP was on the 10th of February 1992, with unit 1904 being the last. One coach from this particular unit was used in 4-VEP 3582 until April 2004.

== Further use ==
Two driving motors have survived from unit no. 2015 as departmental vehicles, albeit heavily modified, in use for ultrasonic testing of then Railtrack.

62483 became 999602 and ran sandwiched between Class 101 DMU vehicles converted to Class 901 until 2012, when it was considered as scrapped, however there have been sightings of its existence since, and has resumed operations as a locomotive-hauled train in 2021. 62482, since renumbered 999605, was formed in a locomotive-hauled test train usually in the care of two Class 31 locomotives.

62482 and 62483 are the last two 4-REP vehicles in existence and are currently in service, based at Derby RTC. The 4REP Appreciation Society was looking at saving the remaining carriages and turning them back to a 4-REP.
