= BSK Defense =

- Native name: BSK DEFENSE A.E.
- Romanized name: BSK DEFENSE S.A.
- Formerly: Velos O.E.
- Type: Private
- Industry: Aerospace and defense Engineering services (testing and analysis); Research and development
- Founded: May 30, 2008; 18 years ago
- Defunct: December 31, 2013
- Fate: Dissolved
- Headquarters: Crete, Chania, Greece
- Services: Digital systems R&D; R&D of control automation & remote control systems; UAV design & construction; marine vessel design & construction
- Website: bsk-defense.com

BSK Defense was the successor of Velos O.E., a company established in 1982, producing a series of aerial target and aerial observation products used by foreign companies and armed forces. The current company was founded in Chania, Crete, in 2008. It focused on design, development and production of defense systems, including UAVs (Phaeton, Ideon, Kyon, Erevos), USVs (Seirios 65 and 95), target drones (Nemesis, (H)Yperion, Panas), electronics, and UAV engines.

In 2010, it started development of a cruise missile type HSC-1 Makedon in cooperation with other Greek companies, including Axon Engineering (which undertook parts of the engine development). The missile was designed to be 4.5 metres (15 ft) long, weigh 1050 kg and reach a maximum speed of 1100 km/h. The project was eventually cancelled, due to Greece's drastically reduced defense budgets. The company was also involved in engine development, including the VRJ-230A jet engine, employed in its Nemesis B Target system.

BSK Defense went out of business in 2018.
