= BSK Saint Petersburg =

BSK
- City: Saint Petersburg, Russia
- Founded: 1936
- Folded: 2005

BSK Saint Petersburg (Russian: БСК Санкт-Петербург) was a bandy club in Saint Petersburg, Russia.

== Formation ==
The club was founded as «Krasnaya Zarya» (Russian: Красная Заря; "Red Dawn") in 1936 and switched to the name BSK in 2001 for sponsor reasons.

== Games ==
The club played one season in the Russian Bandy Super League, the top-tier of Russian bandy, in the 2003–04 season. The home games were played at Stadium Spartak in Saint Petersburg. The club colours were white and blue while the fan club was called "Red Bandy Fans".

== Financial crisis and closure ==
The club had to cease its activities in 2005 due to financial problems of the main sponsor.
