= Standard Corridor =

British mid-20th century railway carriage

British Rail Second Corridor
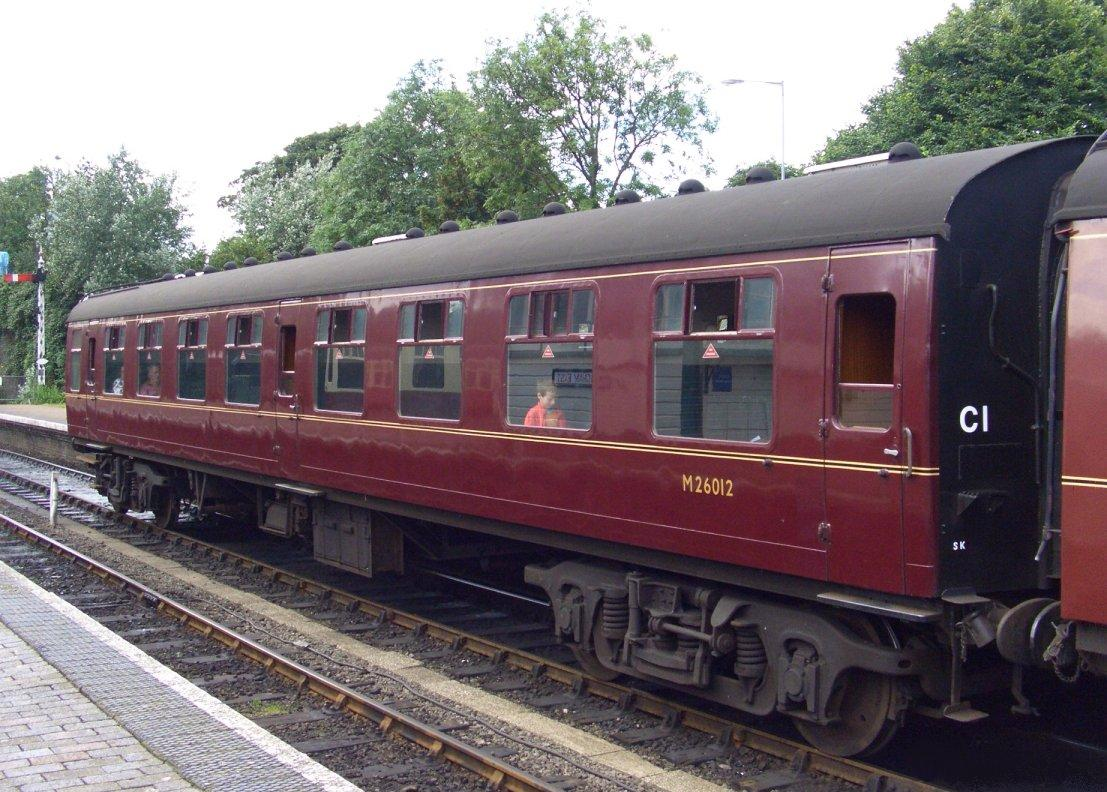
- A Mk1 Second Corridor (SK) coach at the North Norfolk Railway in 2007
- In service: 1951–present
- Manufacturer: BR Ashford/Easteigh, Derby (C&W), Doncaster, Swindon, Wolverton, York, BRCW, Cravens, GRCW, & Metro Cammell
- Family name: British Railways Mark 1 and Mark 2A, 2B and 2C
- Constructed: Mk1 1951–1963; XP64 1964; Mk2a 1968; Mk2b 1969; Mk2c 1969-70
- Number built: 2168
- Fleet numbers: Mk1 24000–25507, 25510–26217; XP64 25508-25509; Mk2a 19452-19473; Mk2b 19478-19513; Mk2c 19515-19560
- Capacity: Mk1 48 with armrests 64 without Mk2a/b/c 42
- Operators: British Rail

Specifications
- Car length: 64 ft 6 in (19.66 m)
- Width: 9 ft 3 in (2.82 m)
- Height: 12 ft 9 1/2 in (3.90 m)
- Doors: Manual slam doors, three on each side
- Maximum speed: BR1: 90 mph (145 km/h); B4/CW: 100 mph (161 km/h)
- Weight: 32.5 to 36.5 long tons (33.0 to 37.1 t; 36.4 to 40.9 short tons)
- HVAC: Steam or electric heat, or both
- Bogies: BR1, Commonwealth or B4
- Braking system(s): Vacuum, air, or both
- Coupling system: Drop-head knuckle coupler on draw-hook (dual)
- Track gauge: 4 ft 8 1/2 in (1,435 mm) standard gauge

The Second Corridor (previously Third Corridor) type of railway carriage was one of the standard mid-20th century designs, and was coded SK (previously TK) by the LNER and BR, and CF by the LMS. The layout of the coach was a number of compartments, all of which were second class (known as third class until 1956), linked by a side corridor.

The British Railways Mark 1 SK was the most numerous carriage design ever built in the United Kingdom. The original number series carried was 24000–26217. From 1983, those carriages in the 25xxx and 26xxx series were renumbered 18xxx and 19xxx.

There were two variants, those built for the Midland, Scottish, and Eastern / North Eastern regions had six seats per compartment, with fold-up arm-rests which folded into the seat-back, while those built for the Southern and Western regions, with their heavy commuter loadings into London, had eight seats in each compartment, and no arm-rests. Seating was of the interior sprung bench type. Over time, some SKs and BSKs were re-allocated from other regions to the Western, who tended to try to stitch the arm-rests in the up position.

In 1985, a number of Mark 2 First Corridor carriages were declassified to become SKs. They were renumbered from 13xxx to 19xxx, putting them after the end of the Mark 1 range (19452–19560).

No carriages of this type are still in daily use on the main line network, since open saloon carriages are now preferred by operating companies. However, some electric multiple units based on Mark 1 coaches have standard class compartments, such as Class 438. Many SKs still operate on preserved UK railway lines.

Designations for second corridor carriages are as follows:

LNER Code	Description	LMS Code
BSK	Brake Second Corridor	CH
DMBSK	Driving Motor Brake Second Corridor	
DMSK	Driving Motor Second Corridor	
MBSK	Motor Brake Second Corridor	
SK	Second Corridor	CF
TBSK	Trailer Brake Second Corridor	
TSK	Trailer Second Corridor	

== Livery ==
In 1951 the initial livery for Mk1 coaches on British Railways was crimson lake and cream with black and gold lining, and all new Mk1 SK coaches were delivered in this livery up until 1956. In 1956 the standard livery changed to maroon with black and gold lining, except for the Southern region stock which adopted an unlined dark malachite green. Western Region adopted chocolate and cream on sufficient stock to operate its named trains such as the Cornish Riviera Express and the Torbay Express. In 1965 Manastral Blue & Grey livery was introduced as trailed on XP64 stock the year before and was the network standard for over 20 years. In the 1980s the NSE livery of white with blue at window level and red stripe under was introduced for stock in the south east of England.

== Orders ==
Lot No.	Diagram	Mark	Built	Builder	Qty	Fleet numbers	Notes
30002	146	1	1951	Derby	180	24000–24179	BR1 bogies
30015	146	1	1951-2	Doncaster	40	24180–24219	BR1 bogies
30026	146	1	1951-2	York	82	24220–24301	BR1 bogies
30020	146	1	1952	Ashford	24	24302–24331	BR1 bogies
30007	146	1	1953	BRCW	36	24332–24396	BR1 bogies
30030	146	1	1953	Derby	40	24397–24436	BR1 bogies
30072	146	1	1953	Wolverton	10	24437–24446	BR1 bogies
30088	146	1	1954	Swindon	22	24447–24468	BR1 bogies
30070	146	1	1954	York	36	24469–24538	BR1 bogies
30068	147	1	1952	York	30	24539–24548	BR1 bogies
30070	146	1	1952	York	8	24549-24556	BR1 bogies
30070	146	1	1954	York	12	24557–24568	BR1 bogies
30070	146	1	1954-55	York	7	24569-24575	BR1 bogies
30057	146	1	1953	BRCW	100	24576–24675	BR1 bogies
30058	146	1	1953	Cravens	25	24676–24700	BR1 bogies
30059	147	1	1953	Cravens	20	24701–24720	BR1 bogies
30073	146	1	1953	Wolverton	25	24721–24745	BR1 bogies
30077	147	1	1954	Swindon	8	24746–24753	BR1 bogies
30078	146	1	1954	Swindon	42	24754–24795	BR1 bogies
30137	146	1	1954	BRCW	23	24796–24818	BR1 bogies
30153	146	1	1955-56	Derby	126	24819–24944	BR1 bogies
30154	146	1	1956	Derby	30	24945–24974	BR1 bogies
30208	146	1	1956	Derby	70	24975–25044	BR1 bogies
30155	147	1	1955-56	Wolverton	120	25045–25164	BR1 bogies
30230	147	1	1957	Metro Cammell	83	25165–25247	BR1 bogies
30231	146	1	1957-58	Metro Cammell	32	25248–25279	BR1 bogies
30494	150	1	1958	Metro Cammell	3	25280–25282	BR1 bogies
30349	146	1	1957	Wolverton	120	25283–25402	BR1 bogies
30350	146	1	1957	Wolverton	22	25403–25454	BR1 bogies
30356	148	1	1957	Metro Cammell	1	25455	BR1 bogies
30358	149	1	1957	GRCW	1	25456	BR1 bogies
30371	151	1	1957	Doncaster	1	25457	BR1 bogies
30374	146	1	1957	York	50	25458-25507	BR1 bogies
30737	152	XP64	1964	Derby	2	25508-25509	B4 bogies
30426	146	1	1957-58	Wolverton	146	25558-25703	BR1 bogies
30685	146	1	1961-62	Derby	202	25704-25905	CW bogies
30685	146	1	1962	Derby	67	25906-25972	BR1 bogies
30719	146	1	1962	Derby	87	25973-26059	CW bogies
30720	147	1	1962-63	Derby	78	26060-26137	CW bogies
30726	146	1	1962-63	York	80	26138-26217	CW bogies

== Conversions ==
- In 1973-74 4 Second Corridor were converted to Class 309 TSK later become TSOL
- In 1976, 9 Second Corridor were converted to Stowage Vans 80431-80439 POT
- In 1977, 15 Second Corridor were converted to Sorting Vans 80381-80395 POS.

SK	TSK	Diagram	
26024	71110	469	Class 309
26189	71108	469	Class 309
26196	71109	469	Class 309
26203	71107	469	Class 309

SK	Type		Year	Diagram
25033	POS	80383	1977	726A/NS531
25045	POS	80387	1977	726A/NT531
25047	POS	80390	1977	726A/NT531
25056	POS	80395	1977	726A/NT531
25068	POT	80437	1976	727A/NT521
25071	POT	80432	1976	727A/NS521
25077	POT	80436	1976	727A/NS521
25078	POS	80384	1977	726A/NS531
25082	POS	80392	1977	726A/NS531
25083	POS	80385	1977	726A/NS531
25088	POS	80388	1977	726A/NS531
25089	POS	80391	1977	726A/NS531
25099	POS	80386	1977	726A/NS531
25103	POS	80389	1977	726A/NS531
25104	POT	80431	1976	727A/NS521
25109	POS	80382	1977	726A/NS531
25112	POS	80381	1977	726A/NS531
25117	POT	80435	1976	727A/NT521
25119	POS	80393	1977	726A/NT531
25127	POT	80439	1976	726A/NT521
25434	POT	80434	1976	726A/NT521
25139	POT	80438	1976	727A/NT521
25150	POT	80433	1976	727A/NT521
25156	POS	80394	1977	726A/NT531

=== Departmental use ===
Mk1
SK		Departmental	Notes
24011		DB975415	Match wagon for ballast cleaner
24026		ADB977057	Doncester works test train
24035		ADB975439	Crewe works test train
24062		LDB975062	CM&EE Electrification staff coach
24067		LDB975064	CM&EE Electrification staff coach
24070		ADB975161	BTU tool van
24085		TDB977187	Train crew training coach
24119		ZDB975074	Exhibition coach
24134		LDB975065	CM&EE Electrification staff coach
24140		LDB975066	CM&EE Electrification staff coach
24147		ZDB975073	Exhibition coach
24154		ADB975263	Overhead Line Maintenance Stores coach
24157		ADB975162	BUT Tool & Generator coach
24168		LDB975067	CM&EE Electrification staff coach
24189		LDB975068	CM&EE Electrification staff coach
24274		ADB975801	CCE staff & dormitory coach for ballast cleaner
24308		DB975392	Match wagon for ballast cleaner DR76216
24320		LDB975069	CM&EE Electrification staff coach
24345		ADB975806	CCE staff coach
24410		LDB975070	CM&EE Electrification staff coach
24420		KDB975114	S&T cable flat
24428		ADB977058	Doncester works test train
24429		ADB975904	Overhead Line Maintenance cable flat
24430		TDB977188	Train crew training coach
24457		ADB975799	CCE staff & dormitory coach for ballast cleaner
24485		DB975412	Match wagon for ballast cleaner
24516		TDB977189	Train crew training coach
24531		ADB975726	Overhead Line Maintenance generator & stores coach
24579		ADB977090	CCE staff coach
24589		ADB975546	Overhead Line Maintenance cable flat
24647		TDB975135	Lecture coach
24677		TDB977247	MOD special instruction coach
24679		TDB977248	MOD special instruction coach
24685		TDB977422	Special instruction coach
24745		KDB975106	S&T cable flat
24752		ADB975440	Crewe works test train
24766		ADB975732	Overhead Line Maintenance stores & roof access coach
24796		ADB975802	CCE staff & dormitory coach for ballast cleaner
24815		ADB975803	CCE staff & dormitory coach for ballast cleaner
24841		TDB977497	Special instruction coach
24849		ADB975925	Overhead Line Maintenance cable flat
24857		TDB977498	Special instruction coach
24858		ADB977059	Doncester works test train
24870		ADB975441	Crewe works test train
24890		TDB977430	Special instruction coach
24899		CDB977103	EMU barrier coach
24936		ADB975442	Crewe works test train
24972		ADB975805	CCE staff & dormitory coach for single line gantries
24976		DB975828	Underframes used for CCE staff & dormitory portakabin
24982		DB975379	CCE staff & dormitory coach
24990		ADB975926	Overhead Line Maintenance cable flat
24994		ADB975915	Overhead Line Maintenance cable flat
25003		ADB975913	Overhead Line Maintenance cable flat
25017		ADB975742	Overhead Line Maintenance office & staff coach
25025		ADB975920	Overhead Line Maintenance cable flat
25026		ADB975922	Overhead Line Maintenance cable flat
25038		ADB977320	Crewe works diesel loco test train coach
25069		ADB975924	Overhead Line Maintenance cable flat
25079		ADB975080	BTU tool van
25094		ADB975908	Overhead Line Maintenance cable flat
25105		ADB975905	Overhead Line Maintenance cable flat
25106	18106	ADB977322	Crewe works diesel loco test train coach
25122		ADB975443	Crewe works test train
25132		ADB975797	CCE staff & dormitory coach for ballast cleaner
25161		ADB975906	Overhead Line Maintenance cable flat
25171		TDB977195	MOD special instruction coach
25190		ADB975736	Overhead Line Maintenance stores & roof access coach
25196		ADB975927	Overhead Line Maintenance cable flat
25205		ADB975930	Overhead Line Maintenance cable flat
25222		ADB975622	EMU Barrier coach
25226		ADB975722	Overhead Line Maintenance generator & stores coach
25236		CDB977102	EMU barrier coach
25238		ADB975923	Overhead Line Maintenance cable flat
25243		ADB975946	Overhead Line Maintenance cable flat
25262		ADB975712	Overhead Line Maintenance stores coach
25281		DB975816	Underframes used for CCE staff & dormitory portakabin
25286	18286	TDB977496	Special instruction coach
25302		ADB975771	Overhead Line Maintenance office & staff coach
25318	18318	ADB977323	Crewe works diesel loco test train coach
25326		ADB977319	Crewe works diesel loco test train coach
25329		DB975829	Underframes used for CCE staff & dormitory portakabin
25338		TDB977173	Train crew training coach
25339		ADB977151	Crewe work test tain
25340		ADB975903	Overhead Line Maintenance cable flat
25343		ADB975798	CCE staff & dormitory coach for ballast cleaner
25353		ADB975763	Overhead Line Maintenance generator & stores coach
25356	18356	ADB977321	Crewe works diesel loco test train coach
25358		ADB975743	Overhead Line Maintenance office & staff coach
25388		ADB975723	Overhead Line Maintenance generator & stores coach
25396		TDB977174	Train crew training coach
25407	18407	TDB977407	MOD special instruction coach
25412	18412	TDB977584	Special instruction coach
25420		ADB975713	Overhead Line Maintenance stores coach
25422	18422	TDB977499	Special instruction coach
25429		DB975817	Underframes used for CCE staff & dormitory portakabin
25430		ADB975758	Overhead Line Maintenance stores coach
25434		ADB975711	Overhead Line Maintenance stores coach
25437		ADB975762	Overhead Line Maintenance generator & stores coach
25440		ADB975744	Overhead Line Maintenance office & staff coach
25461		ADB975767	Overhead Line Maintenance stores & roof access coach
25466		ADB975714	Overhead Line Maintenance stores coach
25477		ADB975766	Overhead Line Maintenance stores & roof access coach
25479		ADB975738	Overhead Line Maintenance stores & roof access coach
25480		DB975825	Underframes used for CCE staff & dormitory portakabin
25493		DB975822	Underframes used for CCE staff & dormitory portakabin
25494		TDB977237	MOD special instruction coach
25495		ADB975759	Overhead Line Maintenance stores coach
25497		DB975830	Underframes used for CCE staff & dormitory portakabin
25498		ADB975947	Overhead Line Maintenance cable flat
25507		ADB975800	CCE staff & dormitory coach for ballast cleaner
25567		TDB977129	MOD Special instruction coaches
25570	18570	TDB977408	MOD spechal instruction coach
25600		ADB975721	Overhead Line Maintenance generator & stores coach
25602	18602	DB977724	CE staff & tool coach
25623		CDB977100	EMU barrier coach
25664		ADB975741	Overhead Line Maintenance office & staff coach
25666		ADB975444	Crewe works test train
25667		DB975824	Underframes used for CCE staff & dormitory portakabin
25669		DB975821	Underframes used for CCE staff & dormitory portakabin
25695		ADB975734	Overhead Line Maintenance stores & roof access coach
25696		ADB975804	CCE staff & dormitory coach for ballast cleaner
25699		DB975823	Underframes used for CCE staff & dormitory portakabin
25729	18729	ADB977982	Brake Force Runner
25735	18735	TDB977653	Special instruction coach
25755	18755	TDB977419	Special instruction coach
25764		ADB975731	Overhead Line Maintenance stores & roof access coach
25807	18807	TDB977420	Special instruction coach
25811	18811	TDB977514	Driver training coach
25831	18831	TDB977458	Driver training coach
25840	18840	TDB977459	Driver training coach
25846	18846	TDB977515	Driver training coach
25852	18852	TDB977429	Special instruction coach
25859	18859	TDB977428	Special instruction coach
25860	18860	TDB977516	Driver training coach
25878	18878	TDB977517	Driver training coach
25884	18884	TDB977460	Driver training coach
25885	18885	TDB977461	Driver training coach
25953		ADB975866	EMU barrier coach
25973	18973	TDB977462	Driver training coach
25985	18985	TDB977463	Driver training coach
26002	19002	TDB977464	Driver training coach
26010	19010	TDB977465	Driver training coach
26020	19020	TDB977512	Driver training coach
Mk2a
FK	SK	Departmental	Notes
13458	19458	RDB977914	Test Train coach
13462	19465	6352	Mk4 Barrier coach
13466	19466	TDB977662	MOD Special instruction coach
Mk2b
FK	SK	Departmental	Notes
13476	19476	RDB977525	Brake force runner
13478	19478	6353	Mk4 Barrier coach
13481	19481	RDB977530	Brake force runner
13484	19484	RDB977528	Brake force runner
13485	19485	TDB977663	MOD Special instruction coach
13487	19487	RDB977529	Brake force runner
13491	19491	TDB977661	MOD Special instruction coach
13501	19501	TDB977656	MOD Special instruction coach
13505	19505	TDB977654	MOD Special instruction coach
13511	19511	TDB977660	MOD Special instruction coach
Mk2c
FK	SK	Departmental	Notes
13518	19518	TDB977659	MOD Special instruction coach
13531	19531	TDB977658	MOD Special instruction coach
13557	19557	TDB977655	MOD Special instruction coach

== Corridor Brake Standard/Second ==
A second corridor coach with a guard's brake compartment is designated BSK. The Mark 1 BSKs had 4 compartments, built as two variants with or without arm-rests depending on region, as with the SKs.

== See also ==
- Corridor coach
