= Tourist Standard Open =

British railways carriage

British Rail Tourist Second Open
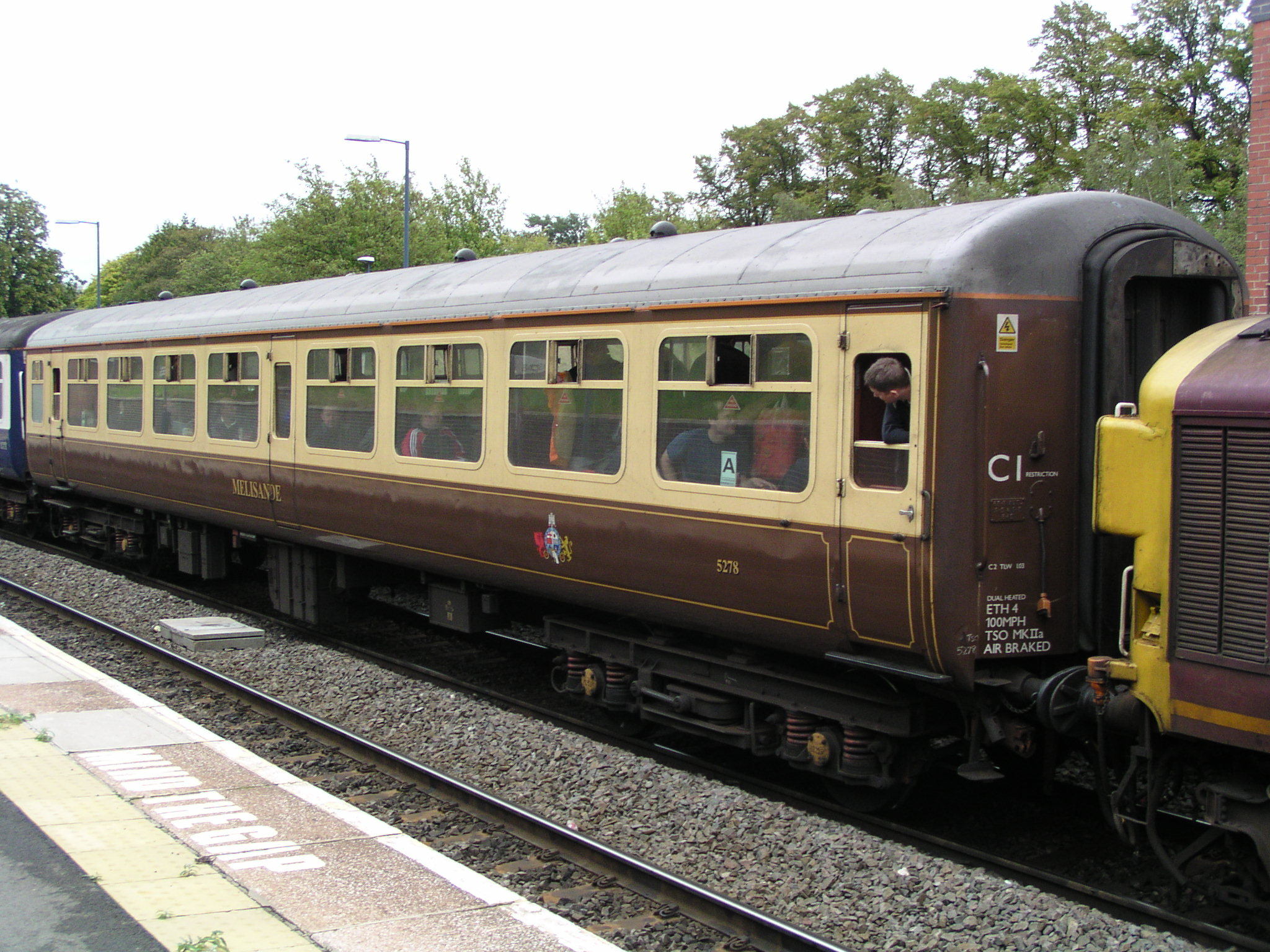
- Mark 2A TSO 5278 "Melisande" at Cheltenham Spa in September 2004
- In service: 1952-
- Manufacturers: Derby; Doncaster; York; Ashford; Eastleigh; Wolverton; Birmingham Railway Carriage & Wagon Company; Cravens; Metro-Cammell
- Operator: British Rail

Specifications
- Car length: 64 ft 6 in (19.66 m)
- Width: 9 ft 3 in (2.82 m)
- Height: 12 ft 9 1/2 in (3.90 m)
- Weight: 39.9 long tons (40.5 t; 44.7 short tons)
- Track gauge: 1,435 mm (4 ft 8 1/2 in) standard gauge

Tourist Second Open or Tourist Standard Open, abbreviated to TSO, is a type of British Railways coach. The designation "Tourist" was originally as opposed to a normal SO (Second Open) coach. Both types have the same number of seating bays per coach, but the TSO has four seats across, arranged 2+2 either side of a central aisle, while an SO has 3 seats across, arranged 2+1 with an offset aisle. Both offer the same legroom, but there is slightly less width per passenger in a TSO.

Even though the designations would appear to suggest that the SO was the standard type and the TSO a variant, in reality the TSO has been the default design of open coach on British Railways since the dawn of the Mark 1 era, built in large numbers, with comparatively few SO vehicles constructed, mainly for use as Third/Second/Standard class restaurant cars.

In 1987, British Rail changed the title to Tourist Standard Open, when "Second Class" became "Standard Class" across the network. The TSO designation remains in use for Mark 3A and Mark 4 Open Standard carriages., even though no SO coaches have been constructed since the Mark 2a build in the mid-1960s.

The designation TSO is also used for Trailer Standard Open in the system of British Rail coach type codes. Whereas Tourist Standard Open applies only to loco-hauled stock, Trailer Standard Open is used in multiple-unit stock; in this case most have 2+2 seating but some have 3+2.

== Mark 1 ==
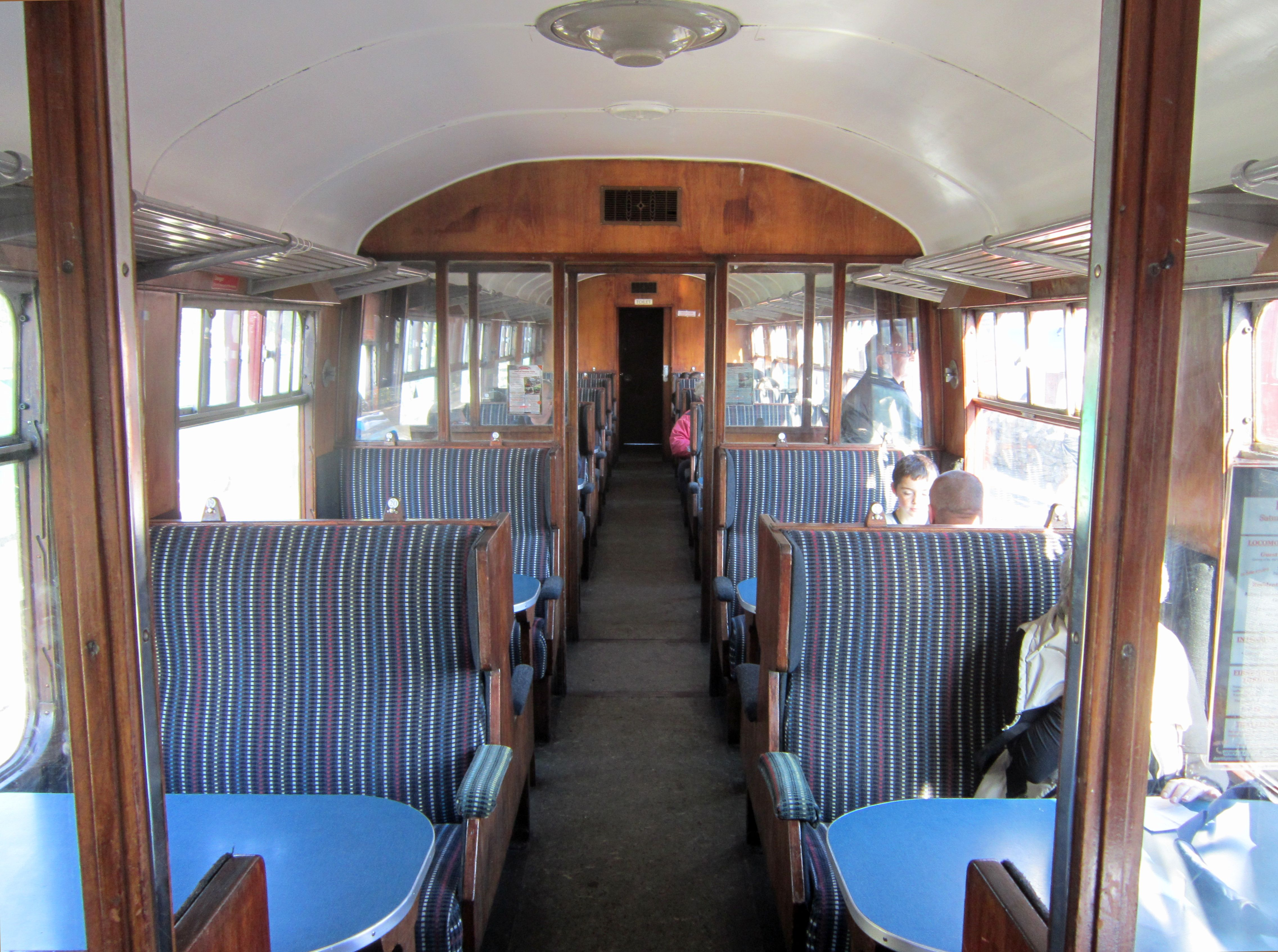
Interior of a Mark 1 TSO, Avon Valley Railway

The Mark 1 TSO contains sixteen seating bays of four seats each, three transverse entrance vestibules, and two toilets arranged either side of a central corridor leading to the gangway at one end. The sixteen bays are distributed along the coach in two saloons of eight bays either side of the almost-central door vestibule (this is slightly offset towards one end by the presence of the toilets at the other end), and the saloon nearest to the toilets is further divided into two saloons of four bays each by a transverse partition. The bay spacing is 6 ft 6 in (1.98 m), this being the standard for Mark 1 Third / Second / Standard class, and identical to the compartment spacing in Mark 1 side corridor stock.

The first 20 Mark 1 TSOs (3700–19) did not have the centre door vestibule, so the 8 seating bays were spread equally along the saloon length.

No Mark 1 TSOs are still in use with franchised TOCs, however a number are still in active service with railtour and charter operators. They are also found on almost all mainland UK standard gauge heritage/preserved/tourist lines.

== Mark 2 ==
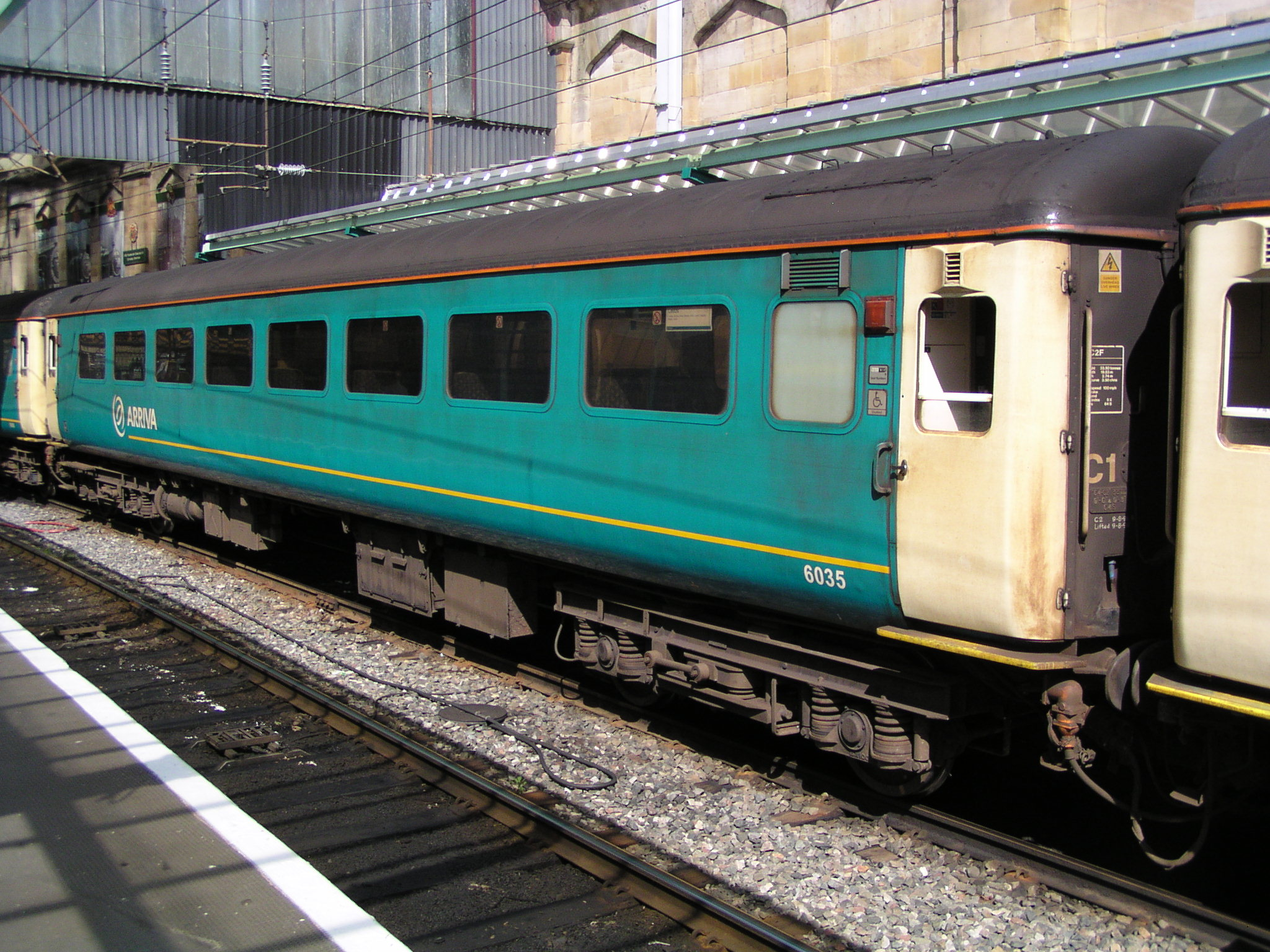
Arriva Trains Northern Mark 2F TSO 6035 at Carlisle on 27 August 2004

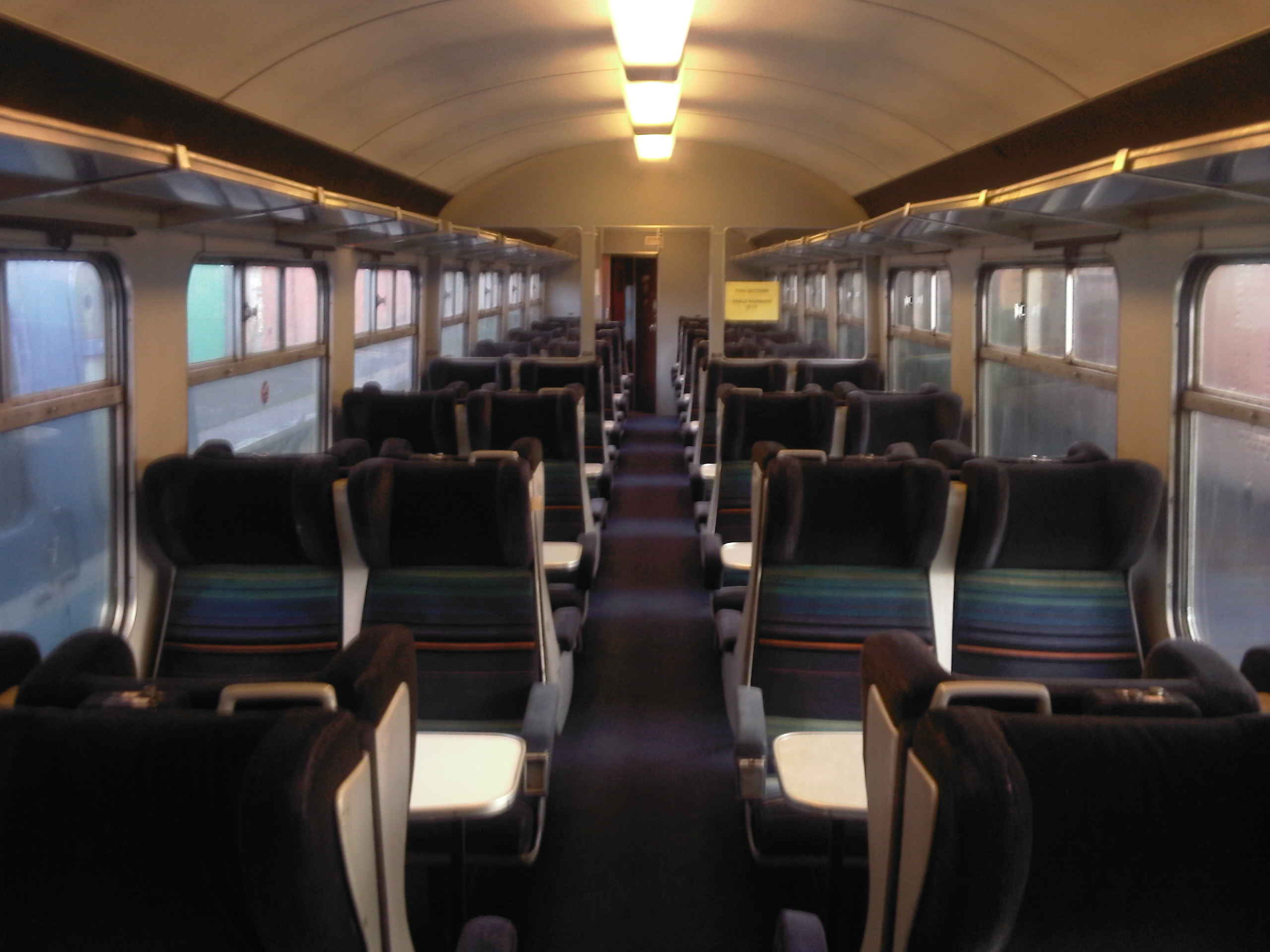
Interior detail of a Mark 2b TSO

The Mark 2 TSO was a direct development of the Mark 1 version, and the early Mark 2 TSOs (Mark 2 and Mark 2a) had an almost identical layout, including the pair of toilets either side of the gangway at one end and the two identical four-bay saloons separated by a just-off-mid-coach transverse vestibule, with further transverse vestibules at the outer end of each saloon. Unlike those in the Mark 1 TSOs, the Mark 2 saloons were not further subdivided. The Mark 2b design saw the centre vestibule abolished, although the mid-coach divider was retained to still give two saloons of four bays each. The space saved by the abolition of the centre vestibule was used to re-locate the toilets, with one now placed at each end, with the entrance vestibules beyond them. This enabled the fitting of wide wrap-round end doors in place of the traditional narrow ones. The basic layout of the Mark 2 TSO remained unaltered from the 2b to the 2f, although finish, materials, seating, and ventilation arrangements changed with each new build. Full details of the various changes are listed in the Mark 2 Development Table in the main Mark 2 article.

=== Usage ===
Mark 2 coaches gradually replaced Mark 1s on crack express services, allowing the older vehicles to cascade down to secondary services and thus enable the steady withdrawal of pre-nationalisation designs. Early Mark 2s were then in turn cascaded as later designs took over top-link workings. Air-conditioned Mark 2s generally worked in express trains on the great main lines, with pressure-ventilated Mark 2s used along with Mark 1 coaches on secondary services. Prior to the introduction of the HSTs, the standard Anglo-Scottish express train on the East Coast Main Line would be formed of a Deltic locomotive and eight air-conditioned Mark 2 coaches.

The final mainstay of Mark 2 operation, using Mark 2e and Mark 2f vehicles, were the inter-regional express trains on the West Coast Main Line (hauled by a variety of diesel and electric locomotives), and the Cross Country network, where they were usually hauled by Class 47 locomotives.

At the time of the privatisation of British Rail in the mid-1990s, Mark 2 TSOs were operated in sizable numbers by Anglia Railways, First Great Western, Gatwick Express, Virgin CrossCountry and Virgin Trains West Coast. Other operators including Abellio Greater Anglia, Abellio ScotRail, Arriva Rail North, Arriva Trains Northern, Arriva Trains Wales, First North Western, First ScotRail, Northern Rail, Silverlink, Transport for Wales Rail, Wales & Borders, Wales & West and Wessex Trains hired in Mark 2 TSOs at various points. As at September 2019, they only remained in service with Abellio ScotRail and Transport for Wales Rail.

Excursion trains still use a few members of the once widely operated fleet. Mark 2 coaches have also found favour with some heritage railways, one notable user being the Mid-Norfolk Railway, who have the NRM-owned prototype coach, and the Wensleydale Railway, who operate a small fleet of Mark 2 a/b vehicles.

== Mark 3 ==
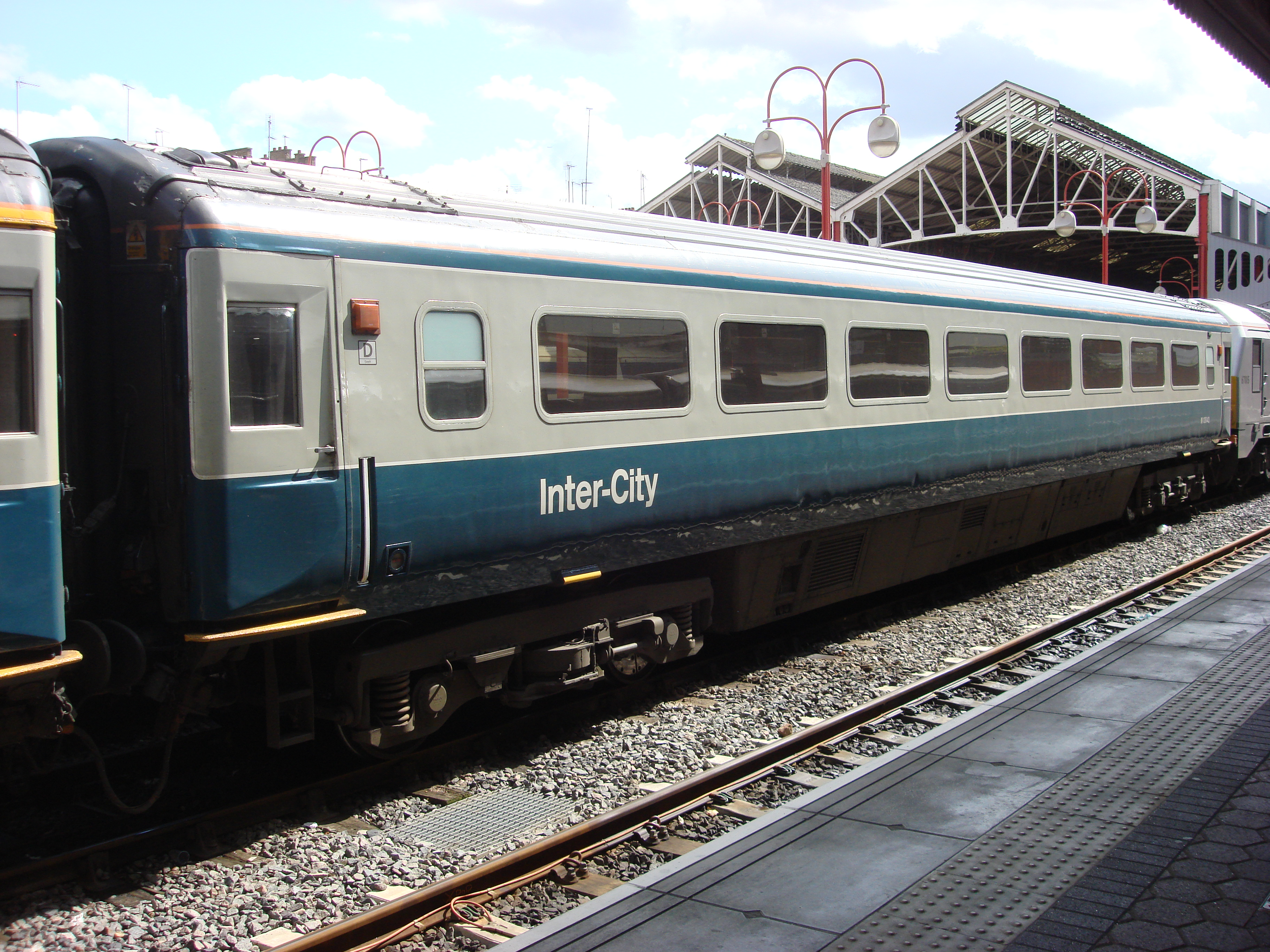
Cargo-D Mark 3A TSO at Marylebone

No HST carriages are designated TSO. They are classified as TS Trailer Second, reflecting the HST's initial DMU status.

The loco-hauled Mark 3 carriages (officially designated as Mark 3A or 3B) include vehicles classified as TSOs. They are referred to as Open Standard, the original meaning of TSO having become obsolete as no Mark 3 SO vehicles were constructed. Mark 3A TSO vehicles are numbered in the 12000-12172 range.

== Mark 4 ==
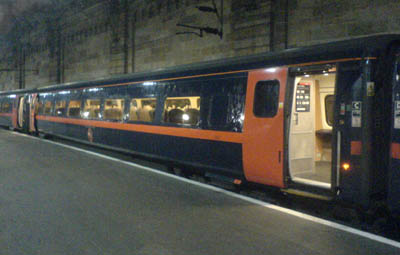
GNER Mark 4 TSO at Glasgow Central on 2 December 2006

As with Mark 3A vehicles, Mark 4 Open Standards carry the TSO designation. Further sub divisions exist: TSOE Open Standard (End) and TSOD Open Standard (Disabled Access). The TSOE vehicles are specifically designed to be adjacent to the train locomotive and were built with a single corridor connection at one end only. The other end of the coach has no corridor connection, just a small window and fixed taillights, although the structural arrangements to allow a corridor connection to be added if required at a later date are present. Mark 4 TSO vehicles are numbered in the 12200-12232 (TSOE), 12300-12331 (TSOD) and 12400-12538 (TSO) ranges.

== See also ==
- Open coach
