= Rolling stock of the Mid-Norfolk Railway =

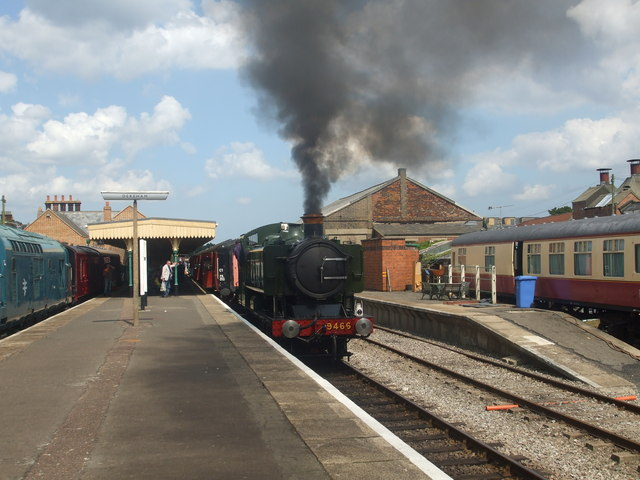
A range of items of MNR rolling stock, including visiting Pannier tank 9466, at Dereham, 2009

The Mid-Norfolk Railway has a large collection of heritage rolling stock, mostly relating to the post-war British Railways-era, from the 1950s to 1990s. The line holds several rolling-stock accomplishments:

- Owners of the first DMU vehicle to enter preservation.
- First Second Generation DMU used on a heritage railway.
- First complete set of coaches in the blue-grey livery on a heritage line.
- First complete set of coaches in the InterCity Executive livery on a heritage line.
- First heritage railway to operate an air-conditioned Mk2 carriage in service.
- First operational Mk3 carriage on a heritage line.

== Maintenance facilities ==
The main restoration depot is at Dereham. The three-road shed, built with a £100,000 European Union (EU) grant, has space to accommodate nine standard length coaches, steam or diesel locomotives. Additional secure storage sidings have been built near Kimberley, relating to a main-line contract. With the Mid-Norfolk being connected to the main Breckland secondary main line, the company's maintenance facilities are also employed for the regional Network Rail Rail Head Treatment Train (RHTT) during the autumn period.

== Locomotives and multiple units ==
=== Steam locomotives and shunters ===
Until 2019 there were no steam locomotives based on the line, with the Mid-Norfolk hiring steam locomotives based on other railways for use during the Summer season and most remaining services utilising diesel traction. Sentinel 4wVBT 9596 "George" and Robert Stephenson & Hawthorns 0-4-0ST 7818 "Castle Donington Power Station No. 2" are stored in the former yard at Yaxham, independently of the MNR. Great Western Railway 0-6-0 PT '9466' was a regular visitor to the line, but wasn't based at Dereham.

Number	Name	Description	Livery	Status	Notes	Picture
80078	-	BR Standard Class 4 2-6-4T	BR lined black	Operational	Built at Brighton Works in 1954 by British Railways. Privately owned. Current resident steam locomotive.	

=== Diesel locomotives and shunters ===
Number (Current number held)	Name	Description	Livery	Status	Notes	Picture
BSC 1	-	Hunslet 0-6-0 diesel	BSC yellow	Stored	English Electric Stephenson 0-6-0 diesel-hydraulic shunter BSC 1 was built at Vulcan Foundry, Lancashire for the British Steel Corporation (BSC) in 1965, upon completion she was allocated to Corby. During preservation, it is used for engineering trains only as it is not fitted with train brakes. Operated the first train into North Elmham yard since closure. Arrived at the MNR in January 2017	
D2063 03063	'Paul A. Mobbs'	BR 0-6-0 Class 03	British Rail Blue	Operational	03063 was released from Doncaster Work on 14 July 1959 originally as D2063, under Pre-TOPS, and was allocated to the York North (50A). In the July of 1968 the locomotive was fitted with a dual braking system which allowed it to shunt/haul air fitted stock. In February 1974 it was renumbered 03063 under the then new TOPS system. Over the course of its life it was transferred to various depots including Bradford Hammerton Street & Hull Botanic Gardens where it was then withdrawn in November 1987. Upon withdrawal from BR the locomotive was then sold into preservation. The locomotive was then bequeathed to the Mid-Norfolk Railway in 2023 upon the passing of it owner, the late Paul Mobbs. It was moved to the MNR in November 2023. In May 2024, during the Spring Diesel Gala, the locomotive was named 'Paul A. Mobbs' by the MNRPT Chairman, James Oakley, in memory of the former owner.	
D2334	-	BR 0-6-0 Class 04	British Railways Green *Late crest	Stored	British Rail Class 04 diesel-mechanical shunting locomotive D2334 was built by the Robert Stephenson & Hawthorn Company in 1961. Outshopped from Darlington Works in 1961, the 04 arrived at Heaton from new on 25 July. Moved on to Percy Main (North Shields ) on 8 June 1963, then to Gateshead on 30 January 1965, and finally to Darlington on 24 February 1968. Withdrawn from service in 1968 after which it was owned by the National Coal Board (Manvers Main Colliery in South Yorkshire, then Wath, followed by Thurcroft and finally Maltby) before being sold for preservation in 1985. Arrived at the MNR in January 2017.	
D6587 33202	'Dennis G. Robinson'	BR Bo-Bo Class 33	British Rail Blue	Operational	Built BRCW Works and released into service February 1962. First allocated to Hither Green. Named "The Burma Star" in July 1991, then "METEOR" in November 2002. Preserved February 2009. Arrived on the Mid-Norfolk Railway in 2018 to assist with the engineering work at Kimberley.	
D6703 37003		BR Co-Co Class 37	British Rail Blue	Undergoing restoration - off site	Built by English Electric Vulcan Foundry, as works number EE/VF2866/D582, 37003 was released to Stratford depot (30A) as D6703 on 28 December 1960. In April 1963 the locomotive was named "First East Anglian Regiment", but the name was never unveiled. At Tinsley in 1989 37003 was given the unofficial 'painted-on nameplate "TIGER MOTH", which was carried until she was overhauled at Doncaster in 1992. 37003 was withdrawn from traffic in 1994 and stored at Bescot and Crewe, until purchase by The Class 37 Locomotive Group in 1998. In 2012 the locomotive was named after Dereham Neatherd High School, with full nameplates and the school crest. Nameplates were removed in 2014.	
D1762 47167 47580 47732	'County Of Essex'	BR Co-Co Class 47	Monastral Blue (Platinum Jubilee variet)	Operational	Built by Brush at Loughborough as works number 524, D1762 was released to Tinsley in March 1964. It was allocated to Stratford TMD several times during its career. It was named County of Essex on 2 August 1979, the nameplates being removed in 1993. Renamed as "Restormel" in 1995. Stored as No. 47732 in April 2004, it was purchased by The Stratford 47 Group who preserved and brought it back into service; restored as "County of Essex" in 2008. This locomotive is mainline registered and is often operating away from its MNR base. Repainted with purple highlights for the Queen's Platinum Jubilee. In 2024 it was announced that the MNR had purchased both 47580 & 47596	
D1933 47255 47596	'Aldeburgh Festival'	BR Co-Co Class 47	BR Two Tone Green	Operational	Built by Brush at Loughborough as works number 695, D1933 was released to Bristol Bath Road in March 1966, although it was allocated to Stratford TMD several times during its career. It was named Aldeburgh Festival by Dr. Elizabeth Legg-Schwarzkopf, President of the Friends of Aldeburgh Festival on 8 June 1984, the nameplates being removed in 1993. The locomotive was withdrawn from service in October 2002 after three years in storage. The locomotive was then purchased by The Stratford 47 Group. The locomotive was painted back into its original British Rail Two Tone Green Livery in 2020. In 2024 it was announced that the MNR had purchased both 47580 & 47596	
D419 50019	'Ramillies'	BR Co-Co Class 50	British Rail Large logo Blue	Undergoing overhaul	The class were built for working passenger services on the West Coast Main Line (WCML) north of Crewe, to Preston, Lancaster, Carlisle and Glasgow Central, with the locomotive being originally allocated the running number D419. The locomotive was named after HMS Ramillies on 18 April 1978. In 1984 Ramillies was repainted in a variation of BR Blue by staff at Plymouth Laira depot. 50019 had visited East Anglia prior to preservation, being stabled at March depot in January 1987. Withdrawn for overhaul in 2013.	

=== Multiple units and railcars ===
Number	Description	Formed of	Livery	Status	Status	Photo
-	BR Class 100	56301	BR Green	On Display	Built in 1957. Used for static display – although proposed for eventual restoration. Trailer car 56301 was the first diesel multiple unit car to enter preservation in 1969, originally being used at the Chasewater Railway, before spending time at the Uranium Fuel Center, Salwick, and then having a period of storage at the King's Lynn Sugar Factory (between 1996 and 1997, while associated with the aborted National Diesel Railcar Museum project).	
101 695	BR Class 101	51499 + 51226	BR green *Late crest	Undergoing repairs	The former Corkerhill set 695 built 1958/59 arrived at the railway in late 2003. In the last years of its mainline service for Strathclyde PTE, 51226 was shown to have suffered minor damage to the cab end in the Class 101 fire at Mossend. It is owned by the MNRPT, and was repainted into its original green livery before entering service in Norfolk.	
L836	BR Class 101	51434 + 59117 + 51503	BR Blue & Grey	Non - Operational	51434 and 51503 came from set L836 built in 1959, the last Class 101 based at Norwich where it was used as a route learner. 59117 formed part of set L840 at Reading. They were formerly preserved at the Swindon and Cricklade Railway, owned by railwayman Matthew Smith. At his bequest they moved to Dereham in June '02, under the care of the Class 50 Locomotive Association, and the set has been posthumously named after him.	
101 663	BR Class 101	56347	BR green	Stored	Unpowered trailer car, previously used at Bressingham, before being sold to the Foxfield. Privately owned, and now used as an additional vehicle and spare trailer for the MNR DMUs.	
L233	BR Class 108	54270 + 51942	Unrestored	Stored	Preserved since 1994, but never restored to use. Privately owned, it arrived on the Mid-Norfolk in 2014 for restoration to passenger use.	
L432	Class 117	51370 + 51412	BR Green	Undergoing restoration	Preserved in 1994, at the Chasewater Railway, then at Titley Junction railway station, followed by the Whitwell & Reepham railway station, before Arriving at the MNR in November 2020, for restoration to passenger use. Although not an Eastern Region type, the class did operate between Birmingham and Norwich, and sister unit no. L411 (51346 + 59498 + 51388) visited the branch, as far as North Elmham, with the Hertfordshire Railtours 'Anglian Vibrator' railtour on 23 November 1985. Privately owned.	
142 038	BR Class 142/0	55629 + 55579	Northern Rail unbranded	Stored	The unit's body is based on that of the original Leyland National bus, and many fixtures and fittings of the bus can be found on the units. All 94 Class 142s were to be withdrawn by mid-2020, as they do not comply with the Persons with Reduced Mobility Technical Specification for Interoperability (PRM-TSI). Stored at Gascoigne Wood prior to delivery to the MNR in February 2020.	
142 061	BR Class 142/1	55711 + 55757	Northern Rail unbranded	Operational	Owned by the Mid Norfolk Railway. Stored at Gascoigne Wood prior to delivery to the MNR in September 2020, entering service in May 2021.	
144 018	BR Class 144	55818 + 55854 + 55841	Northern Rail unbranded	Stored	Owned by the Mid Norfolk Railway. The twelfth Class 144 Pacer to be preserved in the UK.	
9004	BR Class 419	68004	Green	Stored	Built for the boat trains from London Victoria to Dover and Folkestone, this unit was fitted with batteries to allow it to operate over short-distances of non-electrified line. Used as hauled stock, for Permanent way workings.	
320	BR Class 307	94320	Royal Mail	Stored	Built for use on electrified lines out of Liverpool Street as Class 307 driving trailer (DTCOL) 75120, converted for postal use as a Propelling Control Vehicle with a maximum speed of 40 mph when propelling and presently used for storage.	.

== BR Mk1 Carriages ==
British Railways Mark 1 is the family designation for the first standardised designs of railway carriages built by British Railways from 1951 until 1974. Following nationalisation in 1948, the Mark 1 was intended to be the standard carriage design for use across all lines, incorporating the best features of each of the former companies' designs. It was also designed to be much stronger than previous designs, to provide better protection for passengers in the event of a collision or derailment.

=== Passenger carrying vehicles ===
Current Number	Previous Number(s)	Designation	Built	Notes	Photo
E1842		RMB	1960; Wolverton	Dual braked, dual heated, owned by MNRPT. The Restaurant Miniature Buffet is a Tourist Standard Open (TSO) coach with two full seating bays next to the centre transverse vestibule removed and replaced with a buffet counter and customers standing space, and one bay on one side (same side as the buffet counter) removed and replaced with a store cupboard on the other side of the centre vestibule.	
1106	80020	'Booth Car'	1968; Horbury	Unique catering vehicle built by Chas Roberts on the underframe of Mk 1 RK 80020. Used on one of the Cambridge Buffet Car express sets. Under restoration, private owner	
1966		RU	1962; Swindon	Stored, owned by MNRPT This Restaurant Unclassified was fitted with a kitchen capable of providing cooked meals, and was later fitted with a buffet counter. Previously used as a workshop at Long Marston Exchange Sidings.	
E4702	E4702	TSO	1957; York	Vacuum braked, steam heated, owned by MNRPT. Previously on the Llangollen Railway.	
E9010	9369	BSOT	1963; Wolverton	Vacuum braked, steam heated, owned by MNRPT Converted into a microbuffet in 1980 as carriage number 9010. Converted in preservation into an accessible coach.	
M13225		FK	1959; Swindon	Dual braked, dual heated, owned by MNRPT. The coach underwent a 2-year overhaul of the interior and exterior from late 2020 to early 2023. The work was able to be completed via Government Covid Resilience Funding which was awarded by the National Lottery Heritage Fund.	
E14023	17023	BFK	1963 Swindon	Dual braked, dual heated, owned by MNRPT. The coach was purchased by the railway in September 2023 and repair work started work in Mid-September. The coach was released into traffic in June 2024 just in time for the MNR's Summer Steam Gala allowing for two vacuum braked maroon sets to be in service for the event.	
M16153		CK	1961; Derby	Vacuum braked, dual heated, owned by MNRPT	

=== Non-passenger carrying vehicles ===
Number	Previous Number(s)	Designation	Built	Notes	Photo
35341	NPCCS 80208; DB977908	BSK	1962; Wolverton	Former courier vehicle. Stored. Private owner.	
81014	84014; 95332; 95228	BG	1959; York	Dual braked, under restoration, private owner.	
99163	M25994; 18994	SK	1962; Derby	Former passenger carriage, now unbraked and in use as a static dormitory for railway staff members. Converted as a dormitory coach for The Travelling College in 1989. Private owner.	

== BR Mk2 Carriages ==
The Mark 2 family of railway carriages were British Rail's second design of carriages, built between 1964 and 1975. They were of steel construction. The MNR project to create a complete set of coaches in the blue-grey livery introduced in 1964 was a first in preservation. Several of the coaches feature Edward Pond murals fitted during refurbishment when in Network SouthEast service. A third set, owned by a group based on the line, was the first set in preservation to wear InterCity Executive livery.

=== Vacuum brake set ===
Number	Type	Designation	Built	Notes	Photo
13252	Mk2 Prototype	FK	1962; Swindon	Owned by MNRPT, originally preserved in 1982 at National Railway Museum, York. Moved to, and partially restored, at Steam Museum in 2000. Released from the National Collection, arriving on the MNR in 2009. Briefly in service in 2011, but then stopped for heavy overhaul.	
5211	Mk2	TSO	1966; Derby	Owned by MNRPT	
9409	Mk2	BSO	1966; Derby	Owned by MNRPT	
13446	Mk2	FK	1968; Derby	Owned by MNRPT	
13447	Mk2	FK	1968; Derby	Owned by MNRPT	

=== Air brake set ===
Number	Type	Designation	Built	Notes	Photo
5255	Mk2	SO	1966; Derby	Owned by the MNRPT	
5309	Mk2a	TSO	1968; Derby	Owned by the MNRPT	
5630	Mk2d	TSO	1971; Derby	Stored as spares vehicle, MNRPT	
3521	Mk2e	FOT	1973; Derby	Fitted with micro buffet in 1992, CDL-fitted, air conditioned, owned by the MNRPT	
9496	Mk2e	BSO	1972; Derby	CDL-fitted, air conditioned, owned by the MNRPT	
1218	Mk2f	RFB	1973; Derby	Converted 1989 to Buffet Open First for InterCity Cross Country. Formerly used on Liverpool Street to Norwich services. First preserved operational air-conditioned coach on a heritage line. CDL-fitted, air conditioned, owned by the MNRPT	

=== Non-passenger carrying vehicles ===
Number	Previous Number(s)	Type	Designation	Built	Notes	Photo
9423	025000	Mk2a	BSO	1967; Derby	Formerly an internal user at Preston Station as 025000. Sold 1994 from British Rail to Trainsrail, then EWS, then DBS. Arrived on the MNR in 08/12. Owned by Class 37 Group as support coach.	

== BR Mk3 Carriages ==
The Mid-Norfolk Railway also operates British Rail Mark 3 vehicles in service. The Mark 3 was developed in response to growing competition from airlines and the car in the 1960s. Originally conceived as locomotive-hauled coaching stock, the first coaches built, in 1972, were for the prototype HST. Production coaches entered service between 1975 and 1988. Mk3a FO 11024, a crash-damaged spares vehicle owned by National Express East Anglia, was stored on the MNR between 2008 and June 2010, and DVT 82104 was stored at Dereham during 2012, but neither was part of the railway's fleet.

=== Passenger Vehicles ===
Number	Previous number	Type	Designation	Built	Notes	Photo
10213	11050	Mk3a	RFM	1975; Derby	Converted 1984 from First Open to Restaurant First Modular (RFM). Became the first operational Mk3 carriage on a heritage railway. Air Brake, CDL-fitted, air conditioned, private owner.	
12008		Mk3a	TSO	1975; Derby	Air Brake, CDL-fitted, air conditioned, private owner	
12022		Mk3a	TSO	1975; Derby	Air Brake, CDL-fitted, air conditioned, private owner	
12063		Mk3a	TSO	Derby	Air Brake, CDL-fitted, air conditioned, owned by MNRPT.	
11006	11906	Mk3a	FO	1975; Derby	Previously Open Composite. Air Brake, CDL-fitted, air conditioned, private owner	
11011		Mk3a	FO	Derby	Air Brake, CDL-fitted, air conditioned, private owner	
12047		Mk3a	TSOD	Derby	Air Brake, CDL-fitted, air conditioned, private owner	

=== Refurbished Mark 3 Passenger Vehicles ===
In 2020 the railway purchased a fleet of 19 refurbished Mk3 carriages that had been retired from the Norwich to London services. These vehicles had been refurbished in 2016, fitted with eco-toilets, LED lighting and refreshed interiors.

Number	Previous number	Type	Designation	Built	Notes	Photo
10401	12168	Mk3a	TSOB 1	Derby	Air Brake, CDL-fitted, air conditioned, owned by MNRPT. Trailer Standard Open Buffet converted from a TSO.	
10405	12157	Mk3a	TSOB 1	Derby	Air Brake, CDL-fitted, air conditioned, owned by MNRPT. Trailer Standard Open Buffet converted from a TSO.	
10414	10216	Mk3a	TSOB 2	Derby	Air Brake, CDL-fitted, air conditioned, owned by MNRPT. Trailer Standard Open Buffet converted from a RFM by removing the kitchen equipment and replacing 24 First Class seats with 54 Standard Class seats.	
11067		Mk3b	FO	Derby	Air Brake, CDL-fitted, air conditioned, owned by MNRPT	
11069		Mk3b	FO	Derby	Air Brake, CDL-fitted, air conditioned, owned by MNRPT	
11100		Mk3b	FO(D)	Derby	Air Brake, CDL-fitted, air conditioned, owned by MNRPT, with wheelchair-accessible modular toilet during the 2016 refurbishment.	
12030		Mk3a	TSO	Derby	Air Brake, CDL-fitted, air conditioned, owned by MNRPT	
12031		Mk3a	TSO	Derby	Air Brake, CDL-fitted, air conditioned, owned by MNRPT	
12073		Mk3a	TSO	Derby	Air Brake, CDL-fitted, air conditioned, owned by MNRPT	
12105		Mk3a	TSO	Derby	Air Brake, CDL-fitted, air conditioned, owned by MNRPT	
12110		Mk3a	TSO	Derby	Air Brake, CDL-fitted, air conditioned, owned by MNRPT	
12129		Mk3a	TSO	Derby	Air Brake, CDL-fitted, air conditioned, owned by MNRPT	
12130		Mk3a	TSO	Derby	Air Brake, CDL-fitted, air conditioned, owned by MNRPT	
12132		Mk3a	TSO	Derby	Air Brake, CDL-fitted, air conditioned, owned by MNRPT	
12147		Mk3a	TSO	Derby	Air Brake, CDL-fitted, air conditioned, owned by MNRPT	

=== Refurbished Pullman Vehicles ===
Among the coaches purchased after use on Greater Anglia were four former InterCity Manchester Pullman coaches.

Number	Type	Designation	Built	Notes	Photo
11073	Mk3b	PFO	Derby	Formerly InterCity Pullman car "William Ewart Gladstone". Air Brake, CDL-fitted, air conditioned, owned by MNRPT	
11080	Mk3b	PFO	Derby	Formerly InterCity Pullman car "Emmeline Pankhurst". Air Brake, CDL-fitted, air conditioned, owned by MNRPT	
11081	Mk3b	PFO	Derby	Formerly InterCity Pullman car "Elizabeth Gaskell". Air Brake, CDL-fitted, air conditioned, owned by MNRPT	
11085	Mk3b	PFO(D)	Derby	Formerly InterCity Pullman car "Sir John Barbirolli". Air Brake, CDL-fitted, air conditioned, owned by MNRPT, with wheelchair-accessible modular toilet during the 2016 refurbishment.	

=== Driving Vehicle Trailers ===
Number	Type	Designation	Built	Notes	Picture
82112	Mk3b	DVT	1988; Derby	Air Brake, CDL-fitted, air conditioned, owned by MNRPT. A Driving Van Trailer (DVT) is a purpose-built control car railway vehicle that allows the driver to operate with a locomotive in push-pull formation from the opposite end of a train.	
82125	Mk3b	DVT	1988; Derby	Air Brake, CDL-fitted, air conditioned, private owner. Preserved in 2018, and became the first DVT preserved and, in April 2019, first to enter service on a heritage railway.	
82133	Mk3b	DVT	1988; Derby	Air Brake, CDL-fitted, air conditioned, owned by MNRPT	

=== Sleeping Cars ===
Number	Type	Designation	Built	Notes	Picture
10561	Mk3a	SLEP	Derby	Air Brake, CDL-fitted, air conditioned, owned by MNRPT	
10607	Mk3a	SLEP	Derby	Built 1983. Air Brake, CDL-fitted, air conditioned, owned by MNRPT	
10666	Mk3a	SLED	Derby	Built in 1981. Converted to provide easier access for disabled passengers, with wheelchair-accessible modular toilet and compartment. Air Brake, CDL-fitted, air conditioned, owned by MNRPT	

== Goods and engineering wagons ==
The Mid-Norfolk has a varied collection of goods wagons. They are usually used for works trains and demonstrations at various times of the year. This includes examples of covered and open wagons, tank wagons, including a milk tank wagon of the type once used over the line on the North Elmham milk trains and the following examples of brake vans.

Built for	Number	Type	Notes	Photo
Great Eastern Railway	1380	TY	Body only, originally an exhibition coach but now workshop and store Was formerly used as a residence, known as "Sunshine Villa" since 1928. When built would have operated in varnished teak, but was withdrawn wearing GER crimson.	
North Eastern Railway	-	BG	North Eastern Railway-designed full brake / ballast brake vehicle. Private owner.	
British Railways	DB 993717	Shark	A 20t Ballast Plough built by the Birmingham Railway Carriage and Wagon Company in 1952. Private owner.	
British Railways	B 954550	Standard	20t 4w Brake Van built at Faverdale Wagon Works in 1959 for British Railways. Private owner.	

== Cranes, runners and specialist plant ==
Built for	Number	Type	Notes	Photo
British Railways	DB 965153		10t 4w Self-Propelled Diesel Crane, built by Thomas Smith & Sons (Rodley) Ltd. Operates with 4 wheel ZSR Crane Runners DB 998508 and DB 998504. Currently undergoing repair/repaint. Owned by MNRPT	
LNER	497753	–	Wickham trolley	
LNER	M/C 3340	–	6t Motor Crane, built by Ransomes & Rapier. Believed ex-Dereham station. Not a rail-mounted vehicle.	
Great Eastern Railway	–	–	1t Horse-Drawn Yard Hand Crane. Ex-Watton station. Not a rail-mounted vehicle.	

== Former Mid-Norfolk Railway rolling stock ==
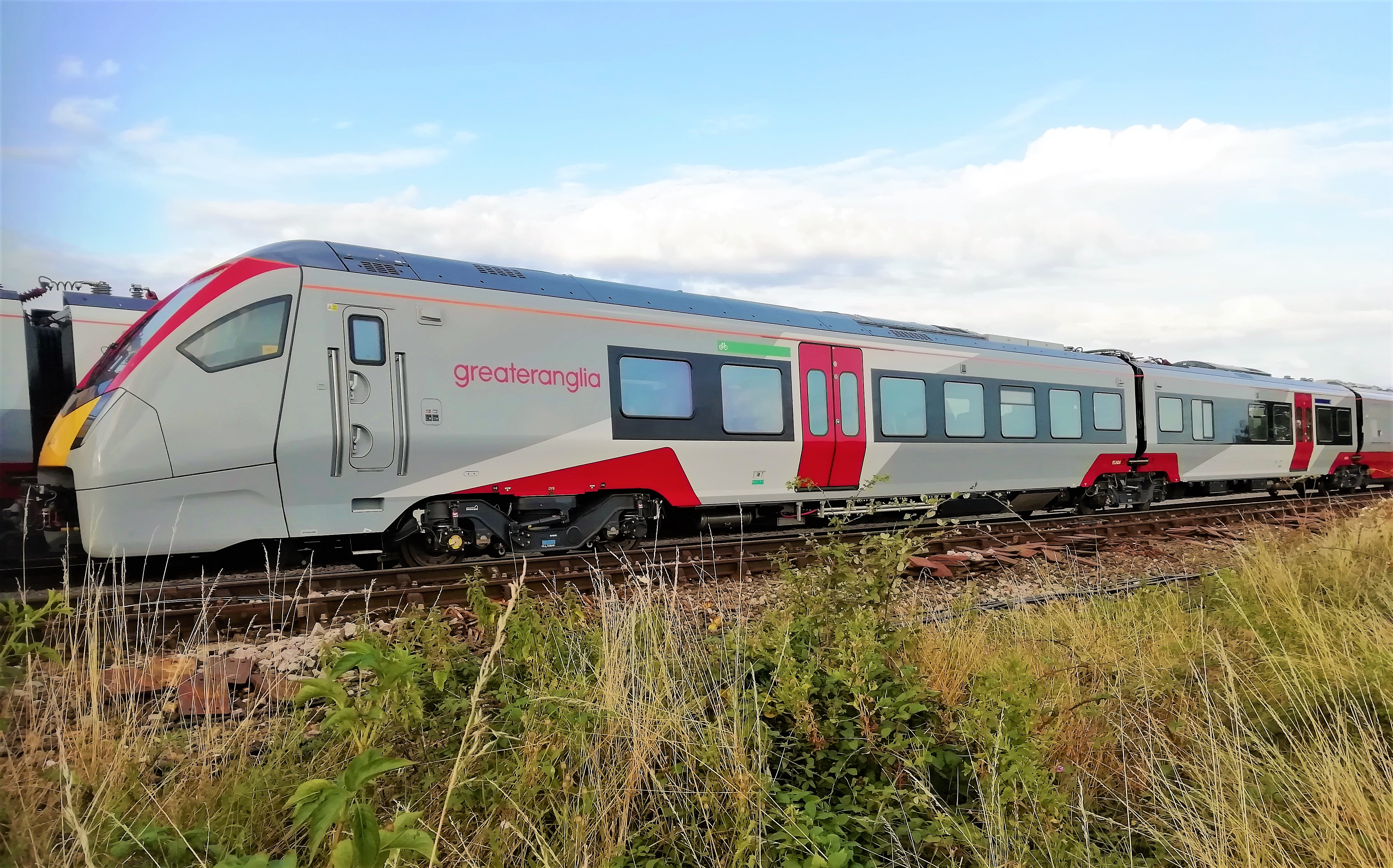
Class 755 unit stored on the Mid-Norfolk Railway prior to entering service

Since the preservation reopening of the line, several items of rolling stock have worked or been based on the Mid-Norfolk Railway, but have since departed. A number of vehicles have also been stripped and partially (or fully) scrapped on the railway. This section details those items (excluding visiting charter and freight locomotives).

Most of the Stadler FLIRT units being delivered to Greater Anglia were stabled on the line prior to entering service, with many of the retired Mk3 coaches also visiting, but these are not included in the records.

=== Steam locomotives and shunters previously based on the MNR ===
Number & Name	Description	Notes	Picture
2525	Cockerill 0-4-0 Tram Locomotive	Built in 1907, was stored out of use within sight of passing trains on the Mid-Norfolk and listed in the published stocklist for the line. It has now been restored and has operated on the MNR, though based at Yaxham and currently at the Mid Suffolk Light Railway.	
2857 'Swiftsure'	Hunslet Austerity 0-6-0 Saddle Tank Locomotive	Originally delivered to the War Department depot at Burton Dassett in Warwickshire. Later worked at Dodworth Colliery in Barnsley and at Cadley Hill Colliery near Swadlingcote in South Derbyshire. The locomotive has lived a transient life in preservation, being based on the Lavender Line in 1986, then Bodmin & Wenford Railway in 1987 until sold to the Strathspey Railway in 2006, then Peak Rail in 2013, the East Lancashire Railway in 2015 and then moving to the Nene Valley Railway by the end of that year. In 2017 the locomotive moved to the Dean Forest Railway. Based at Dereham from 2019 to 2021.	

=== Diesel locomotives and shunters previously based on the MNR ===
Number & Name	Description	Notes	Picture
1 'County School'	Ruston 0-4-0	Now Bressingham Steam Museum.	
03197	BR 0-6-0 Class 03	Arrived at the MNR in 2018 to assist with the engineering work at Kimberley Park. Left The Mid-Norfolk Railway in July 2025.	
08631 'Eagle'	BR 0-6-0 Class 08	While in use at Cambridge Depot the locomotive was named after the only railway loco built in Cambridge, by Hedley Bros at the Eagle Foundry in 1845, for the Norfolk Railway. Preserved 2007, but frequently hired out for mainline use. Sold by owner in 2015, having not been seen at Dereham for a number of years.	
08847	BR 0-6-0 Class 08	Main-line registered locomotive, temporarily based and operating at Dereham following use at Norwich Crown Point.	
D9520	BR 0-6-0 Class 14	Originally allocated to Hull (Dairycoates) on the Eastern Region, then used by British Steel Ltd at Corby Steelworks and at Glendon. Previously based on the Nene Valley Railway. Privately owned. Arrived at MNR in June 2021.	
20069	BR Bo-Bo Class 20	Delivered to County School station on 19 June 1992. Sold out of preservation in 2016, and leaving the railway in 2020.	
20206	BR Bo-Bo Class 20	Scrapped, Booth's of Rotherham (2004).	
31235/D5695	BR A1A-A1A Class 31/1	31235 arrived on the Mid-Norfolk on 29 March 2000, having been in store at Carlisle for five years. It was sold in 2016.	
31255	BR A1A-A1A Class 31	Arrived in 2016 under ownership of Harry Needle Railroad Company. Bought by a private party in 2020, sold again in 2025 and departed in April 2025.	
31530/D5695 'Sister Dora'	BR A1A-A1A Class 31/5	Arrived December 2002, restoration never completed, departed 2013. To Mangapps Railway Museum.	
31438/D5557	BR A1A-A1A Class 31/4	Arrived 2001, sold 2011. To Epping Ongar Railway.	
37099 'Clydesbridge'	BR Co-Co Class 37	Displayed, unrestored, at Norwich Road level crossing in Dereham, then moved to North Norfolk Railway, but operated on neither line.	
47367	BR Co-Co Class 47	The locomotive was then purchased by The Stratford 47 Group and brought to the MNR in 2014. Was sold and left the MNR in August 2025.	
56040 'Oystermouth'	BR Co-Co Class 56	Bought by the Class 56 Group, arriving in September 2006. Sent to the Battlefield Line Railway for repairs in August 2009 but was later scrapped.	
56101 'Mutual Improvement'	BR Co-Co Class 56	Cover for withdrawn 56040 until April 2011, then moved by rail to Barrow Hill then sold out of preservation and exported to Hungary.	
73210 'Selhurst'	BR Bo-Bo Class 73	73210 arrived by rail behind sister 73136 in 2008. In 2018 it moved to the Ecclesbourne Valley Railway.	

=== Multiple units and railcars previously based on the MNR ===
Number	Description	Formed of	Notes	Photo
–	BR Class 108	51572 + 56224	Now Wensleydale Railway / Ecclesbourne Valley Railway	
-	BR Class 117	51360	Now Gloucestershire Warwickshire Railway.	
L409 'Fran'	BR Class 117	51386	Scrapped, Dereham (2003)	
-	BR Class 119	51073	Now Ecclesbourne Valley Railway	
P106	BR Class 122	55006	Now Ecclesbourne Valley Railway	
P109	BR Class 122	55009	Arrived on the Mid-Norfolk Railway in 1997. Never entered service and departed for Great Central Railway in 2020.	
141108	BR Class 141	55508 + 55528	In 2002, when based on the MNR, it became the first Pacer to enter public service. Then Colne Valley Railway before passing to mainline company Locomotive Services. Moved to Eastleigh Works in 2020.	
5176	BR Class 415	14351 + 15396 + 14351 + 15354	Now Northamptonshire Ironstone Railway Trust / Electric Railway Museum, Warwickshire	
9003	BR Class 419	68003	Now Eden Valley Railway	
1497	BR Class 421	76764+62402+69318+76835	Now Spa Valley Railway	

=== Carriages & Wagons previously based on the MNR ===
Number	Type	Designation	Notes
80740	Mk1	BG	Former Sandite vehicle, scrapped at Dereham in 2003, after restoration halted.
4614	Mk1	TSO	To Gloucestershire Warwickshire Railway, April 2015
25631	Mk1	SK	Privately owned, sold to Aln Valley Railway.
35006	Mk1	BSK	To Ecclesbourne Valley Railway, 2016.
1689	Mk1	RBR	Sold to Wensleydale Railway in 2017.
35270	Mk1	BSK	Delivered to County School as privately owned luxury saloon, then to Wymondham as holiday home. Now North Yorkshire Moors Railway.
25231	Mk1	SK	Purchased as spares donor, scrapped at Booth's, Rotherham, by 05/15.
9406	Mk2	BSO	Arrived 2012, never used on MNR fleet. Sold to Telford Steam Railway, leaving January 2017.
5211	Mk2	TSO	Left MNR in August 2024
5267	Mk2a	TSO	Purchased as donor vehicle. Broken up for spare parts early 2009
5480	Mk2b	TSO	Broken up for parts, September 2011
5497	Mk2b	TSO	To Great Central, August 2009
5536	Mk2c	TSO	Broken up for parts, Spring 2009
6356	Mk2c	BSO	Broken up for parts, Summer 2009
ADB977390	Mk2c	FO	Arrived in poor condition in 2012. Stored, unrestored, for private owner. Departed, unrestored, 2020.
6357	Mk2c	BSO	Initially preserved, but broken for parts in 2012.
ADB977595	Mk2d	FK	Arrived in poor condition in 2009. Stored for private owner. Departed, unrestored, 2020.

==== Eastern Rail Services vehicles ====
While the company was being established, a number of vehicles owned by Eastern Rail Services were operated or stored on the line.

Number	Type	Designation	Notes	Photo
86226	Mk1	GUV	Built 1958, by Pressed Steel. Used as private stores vehicle and sold to private owner in 2021.	
1692	Mk1	RBR	Dual brake. Stored, unrestored, at MNR from 2017 to 2020.	
35292	Mk1	BSK	Former Post Office courier vehicle. Stored, unrestored, on MNR from May 2013 to December 2020.	
3133	Mk1	FO	Ex-Riviera Trains, used in Set OC91. Stored, partially restored but out of use, on MNR from 2017. To Bo'ness, partially restored, in 2020.	
5265	Mk2a	TSO	Privately owned, used as the fifth coach of the Railway's air-braked blue/grey Mk2 set of carriages.	
17079	Mk2a	BFK	Privately owned, used on the Railway's air-braked blue/grey Mk2 set of carriages.	
5446	Mk2b	TSO	Privately preserved, and stored, unrestored, on the line from 2008 until sold to PNP Events, in Telford, April 2021	
9448	Mk2c	BSO	Stored on line from 2009, but never restored by owners. To ERS Great Yarmouth depot 2020.	
3181	Mk2d	FO	Air Brake, CDL-fitted, air conditioned, to Nemesis Rail after storage on MNR	
5647	Mk2d	TSO	Ex-Riviera Trains, in Oxford Blue and Cream. Air Brake, CDL-fitted, air conditioned. Stored at MNR when not at Dartmoor for Polar Express duties.	
5732	Mk2d	TSO	Acquired as spares vehicle, scrapped during 2011.	
9500	Mk2e	BSO	Air Brake, CDL-fitted, air conditioned, restored on MNR before moving to Weardale Railway	
9505	Mk2e	BSO	Acquired as spares vehicle during 2012, scrapped 2016.	
5906	Mk2e	TSO	Air Brake, CDL-fitted, air conditioned, kept on MNR when not in use at Weardale Railway	
5866	Mk2e	TSO	Air Brake, CDL-fitted, air conditioned	
9497	Mk2e	BSO	Air Brake, CDL-fitted, air conditioned, to Weardale Railway	
5989	Mk2f	TSO	Air Brake, CDL-fitted, air conditioned, to Weardale Railway	
6059	Mk2f	TSO	Air Brake, CDL-fitted, air conditioned, to Weardale Railway	
5960	Mk2f	TSO	Air Brake, CDL-fitted, air conditioned,	
6168	Mk2f	TSO	Air Brake, CDL-fitted, air conditioned, to Weardale Railway	

==== Riviera Trains vehicles ====
Spot-hire carriages owned by Riviera Trains were based on the line until 2022, for use on special events.

Number	Type	Designation	Notes	Picture
3417	Mk2f	FO	Air Brake, CDL-fitted, air conditioned, maintained in former Anglia Railways livery as part of Riviera Trains' Norfolkman set of air-conditioned Mk2 vehicles.	
3379	Mk2f	FO	Air Brake, CDL-fitted, air conditioned, maintained in former Anglia Railways livery as above.	
3334	Mk2f	FO	Air Brake, CDL-fitted, air conditioned, maintained in former Anglia Railways livery as above.	
3336	Mk2f	FO	Air Brake, CDL-fitted, air conditioned, maintained in former Anglia Railways livery as above.	

=== Visiting steam locomotives ===
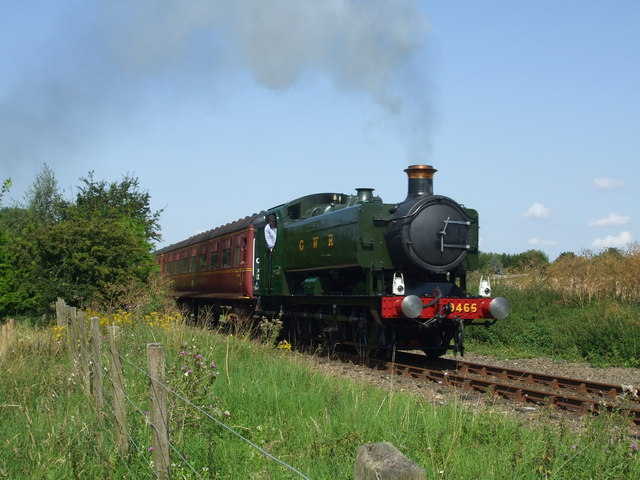
9466 leaving Kimberley Park, 2009

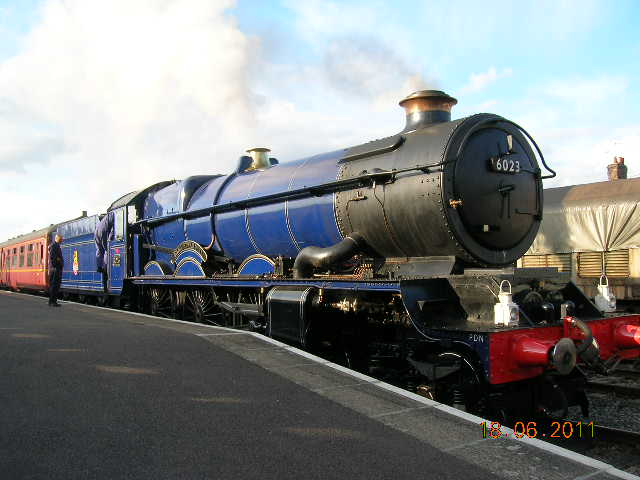
King Edward II at Dereham, 2011

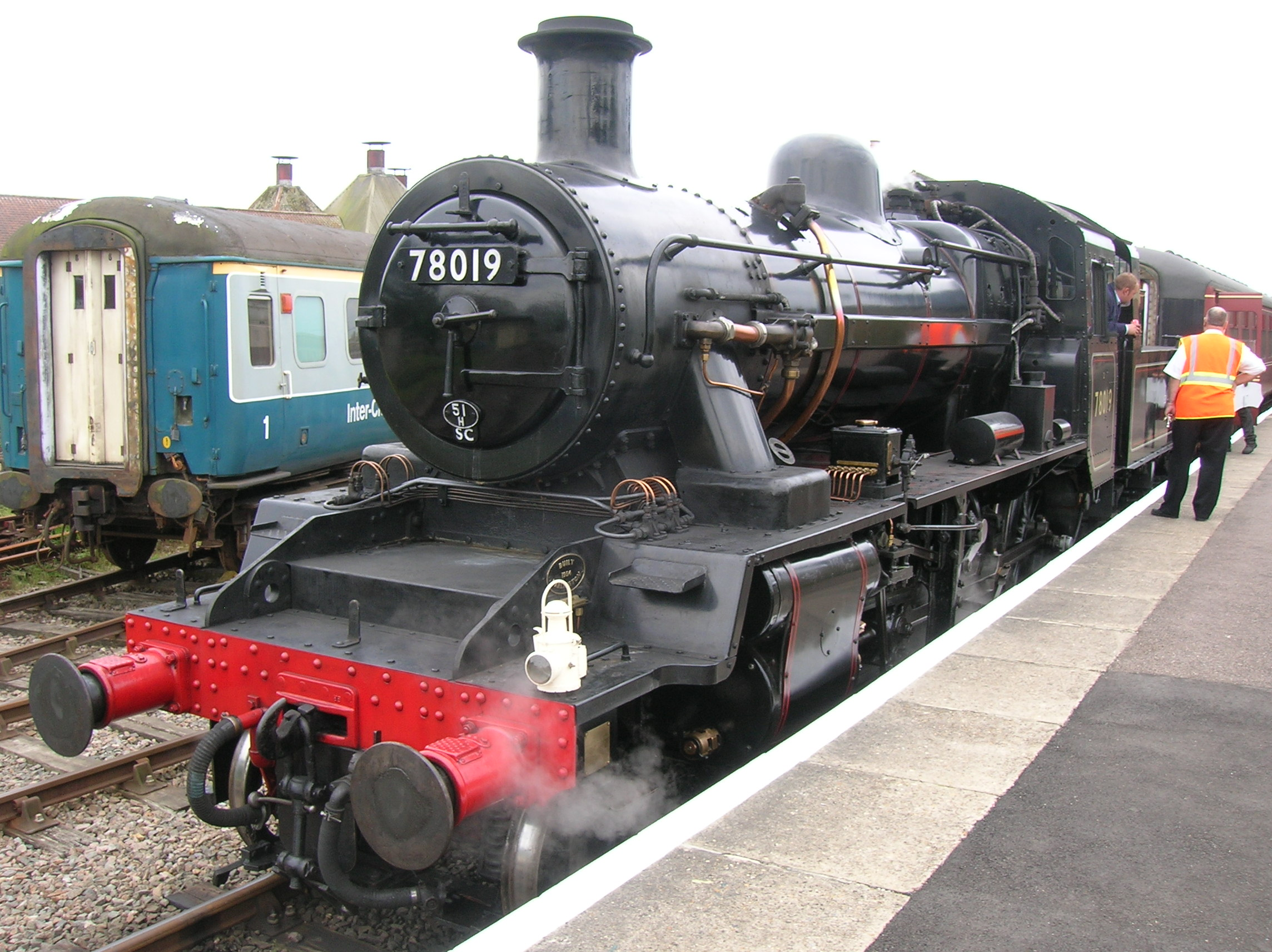
78019 at Dereham, 2012

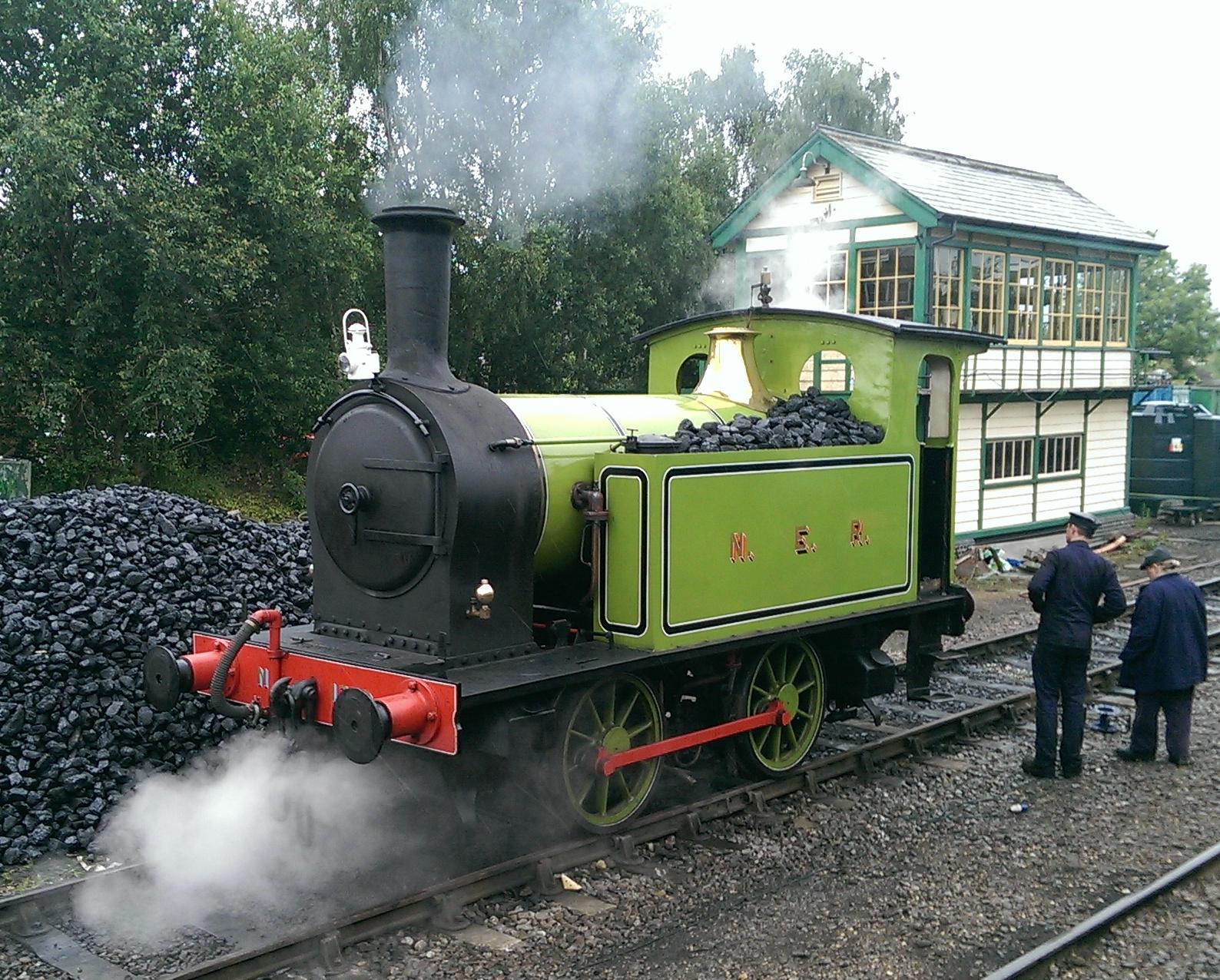
NER 1310 at Dereham, 2014

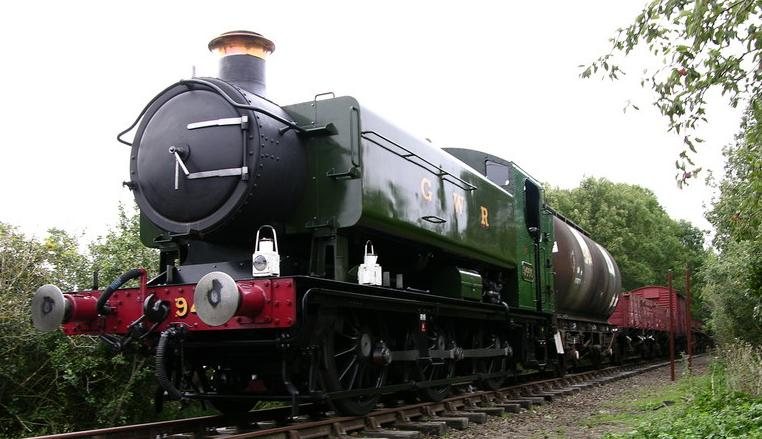
GWR 9466 is seen at Hoe level crossing

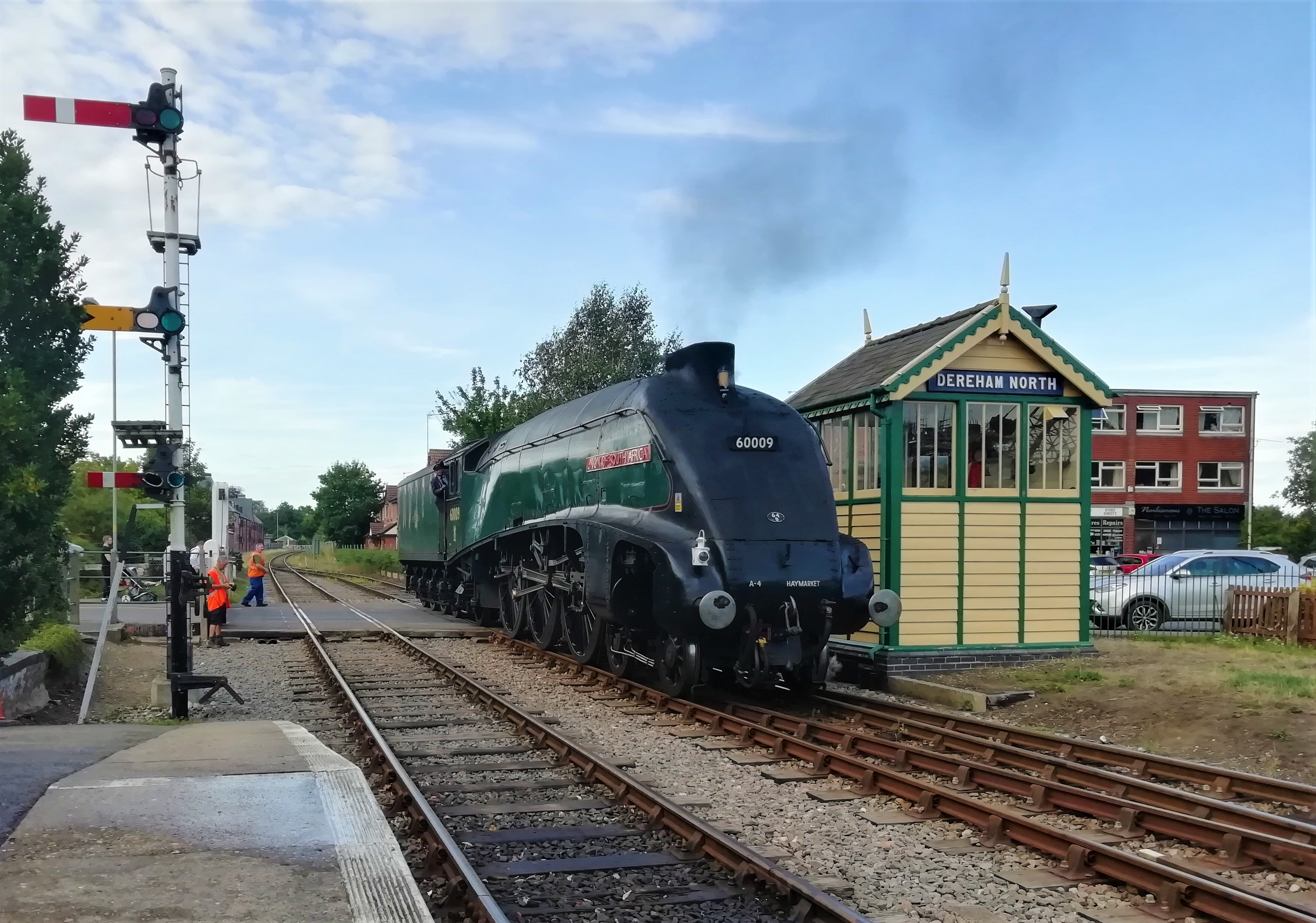
60009 at Dereham, 2019

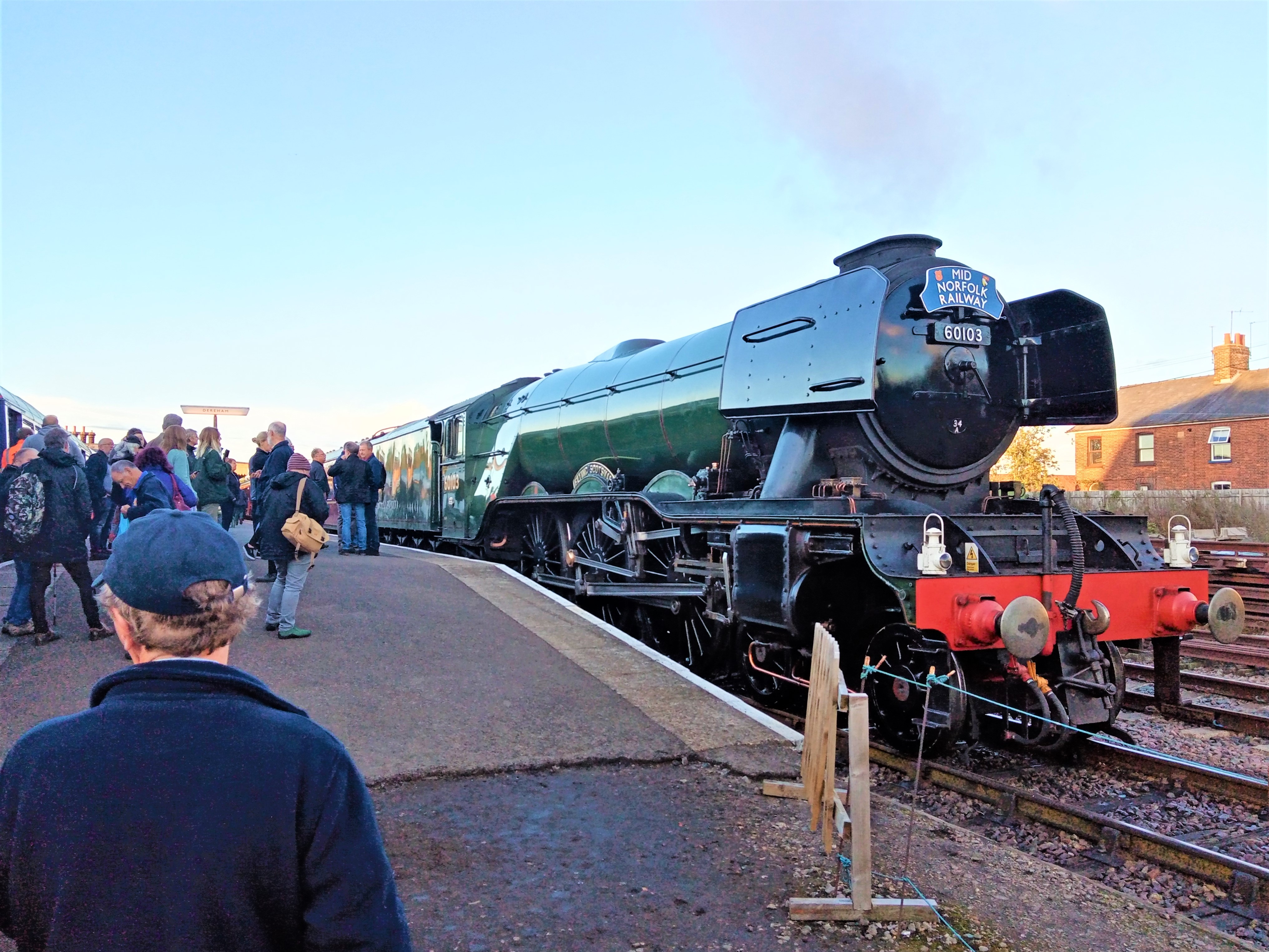
60103 at Dereham, 2021

Visiting steam locomotives that have operated on the preserved Mid-Norfolk Railway are shown in the following table:

Year	Number & Name	Locomotive / Unit Type	Notes
1997	Sir Berkeley	MW 0-6-0 ST	Hauled first passenger services from restored Dereham station.
2000	Little Barford	Barclay 0-4-0 ST	Used for crew training and evaluation.
2001	61264	LNER 4-6-0, B1 Class	Routed via Dereham for repairs after failing on railtour at Norwich, 20 November.
2004	61264	LNER 4-6-0, B1 Class	Routed via Dereham for repairs after colliding with buffers at Norwich.
2006	9466	GWR 0-6-0 9400 Class	First scheduled steam service between Dereham and Wymondham since 1955.
2007	9466	GWR 0-6-0 9400 Class	Operated MNR steam services June/July.
2007	34067 Tangmere	SR 4-6-2, Battle of Britain Class	Hauled the first steam charter from Dereham (to London Liverpool Street), 5 May.
2008	9466	GWR 0-6-0 9400 Class	Operated MNR steam services July/August.
2009	69621	LNER 0-6-2, N7	Operated weekend services, 25 April – 4 May
2009	70013 Oliver Cromwell	BR 4-6-2 Standard Class 7	Stabled at Dereham for a week in early May, planned service trains cancelled.
2009	9466	GWR 0-6-0 9400 Class	Operated MNR steam services July/August.
2010	9466	GWR 0-6-0 9400 Class	Operated MNR steam services July/August.
2011	6023 King Edward II	GWR 4-6-0 6000 Class	Operated MNR steam services June/July 2011.
2011	9466	GWR 0-6-0 9400 Class	Operated MNR steam services July/August 2011.
2011	47406	LMS 0-6-0 3F Class	Operated MNR steam Gala 2011.
2012	9466	GWR 0-6-0 9400 Class	Operated MNR steam services June and August.
2012	78019	BR Standard Class 2 2-6-0	Operated MNR steam services in June 2012.
2012	1306 Mayflower	LNER Class B1 4-6-0	Operated MNR steam services in July 2012.
2012	1744	LNER Class N2 0-6-2	Operated MNR steam services in July 2012.
2013	9466	GWR 0-6-0 9400 Class	Operated MNR steam services June to August.
2013	46233 Duchess of Sutherland	LMS Princess Coronation Class	Operated MNR steam gala in July 2013.
2013	61306 Mayflower	LNER Class B1 4-6-0	Operated MNR steam gala in July 2013.
2013	30053	Southern Railway Class M7	Operated MNR steam gala in July 2013.
2014	48624	LMS Stanier 8F	Operated MNR steam services for Peppa Pig weekend, 24–26 May 2014, in replacement of N2 1744.
2014	45699 Galatea	LMS Jubilee Class	Operated MNR West Coast steam gala, 30–31 May & 1 June 2014.
2014	46115 Scots Guardsman	LMS Royal Scot Class	Operated MNR West Coast steam gala, 30–31 May & 1 June 2014.
2014	48151	LMS Stanier 8F	Operated MNR West Coast steam gala, 30–31 May & 1 June 2014.
2014	60009 Union of South Africa	LNER Class A4	Operated MNR Summer Steam Gala, 26–30 June 2014. 2525 remained at Dereham after this event.
2014	61994 The Great Marquess	LNER Class K4	Operated MNR Summer Steam Gala, 26–30 June 2014. 2525 remained at Dereham after this event.
2014	1310	NER Class H	Operated MNR Summer Steam Gala, 26–30 June 2014. 2525 remained at Dereham after this event.
2014	1744	GNR Class N2	Operated MNR Summer Steam Gala, 26–30 June 2014. 2525 remained at Dereham after this event.
2014	2525	Cockerill vertical boilered well tank	Operated MNR Summer Steam Gala, 26–30 June 2014. 2525 remained at Dereham after this event.
2015	10 Cumbria	Hunslet Austerity 0-6-0ST	Booked for main steam season.
2015	5542	GWR 4575 Class	Visited for the MNR steam gala on 19–21 June 2015.
2015	46233 Duchess of Sutherland	LMS Princess Coronation Class	Visited for the MNR steam gala on 19–21 June 2015.
2016	9466	GWR 0-6-0 9400 Class	Operated MNR steam services.
2016	46233 Dutchess of Sutherland	LMS Princess Coronation Class	Visited for the MNR steam gala in 2016.
2016	46100 Royal Scot	LMS Royal Scot Class	Visited for the MNR steam gala in 2016.
2017	9466	GWR 0-6-0 9400 Class	Operated MNR steam services.
2017	60009 "Union of South Africa"	LNER Class A4	Visited for the MNR steam gala in 2017.
2017	Stewart and Lloyds 62 (7673) Ugly	RS&H 0-6-0 ST	Visited for the MNR steam gala in 2017.
2018	9466	GWR 0-6-0 9400 Class	Operated MNR steam services.
2018	75008 Swiftsure	Hunslet Austerity 0-6-0ST	Operated MNR steam services.
2018	80078	BR Standard Class 4 2-6-4T	Visited for the late-season MNR steam gala in 2018.
2019	80078	BR Standard Class 4	Operated MNR steam services.
2019	2238	NER Class T2	Visited for the MNR Summer steam gala in 2019.
2019	5197	USATC Class S160	Visited for the MNR Summer steam gala in 2019.
2019	60009 Union of South Africa	LNER Class A4	Operated MNR services late August.
2020	80078	BR Standard Class 4	Operated MNR staff training service. Remained on line as a resident engine.
2021	813	GWR/PTR 0-6-0ST	Operated various MNR steam services from July to September.
2021	60103 "Flying Scotsman"	LNER Class A3	Operating during Autumn. Originally booked for 2020.
2021	24564	North British 0-6-0T "Coventry No.1"	Static display during The Polar Express™ Train Ride season.
2022	3844	Hunslet Engine Company 0-6-0ST "United Steel Company 22"	Worked some services during the 2022 season.
2022	1919	Avonside Engine Company 0-6-0ST "Cranford"	Static display during The Polar Express™ Train Ride season.
2024	4144	GWR Large Prairie 41xx 2-6-2	Visited for the MNR Summer Steam Gala in 2024 and operated 1 day of regular MNR Steam Services.
2024	34072 "257 Squadron"	Southern Railway - Bullied "Battle of Britain Class" 4-6-2	Visited for the MNR Summer Steam Gala in 2024 and operated 1 day of regular MNR Steam Services.
2024	4144	GWR Large Prairie 41xx 2-6-2	Returned for 1940s weekend (3rd & 4th Aug)
2025	41313	LMS Class 2 Ivatt 2-6-2	Visited for MNR Summer Southern Steam Gala.
2025	31806	SR U Class	Visited for MNR Summer Southern Steam Gala.
2025	34053 'Sir Keith Park'	Southern Railway - Bullied "Battle of Britain Class" 4-6-2	Visited for MNR Summer Southern Steam Gala. Under the guise of 34050 'Royal Observer Corps for the Steam Gala. She was also used for a special running weekend in July (26th & 27th). Remained at MNR until 1940s Weekend (1st & 2nd Aug)
2025	34053 'Sir Keith Park'	Southern Railway - Bullied "Battle of Britain Class" 4-6-2	

=== Visiting diesel and electric locomotives ===
In addition to locomotives based on the line, the Mid-Norfolk Railway has hired a number of diesels to operate service and special event trains. Visiting diesel locomotives that have operated service trains on the preserved Mid-Norfolk Railway are shown in the following table:

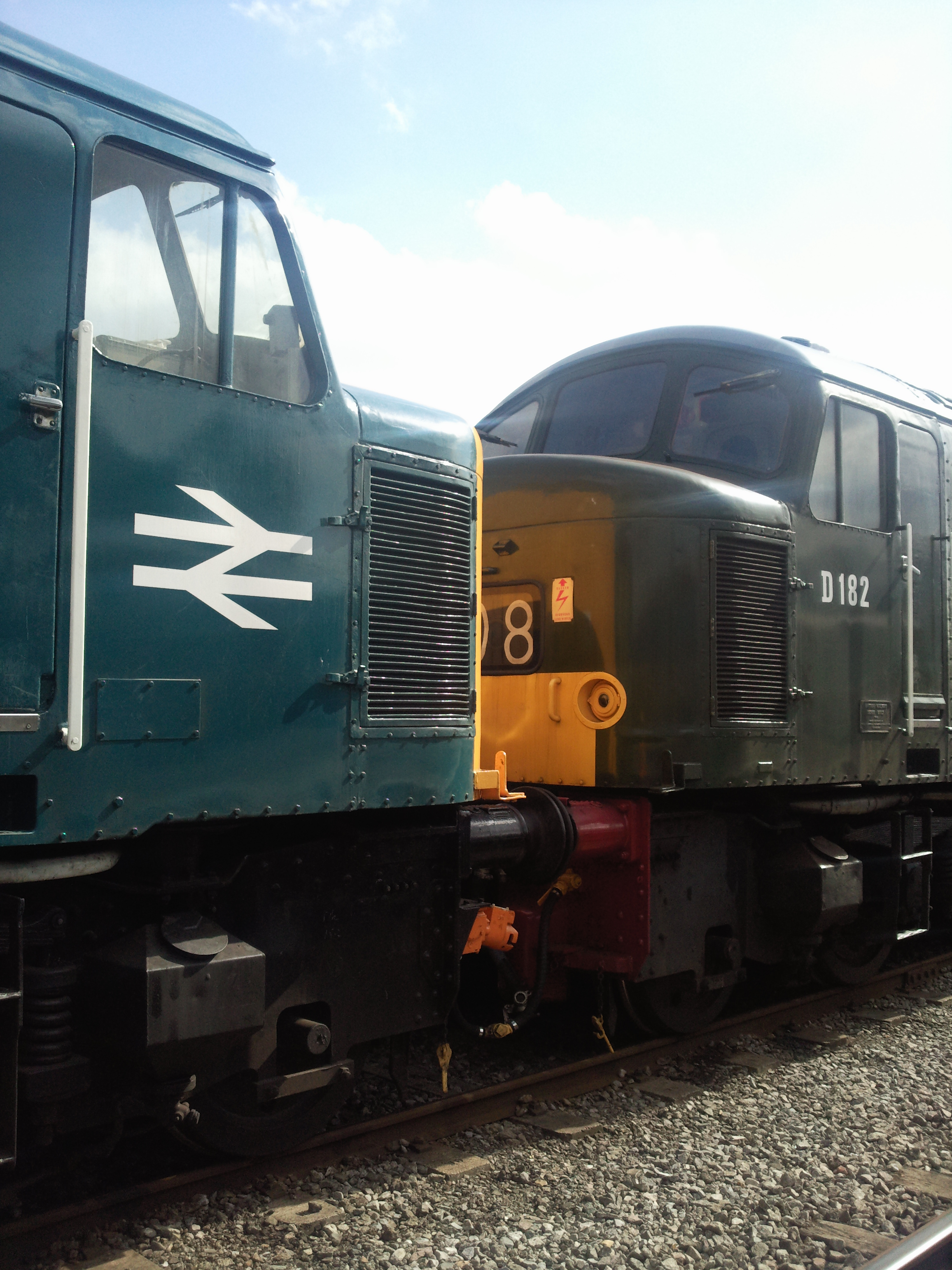
Classes 45 and 46 at Dereham, Spring Gala 2010

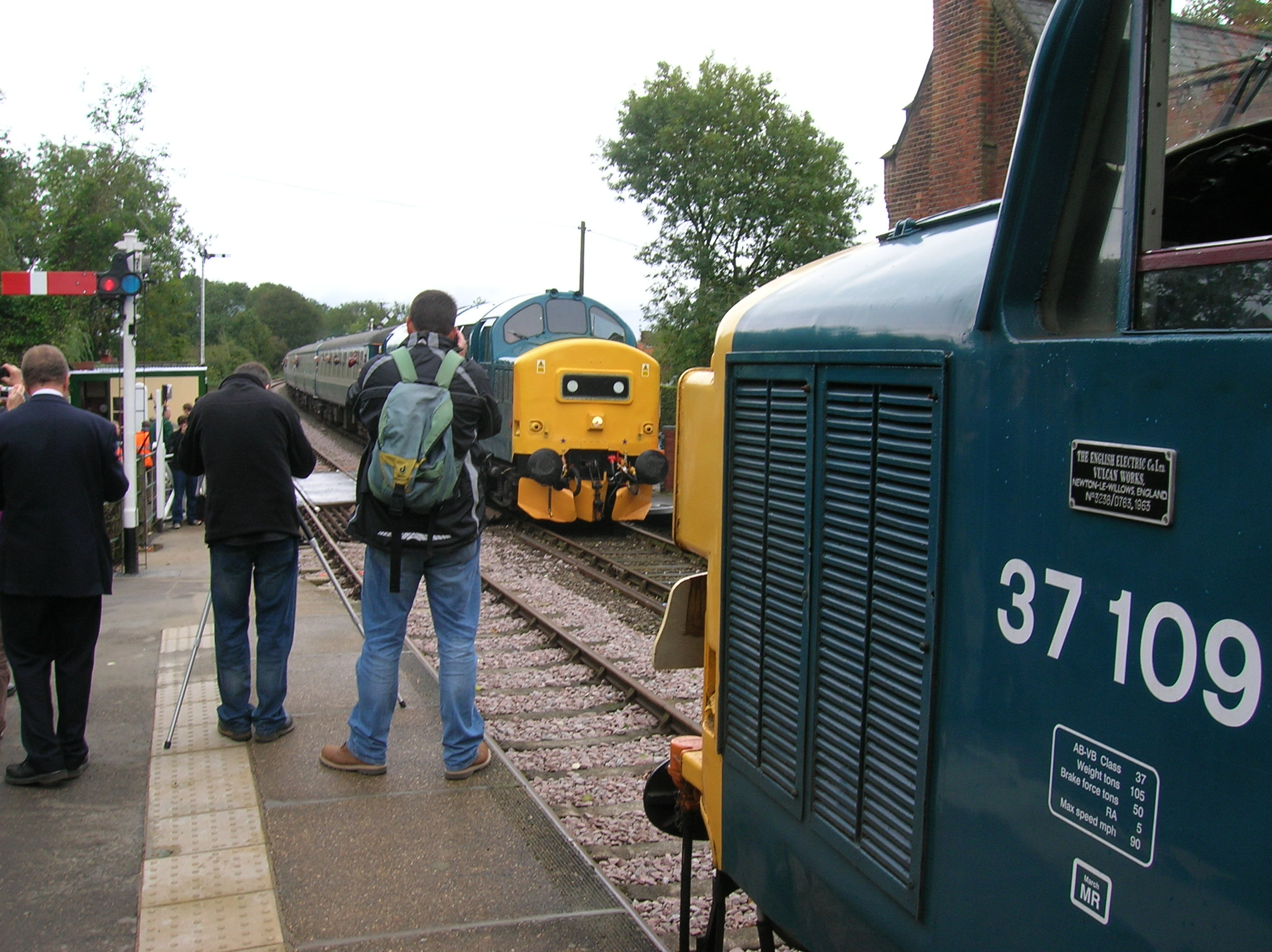
Class 37s at Thuxton, Autumn Gala 2010

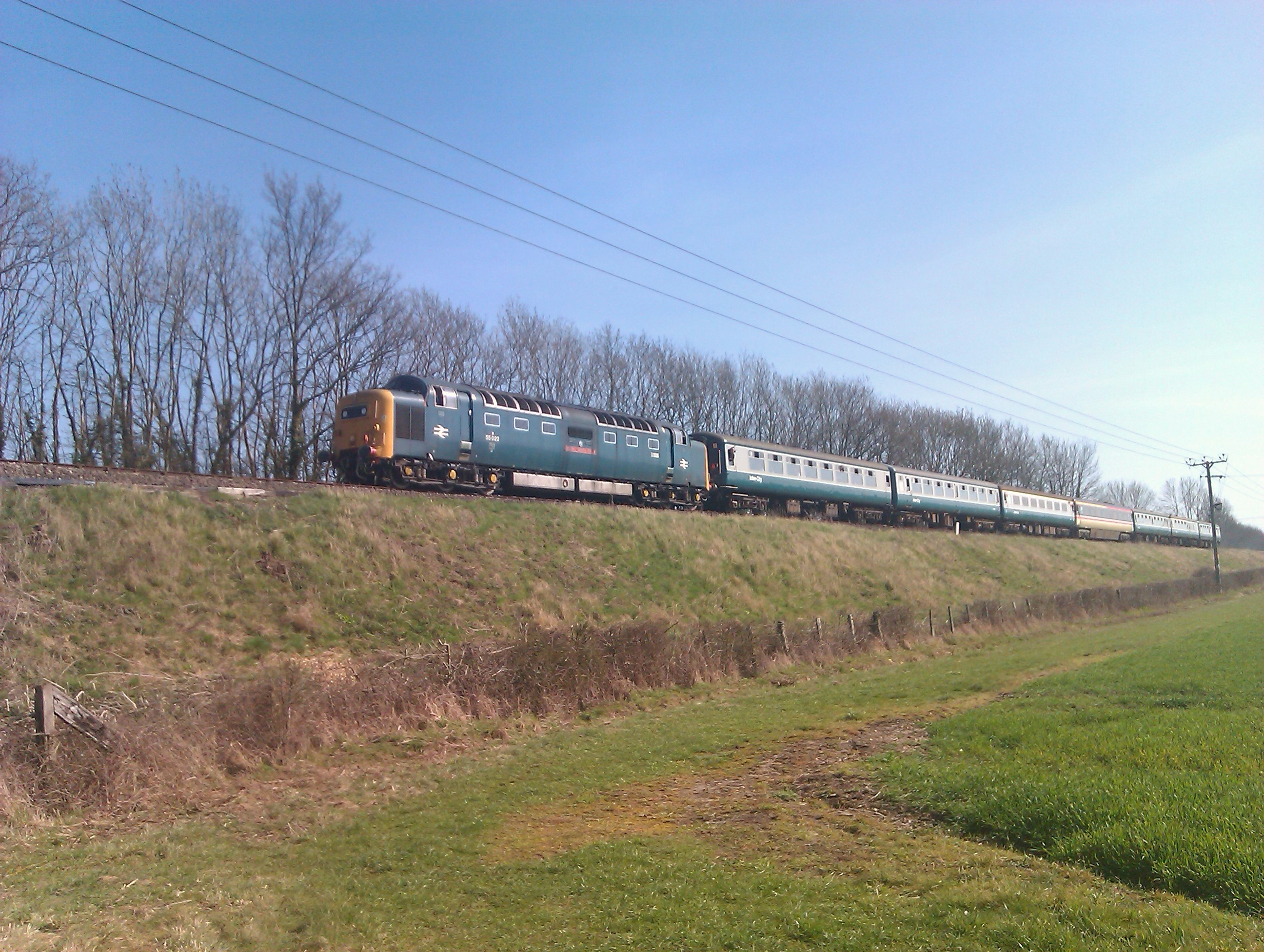
Class 55 approaching Dereham, April 2012

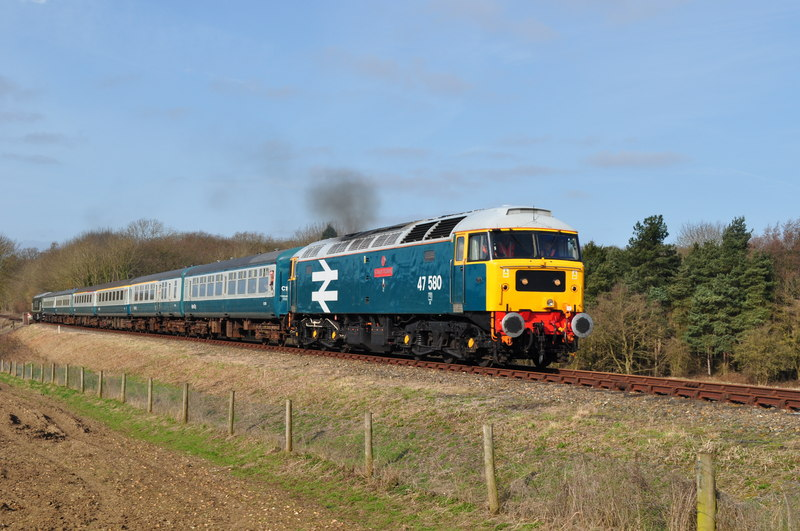
47580 on the morning service to Wymondham Abbey, 19 March 2010

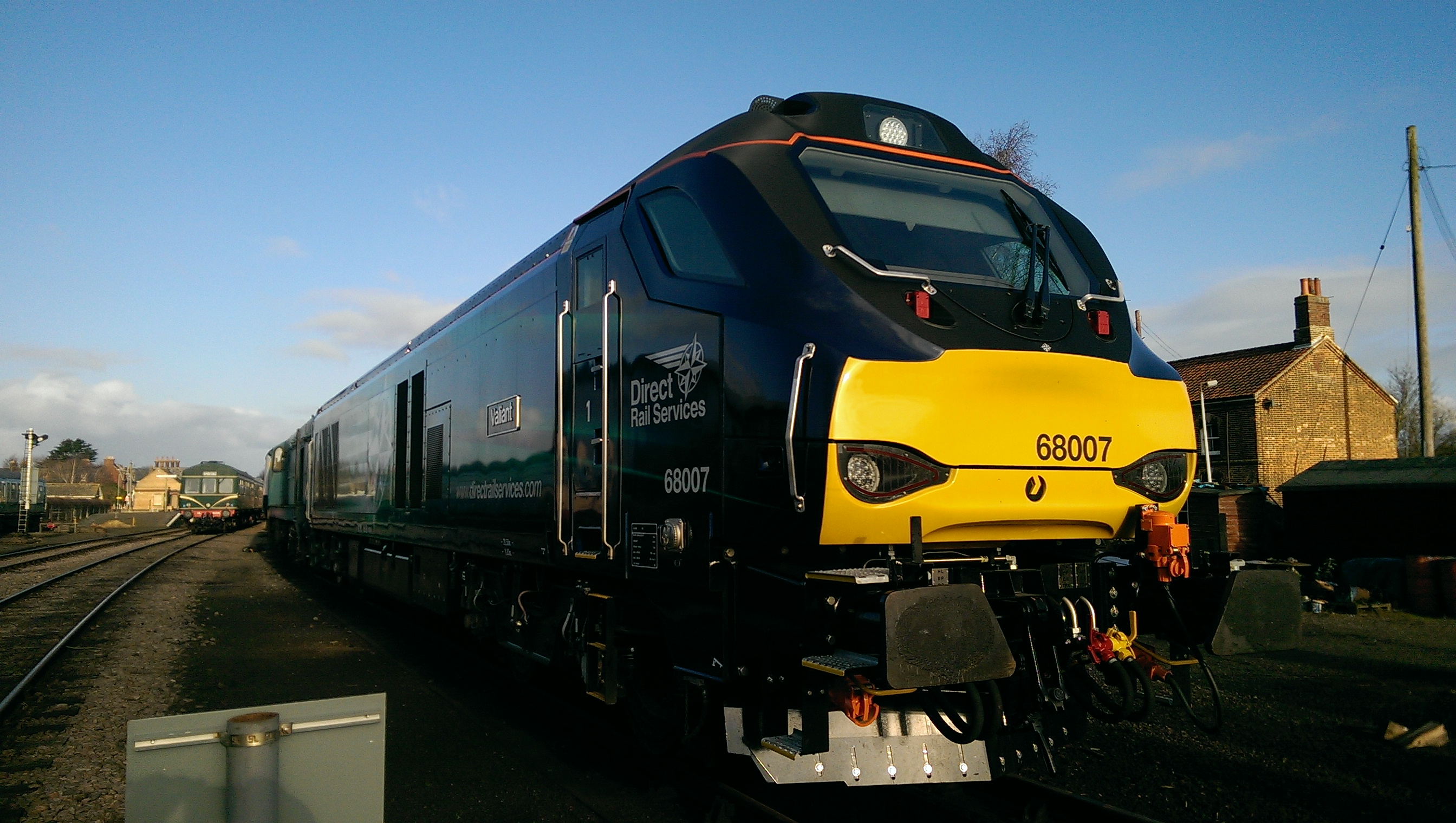
68007 in the yard at Dereham, December 2014

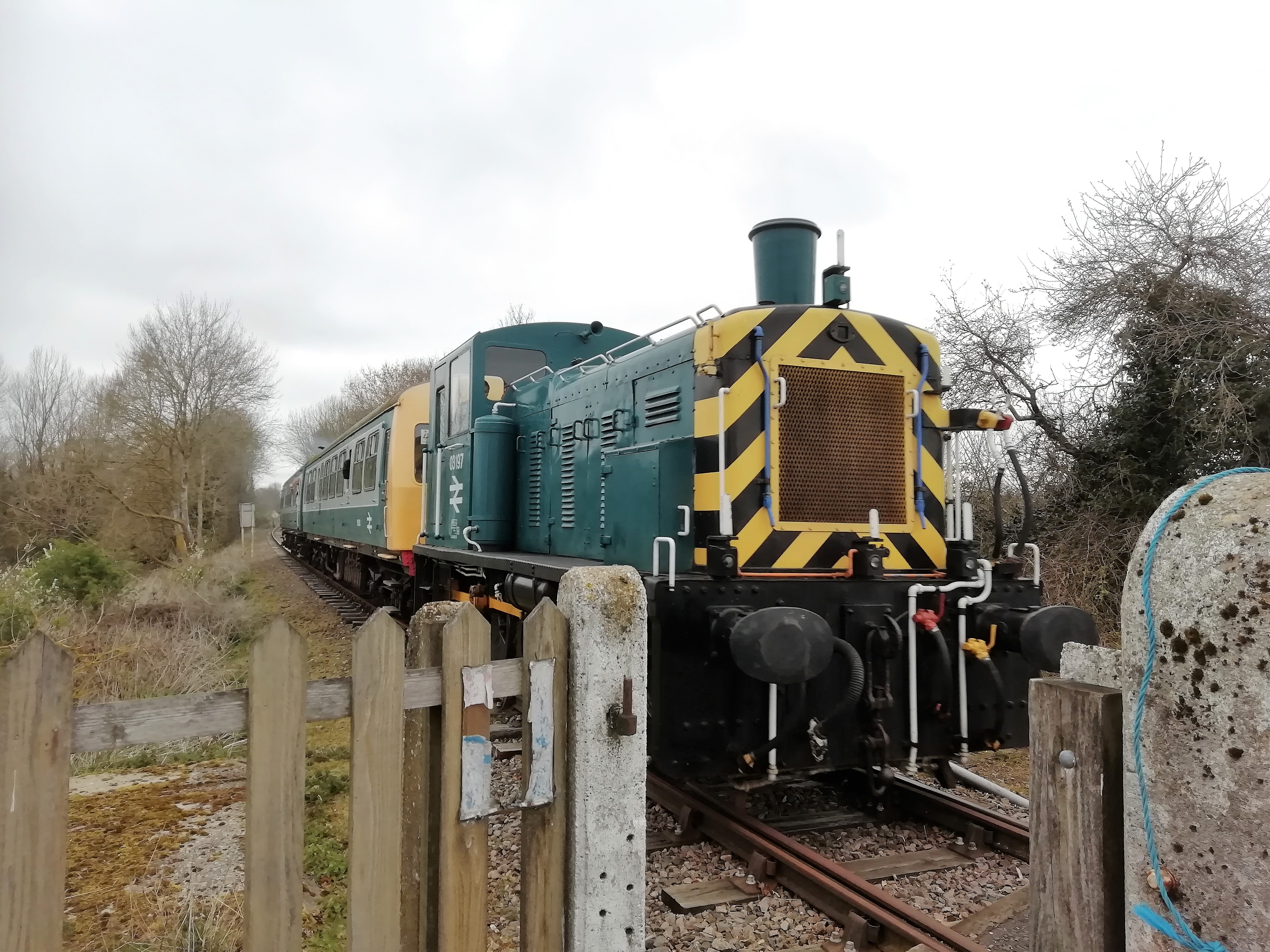
03179 at Hoe level crossing, returning from Worthing, April 2019

Year	Number & Name	Locomotive / Unit Type	Notes
2002	47309 'European Rail Operator of the Year'	British Rail Class 47	Spring Diesel Gala.
2003	47309 'European Rail Operator of the Year'	British Rail Class 47	Spring Diesel Gala.
2003	47200 'The Fosse Way'	British Rail Class 47	Spring Diesel Gala.
2004	47316 'Cam Peak'	British Rail Class 47	Spring Diesel Gala.
2004	47847 'Railway World Magazine'	British Rail Class 47	Spring Diesel Gala.
2005	47714	British Rail Class 47	Spring Diesel Gala.
2006	37259	British Rail Class 37	Autumn Diesel Gala.
2007	33065 'Sealion'	British Rail Class 33	In service on the MNR for a four-week period, including the Spring Diesel Gala.
2007	57011	British Rail Class 57	Autumn Diesel Gala.
2007	37688 'Kingmoor TMD'	British Rail Class 37	Autumn Diesel Gala.
2008	37038	British Rail Class 37	Spring Diesel Gala.
2008	D9521	British Rail Class 14	Operated MNR services May to early July.
2008	E6043	British Rail Class 73	Delivered sister 73210 in September, and worked Autumn Gala.
2008	20315	British Rail Class 20	Autumn Gala.
2008	20307	British Rail Class 20	Autumn Gala.
2009	47580 'County of Essex'	British Rail Class 47	Stratford 47 Gala Day (with 47596).
2009	37425	British Rail Class 37	Spring Diesel Gala.
2009	60059	British Rail Class 60	Spring Diesel Gala.
2009	66144	British Rail Class 66	Spring Diesel Gala.
2009	67008	British Rail Class 67	Spring Diesel Gala.
2009	37510	British Rail Class 37	Autumn Diesel Gala.
2010	26007	British Rail Class 26	Spring Diesel Gala.
2010	45133	British Rail Class 45	Spring Diesel Gala.
2010	D182	British Rail Class 46	Spring Diesel Gala.
2010	47580 'County of Essex'	British Rail Class 47	Spring Diesel Gala.
2010	D6729	British Rail Class 37	Autumn Diesel Gala. Celebrating 50 years of the Class 37 diesel. 37219 would remain on the MNR for the following year.
2010	D6737 'Gartcosh'	British Rail Class 37	Autumn Diesel Gala. Celebrating 50 years of the Class 37 diesel. 37219 would remain on the MNR for the following year.
2010	37109	British Rail Class 37	Autumn Diesel Gala. Celebrating 50 years of the Class 37 diesel. 37219 would remain on the MNR for the following year.
2010	37219 'Shirly Ann Smith'	British Rail Class 37	Autumn Diesel Gala. Celebrating 50 years of the Class 37 diesel. 37219 would remain on the MNR for the following year.
2010	37275	British Rail Class 37	Autumn Diesel Gala. Celebrating 50 years of the Class 37 diesel. 37219 would remain on the MNR for the following year.
2010	37423 'Spirit of The Lakes'	British Rail Class 37	Autumn Diesel Gala. Celebrating 50 years of the Class 37 diesel. 37219 would remain on the MNR for the following year.
2010	37518	British Rail Class 37	Autumn Diesel Gala. Celebrating 50 years of the Class 37 diesel. 37219 would remain on the MNR for the following year.
2010	37601 'Class 37 – Fifty'	British Rail Class 37	Autumn Diesel Gala. Celebrating 50 years of the Class 37 diesel. 37219 would remain on the MNR for the following year.
2010	37706 'Conidae'	British Rail Class 37	Autumn Diesel Gala. Celebrating 50 years of the Class 37 diesel. 37219 would remain on the MNR for the following year.
2010	37906	British Rail Class 37	Autumn Diesel Gala. Celebrating 50 years of the Class 37 diesel. 37219 would remain on the MNR for the following year.
2010	97301	British Rail Class 37	Autumn Diesel Gala. Celebrating 50 years of the Class 37 diesel. 37219 would remain on the MNR for the following year.
2011	73109 'Battle of Britain 50th Anniversary'	British Rail Class 73	Drags and Rescues Event, 14 & 15 May. HST operated one MNR service train on 14 May.
2011	86101 'Sir William A Stanier F R S'	British Rail Class 86	Drags and Rescues Event, 14 & 15 May. HST operated one MNR service train on 14 May.
2011	43075/43082 'Railway Children – The Voice For Street Children Worldwide'	British Rail Class 43 (HST)	
2011	37219 'Shirly Ann Smith'	British Rail Class 37	Autumn "Heavy Haul" diesel gala, 23–25 September.
2011	56302	British Rail Class 56	Autumn "Heavy Haul" diesel gala, 23–25 September.
2011	59001	British Rail Class 59	Autumn "Heavy Haul" diesel gala, 23–25 September.
2011	59101	British Rail Class 59/1	Autumn "Heavy Haul" diesel gala, 23–25 September.
2011	66431	British Rail Class 66	Autumn "Heavy Haul" diesel gala, 23–25 September.
2012	D335	British Rail Class 40	Spring Diesel Gala
2012	55022 'Royal Scots Grey'	British Rail Class 55	Spring Diesel Gala
2012	37682	British Rail Class 37	
2012	37087 'Keighley & Worth Valley Railway'	British Rail Class 37	Stratford Gala
2012	47292	British Rail Class 47	Autumn Diesel Gala, Class 47 Golden Junbilee
2012	47375	British Rail Class 47	Autumn Diesel Gala, Class 47 Golden Junbilee
2012	47401 'North Eastern'	British Rail Class 47	Autumn Diesel Gala, Class 47 Golden Junbilee
2012	47579 'James Nightall G.C.'	British Rail Class 47	Autumn Diesel Gala, Class 47 Golden Junbilee
2012	47580 'County of Essex'	British Rail Class 47	Autumn Diesel Gala, Class 47 Golden Junbilee
2012	47703 'Hermes'	British Rail Class 47	Autumn Diesel Gala, Class 47 Golden Junbilee
2012	47798 'Prince William'	British Rail Class 47	Autumn Diesel Gala, Class 47 Golden Junbilee
2012	47853 'Rail Express'	British Rail Class 47	Autumn Diesel Gala, Class 47 Golden Junbilee
2013	37194	British Rail Class 37	Spring Diesel Gala (replacing original line-up)
2013	66709 'Sorrento'	British Rail Class 66	Spring Diesel Gala (replacing original line-up)
2013	50026 'Indomitable'	British Rail Class 50	Covering for 50019 during main operating season.
2013	55002 'King's Own Yorkshire Light Infantry'	British Rail Class 55	Autumn Diesel Gala
2013	D6700	British Rail Class 37	Autumn Diesel Gala
2013	56097	British Rail Class 56	Autumn Diesel Gala
2013	37706	British Rail Class 37	Autumn Diesel Gala
2014	D1015 'Western Champion'	British Rail Class 52	Delivered stock and then static display at Dereham for Spring Diesel Gala
2014	45133	British Rail Class 45	Spring Diesel Gala (then remaining on MNR for 2014 season)
2014	D306 'Atlantic Conveyor'	British Rail Class 40	Spring Diesel Gala
2014	50007 'Hercules'	British Rail Class 50	Spring Diesel Gala
2014	31108	British Rail Class 31	Spring Diesel Gala
2014	37219 'Demelza'	British Rail Class 37	Spring Diesel Gala
2014	68007	British Rail Class 68	Christmas Diesel Gala. First ever visit of a Class 68 to a diesel gala.
2015	31271 'Stratford 1840 – 2001'	British Rail Class 31	Spring Diesel Gala.
2015	31601	British Rail Class 31	Spring Diesel Gala.
2015	37419	British Rail Class 37	Spring Diesel Gala.
2015	66733	British Rail Class 66	Spring Diesel Gala.
2016	37905	British Rail Class 37	Spring Diesel Gala.
2016	41001	British Rail Class 41 (HST)	Spring Diesel Gala.
2016	50007 'Hercules'	British Rail Class 50	Spring Diesel Gala.
2016	50017 'Royal Oak'	British Rail Class 50	Spring Diesel Gala.
2016	50050 'Fearless'	British Rail Class 50	Spring Diesel Gala.
2016	66426	British Rail Class 66	Spring Diesel Gala.
2017	37688	British Rail Class 37	Spring Diesel Gala.
2017	37424	British Rail Class 37	Spring Diesel Gala.
2017	57007	British Rail Class 57	Spring Diesel Gala.
2017	50026 'Indomitable'	British Rail Class 50	Autumn Diesel Gala. 37688 joining the home fleet.
2017	37688	British Rail Class 37	Autumn Diesel Gala. 37688 joining the home fleet.
2018	26043	British Rail Class 26	Spring Diesel Gala.
2018	33035	British Rail Class 33	Spring Diesel Gala.
2018	45060 'Sherwood Forester'	British Rail Class 45	Spring Diesel Gala.
2018	88008 'Ariadne'	British Rail Class 88	Spring Diesel Gala.
2018	03197	British Rail Class 03	Abellio Greater Anglia storage works trains (continued into 2019)
2018	33202 'Dennis G. Robinson'	British Rail Class 33	Abellio Greater Anglia storage works trains (continued into 2019)
2018	41001	British Rail Class 41	Polar Express™ (continued into 2019)
2019	03197	British Rail Class 03	Spring Diesel Gala.
2019	33202 'Dennis G. Robinson'	British Rail Class 33	Spring Diesel Gala.
2019	37423 'Sir Murray Morrison 1873–1948 Pioneer of British Aluminium Industry'	British Rail Class 37	Spring Diesel Gala.
2019	41001	British Rail Class 41 HST	Spring Diesel Gala.
2019	50008 'Thunderer'	British Rail Class 50	Spring Diesel Gala.
2020	03197	British Rail Class 03	Dereham depot duties
2022	D8001	British Rail Class 20	Autumn Diesel Gala
2022	57312	British Rail Class 57	Autumn Diesel Gala
2024	37608 'Andromeda'	British Rail Class 37	Spring Diesel Gala
2025	43153	British Rail Class 43	MNR 30th Anniversary Weekend
2025	43194	British Rail Class 43	MNR 30th Anniversary Weekend
2025	20007	British Rail Class 20	Spring Diesel Gala
2025	20205	British Rail Class 20	Spring Diesel Gala
2025	37501 'Teesside Steelmaster'	British Rail Class 37	Spring Diesel Gala
2025	37800 'Cassiopeia'	British Rail Class 37	Spring Diesel Gala
2025	43094	British Rail Class 43	Romic Group Launch Day (7th October)
2025	43122	British Rail Class 43	Romic Group Launch Day (7th October)
