= TSOB =

TSOB may refer to:

- The Sexuality of Bereavement, an EP by death/doom metal band My Dying Bride.
- The Spoils of Babylon, a TV series
- Tourist Standard Open Buffet, a type of British railway carriage
