= British Rail coach type codes =

Series of letter-codes for train coaches

British Railways coach designations were a series of letter-codes used to identify different types of coaches, both passenger carrying and non-passenger carrying stock (NPCS). The code was generally painted on the end of the coach but non-gangwayed stock had the code painted on the side. They have been superseded by TOPS design codes.

== Background ==
The London, Midland and Scottish Railway and the London and North Eastern Railway developed systems of identifying railway carriages with alphabetic codes. When British Railways was formed in 1948, it adapted the LNER system.

== Basic principles ==
The codes are made up from a combination of letters, some of which can indicate more than one word; their meaning can only be determined according to their position in the code or the presence of other letters. The letters are:

| Code | Meaning |
|---|---|
| B | Brake van (prefix) |
| B | Buffet (suffix) |
| B | Battery (prefix for multiple unit vehicles) |
| C | Composite (more than one class of accommodation) |
| D | Driving vehicle (prefix) |
| D | Disabled accommodation (suffix) |
| E | Either class of accommodation |
| E | End vehicle (suffix) |
| F | First Class |
| G | Gangwayed (e.g. BG - Brake Gangwayed) |
| H | Handbrake |
| HM | Half-motor (prefix on multiple units); Used for vehicles with one traction motor or engine where the Motor type vehicle of that class usually had two |
| K | corridor |
| L | Lavatory (usually shown only in non-gangwayed or diesel multiple unit codes) |
| L | Lounge (prefix) (but see SL) |
| M | Motor (powered) vehicle |
| O | Open (i.e. no compartments, or no kitchen in Restaurant cars); O not used for diesel multiple units as most are Open |
| o | Semi-open (i.e. mix of compartments and open); Some books have used so in place of o, to avoid confusion with O |
| P | Pantograph (prefix for electric multiple units) |
| P | Pantry (suffix) |
| P | Pullman (prefix) |
| P | Parlour (suffix for Pullman cars) |
| R | Restaurant |
| RG | Restaurant Griddle |
| RK | Restaurant Kitchen |
| RM | Miniature/Modular Restaurant |
| S | Second Class (Standard Class from May 1985) |
| SL | Sleeper |
| T | Third Class |
| T | Trailer (prefix for multiple unit vehicles) |
| T | Trolley buffet (suffix) |
| T | Tourist (prefix for hauled carriages, indicates 2+2 seating) |
| U | Unclassified accommodation |
| W | Wheelchair Area |
| Y | Four-wheeled vehicle (Note: If no such suffix, the vehicle is an eight or twelve-wheeled vehicle. The latter were not common, and were usually special saloons or restaurants.) |
| Z | Six-wheeled vehicle |

These letters (except Y and Z) did not usually apply to passenger-rated but goods carrying vans (e.g. parcels vans, horse boxes, milk and fish vans). Their codes were an acronym of their traditional railway description, e.g. GUV for General Utility Vans.

== List of codes used ==
The following list lists those codes that were used on BR cross-referred to the comparable code used by the LMS, with the exception that the letter S ("Second", later "Standard") is used where until 1956 the letter T ("Third") was used. Suffix codes Y or Z are not shown, as these could apply to variants of any or all vehicle types.

In the LNER system, S stood for "Second", a class between First and Third (which became Second on 3 June 1956). The original Second was more or less abolished in the 1870s as a result of the Railway Regulation Act 1844, remaining only in limited use for special services, such as those meeting ships (which retained the three-class system from which railway classifications had originated). In May 1988 BR reclassified Second to Standard but this did not alter the code.

Multiple unit coaches originally distinguished between open and corridor types by adding the letter O or K at the end (for example, TSO or TSK), and also distinguished coaches with lavatories by adding the letter L at the end (for example DMBSOL) but these fell out of use when corridor stock became less common which enabled the codes to be restricted to no more than four letters.

| BR Code | Description | LMS Code |
|---|---|---|
| B | Brake (non-gangwayed) | |
| BC | Brake Composite | |
| BCK | Brake Composite Corridor | CBB |
| BCL | Brake Composite Lavatory | |
| BCV | BRUTE Carrying Van | |
| BDBS | Battery Driving Trailer Brake Second | |
| BDMS | Battery Driving Motor Second | |
| BDTC | Battery Driving Trailer Composite | |
| BDTC | Battery Driving Trailer Composite | |
| BDTS | Battery Driving Trailer Second | |
| BFB | Bullion Container Flat | |
| BFK | Brake First Corridor | E |
| BFO | Brake First Open | |
| BG | Gangwayed Full Brake | CBR |
| BGP | Brake gangwayed pigeon van | |
| BGZ | Brake gangwayed (six-wheels) | CR |
| BPOT | Brake Post Office tender | |
| BS | Brake Second | H |
| BSK | Brake Second Corridor | CH |
| BSL | Brake Second Lavatory | LH |
| BSO | Brake Second Open | VH |
| BSO(T) | Brake Second Open Trolley(Micro Buffet) | |
| BTK | Brake Third Corridor | |
| BUO | Brake Unclassified Open | |
| BY | Brake (non-gangwayed, four-wheeled) | |
| BZ | Brake (non-gangwayed, six-wheeled) | R |
| C | Composite | BC |
| CCT | Covered Carriage Truck | |
| CK | Corridor Composite | CBC |
| CL | Lavatory Composite | LC |
| CO | Composite Open | VC |
| CTO | Open Carriage Truck | |
| DBSO | Driving Brake Second Open | |
| DM | Driving Motor | |
| DMB | Driving Motor Brake | |
| DMBC | Driving Motor Brake Composite | |
| DMBF | Driving Motor Brake First | |
| DMBS | Driving Motor Brake Second | |
| DMBSO | Driving Motor Brake Second Open | |
| DMC | Driving Motor Composite | |
| DMLV | Driving Motor Luggage Van | |
| DMS | Driving Motor Second | |
| DTBS | Driving Trailer Brake Second | |
| DTC | Driving Trailer Composite | |
| DTS | Driving Trailer Second | |
| DTV | Driving Trailer Van | |
| DVT | Driving van trailer | |
| FK | Corridor First | CL |
| FO | Open First | QL |
| FOT | First Open Trolley | |
| GUV | General utility van | |
| HB | Horse box | |
| IFV | Insulated fish van | |
| KB | Kitchen Buffet(no seats, later RKB) | |
| LFK | Lounge First | |
| M | Motor | |
| MBS | Motor Brake Second | |
| MFLRK | Motor First Lavatory Kitchen | |
| MLV | Motor Luggage Van | |
| MPSL | Motor Parlour Second Lavatory | |
| MS | Motor Second | |
| MSLRK | Motor Second Lavatory Kitchen | |
| NPV | Newspaper Van | |
| PCP | Pullman Composite Parlour | |
| PCV | Propelling control vehicle or Parcels Van | |
| PFB | Pullman First Brake | |
| PFK | Pullman First Kitchen | |
| PFP | Pullman First Parlour | |
| PMV | Parcels & Miscellaneous Van (NPCS) or Pantograph Motor Van (EMU coach) | |
| POS | Post Office sorting van | POR |
| POT | Post Office stowage van | PPR |
| PSB | Pullman Second Brake | |
| PSP | Pullman Second Parlour | |
| PTSO | Pantograph Trailer Second Open | |
| PVG | Packing Van Gangway (newspaper) | |
| RB | Restaurant Buffet | |
| BRK | Restaurant Buffet (larger kitchen) | |
| RBR | Restaurant Buffet Refurbished | |
| RBS | Restaurant Unclassed (proper buffet) | |
| RC | Restaurant Composite | Compo RKC |
| RCO | Restaurant Composite Open | VC Dining |
| RE | Griddle | |
| RF | Restaurant First | First RKC |
| RFB | Restaurant First Buffet | |
| RFM | Restaurant First Modular | |
| RFO | Restaurant First Open | QL Dining |
| RK | Kitchen Car | KC |
| RKB | Kitchen Buffet (no seats) | BRC |
| RLB | Restaurant Lounge First Buffet | |
| RMB | Restaurant Miniature Buffet | |
| RMBT | Micro Buffet | |
| RS | Restaurant Second | Third RKC |
| RSO | Restaurant Second Open (without kitchen) | QF Dining |
| RU | Unclassified Restaurant< | Common RKC |
| RUB | Restaurant Unclassified (makeshift buffet) | |
| RUK | Restaurant Unclassified Kitchen | |
| RUO | Restaurant Unclassified Open (with kitchen) | |
| S | Second | F |
| SCV | Special Cattle Van | |
| SD | Saloon Discothèque | |
| SK | Corridor Second | CF |
| SLB | Bullion Van | |
| SLC | Sleeper Composite | CSC |
| SLCP | Sleeper Composite with Pantry | |
| SLE | Sleeper Either Class | |
| SLEP | Sleeper Either Class with Pantry | |
| SLF | Sleeper First | SC |
| SLO | Open Second with Lavatory (Non-gangwayed) | |
| SLSC | Sleeper Support Coach | |
| SLSTP | Sleeper Second Twin-Berth with Pantry | SCT |
| SLO | Second Lavatory Open (within carriage) | |
| SO | Open Second | QF |
| SO(NG) | Second Open (non-gangwayed) | |
| SPV | Special Parcels Van | |
| TAV | Trailer Auxiliary Van | |
| TBC | Trailer Brake Composite | |
| TBF | Trailer Brake First | |
| TBS | Trailer Brake Second | |
| TC | Trailer Composite | |
| TCC | Trailer Composite Conductor | |
| TCV | Tiered Car Carrier | |
| TF | Trailer First | |
| TFLRK | Trailer First Lavatory Kitchen | |
| TG | Trailer Griddle | |
| TGS | Trailer Guard Second | |
| TOV | Third Open Vestibuled (Later reclassified TSO) | |
| TPFL | Trailer Parlour First Lavatory | |
| TRB | Trailer Restaurant Buffet Unclassified | |
| TRFB | Trailer Restaurant First Buffet | |
| TRFM | Trailer Restaurant First Modular | |
| TRSB | Trailer Restaurant Second Buffet | |
| TRUB | Trailer Restaurant Unclassified Buffet | |
| TRUK | Trailer Restaurant Unclassified Kitchen | |
| TS | Trailer Second | |
| TSCD | Trailer Second Conductor Disabled | |
| TSO | Tourist Second Open | |
| TSOD | Tourist Standard Open Disabled | |
| TSOE | Tourist Standard Open End Coach | |
| TSO(T) | Tourist Second Open Trolley (Micro Buffet) | |
| TU | Trailer unclassified | |
| VFV | Ventilated fruit van | |

== See also ==
British carriage and wagon numbering and classification
