= Tourist Standard Open Buffet =

Tourist Standard Open Buffet or TSOB cars are railway passenger carriages used in the United Kingdom originally by British Rail and by its successor railways following privatisation.

TSOBs numbered 10401-10406 are in use with the privatised British railway company Abellio Greater Anglia. These vehicles have been designed to accommodate additional passengers beyond those able to be accommodated by the Standard Open-class carriages upon which they are based. There are about 62 seats in this coach and there are 8 priority seating spaces for the elderly and/or disabled.
