= British railway brake van =

Type of railway vehicle

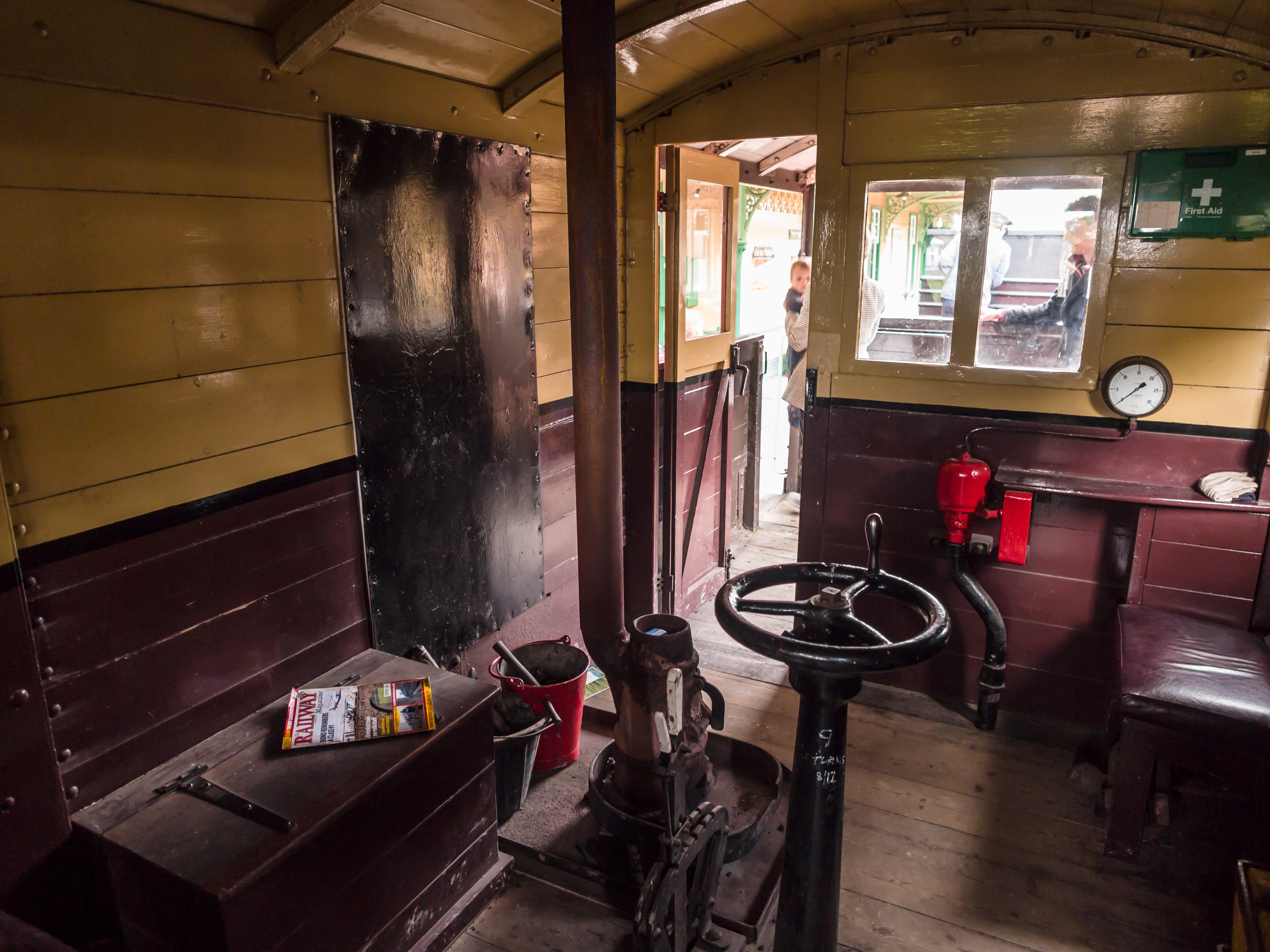
Interior of a typical goods brake van. Immediately to the left of the doorway is the stove and stove pipe; to the left of this are a firebucket, ducket (blanked off) and sandbox; in front of the stove is the sanding lever; to the right are the handbrake, vacuum brake handle, vacuum gauge and seat

British Railways inherited a variety of brake vans from each of the Big Four: GWR, LNER, Southern Railway and LMS due to the nationalisation of the railways in 1948.

A brake van, on a train, is a wagon at the rear of a goods train where a guard would sit with a hand brake. All brake vans served the same purpose: to supplement brake-force to a train. They were also needed as an emergency hand brake, should an unfitted train become uncoupled from the locomotive and become a runaway train. Brake vans are operated by the Guard, a member of staff on the train, who is in charge of making sure that the lights are in the correct place. This is because a signalman would need to see the tail-lamp to know that the train had not split, so that he can clear the line.

Most vans had both normal brakes and vacuum brakes. They also contained a fire for the comfort of the Guard.

Many brake vans today are used on heritage railways as passenger vehicles, like on the Helston Railway and the National Railway Museum demonstration lines at York and Shildon.

== History ==
From the earliest days of railways in the Britain until 1890s, trains were rarely fitted with a continuous brake system for the entire train. Slowing and stopping trains relied on a brake on the locomotive, and brake vans and carriages, which had hand brakes that would slow and stop trains. This, combined with the coupling design of the era, buffer and chain coupling, which was prone to unexpected failure, resulted in many incidents of wagons and carriages rolling away uncontrolled. The Armagh rail disaster in 1889, where the rear portion of a passenger train ran away down a grade, colliding with a following train, killing 80, resulted in the Regulation of Railways Act 1889. This act, addressing key issues in the disaster, introduced minimum requirements for the brake systems on passenger trains.

To provide for and use on all their trains carrying passengers continuous brakes complying with the following requirements, namely:

(i)The brake must be instantaneous in action, and capable of being applied by the engine-driver and guards;
(ii)The brake must be self-applying in the event of any failure in the continuity of its action; (Note: The brakes will apply automatically, should a fault occur, such as the brake hose between carriages separate.)
(iii)The brake must be capable of being applied to every vehicle of the train, whether carrying passengers or not;
(iv)The brake must be in regular use in daily working;

(v)The materials of the brake must be of a durable character, and easily maintained and kept in order.

— Regulation of Railways Act 1889,

However, the Regulation of Railways Act 1889 was only specific to passenger trains, and any carriages and wagons that may form a passenger train. Freight trains, were still not required to have a continuous brake system, thus brake vans still remained a fixture on freight trains, and runaways still occurred. These trains, without continuous brakes, were referred to as "unfitted", reflecting the fact they were not fitted with a continuous brake. By the mid-twentieth century, this would start to change as freight wagons with brakes began to appear on the railway, however the phase out of wagons not equipped continuous brakes took decades. As result, "partly fitted" trains, where only some of the wagons had continuous brakes, while others in the train did not, would be prevalent into the 1970s. However changes in freight traffic, freight wagon design and the demands of overall railway environment would see the near elimination of unfitted and partly fitted freight trains by the 1980s.

=== Pre-British Rail ===
Each railway produced its own designs of brake vans, and there was a considerable variety. Even individual companies usually used multiple designs. Generally, brake vans were kept within the owning railway, and when a goods train passed from one railway to another with the locomotive being changed at the exchange point, the brake van would be changed as well. From 1942, wartime conditions ended this practice, and brake vans were pooled; consequently, the Railway Clearing House designed a British Standard Brake Van, to be used by all the railways. Four were built by the LMS in 1943, which kept the first one for themselves and supplied one to each of the other three companies. The GWR, LMS and SR did not adopt this, and continued with their own designs.

=== Early British Rail ===
British Railways, being an amalgamation of four companies, that were in turn an amalgamation of 120 railways, merged only 24 years earlier, resulted in a wide variety of designs for brake vans. British Railways in the years immediately after its formation continued to use the various wagon designs plans it had inherited, gradually adjusting designs, such as using steel in place of wood. In February 1948, the Railway Executive appointed the Ideal Stocks Committee to make recommendations on "ideal" wagon and locomotive designs for traffic of the 1950s. The committee also reviewed the matter of brakes on freight wagons. From an economic stand point, the committee identified that it would cost £31 million (equivalent to £54.82 million in 2025), and that the results of moving forward would land somewhere between an annual loss of £1.2 million (equivalent to £2.12 million in 2025) to an annual gain of £1.3 million (equivalent to £2.3 million in 2025) The committee ultimately recommended further investigation into if fitting of continuous brakes to all freight wagons should move forward. In time, British Railways settled on a set design for new brake vans going forward, a 20 ton design, based on LNER's brake van design, with a few minor adjustments, to the length of the stepboards on the sides for boarding the brake van, and where hand rails were provided.

Taking advantage of the fact that brake vans were intended to and usually required at the rear of trains, including those used for 'permanent way' track work, a special brake van was designed that carried a plough on each end, to assist in spreading track ballast as it was unloaded by ballast hoppers. The plough could be lowered using a wheel on the platform on either end. The vans, referred to as 'shark' brake vans, were based on the predecessor LMS' design, using the LMS brake van design. The Caledonian Railway had a design of ballast brake van very similar to that of the LMS type, six were built from 1902 to 1906.

British Railways would go on to copy the LNER 'Toad D' brake van design, which would become known as the 'British Rail Standard Brake Van'.

The 1963 The Reshaping of British Railways report would mark a shift in British Rail away from unfitted, wagonload, freight trains, and a desire to shift towards 'Liner Trains' (unit trains of shipping containers, and unit trains for freight, such as coal. This shift was motivated by the costs involved with the handling of wagonload trains, and the lack of profit in this sector of freight. There was a clear desire to move towards newer, brake equipped wagons, which would enable higher speeds, higher freight capacity, more wagons per train and would make more effective use of increasingly powerful locomotives. A noted aspect of the proposed Liner Trains, were the new wagon would be intended for high speed operations, and outfitted with air or vacuum brakes.

By the mid-1960s, wagonload freight was still unprofitable, incentivizing British Rail to curtail the service and in turn withdraw older, unfitted rolling stock.

In 1968, the requirement for fully fitted freight trains to end with a guard's van was removed from the rule book, and the guard was allowed to ride in the rearmost locomotive cab, which provided a good view of the whole train. By this time, the Beeching Axe had reduced by two-thirds the amount of trackage in the UK; as a result, most steam locomotives had been withdrawn and most British Railways standard-design diesel and electric locomotives had double-ended cabs. Therefore, there was no operational need for so many brake vans, and many types were withdrawn.

=== Later British Rail ===
In 1985, rail unions agreed to single-man operation of some freight trains, the first time trains did not have a guard on board for over 150 years. Further, the conclusion of almost all unfitted freight trains in the late 1980s, saw brake vans continue to become unneeded. At this point, brake vans were only required on select trains, often when demanded by railway regulations, typically dangerous goods, unusual cargos, and engineering trains

The British Railways Working Manual for Rail Staff - Section 3 - Handling and Carriage of Dangerous Goods, known as 'Pink Pages', for the pink paper it was printed on, into the 1990s, required that trains carrying Class 2(c) Toxic gases, Hydrocyanic acid, nuclear flasks, along with any dangerous goods requiring an escort, must have a guard and brake van. Wagon labels for these specific cargos, used by British Rail to supplement standard dangerous goods placards and provide special instructions to train crews, contained the phrase "BRAKE VAN REQUIRED".

The brake van was required to be either fitted with a brake matching the rest of the train, or have a brake pipe and brake gauge and emergency brake valve. The intended purpose of the brake van at the rear of the train was to enable the required protection of a train to be carried out, without staff walking past dangerous goods wagons. The Pink Pages procedures for train crews following an accident involving toxic gases and Hydrocyanic acid contained clear warnings that "Driver and guard must never go towards each other past affected wagons."

Dangerous goods trains requiring an escort had additional regulations, requiring that the escorts travel in the brake van, and that no more than 3 escorts could ride in the brake van with the guard, otherwise a second brake van for the escorts was required.

=== Post privatisation ===
In 2021, Preparation and working of freight trains - Issue 1, came into effect. This module of the railway rule book is the modern successor of the former Working Manual for Rail Staff documents Freight Train Operations or the 'White Pages' and Handling and Carriage of Dangerous Goods or the 'Pink Pages', now merged as a single document. This revision removes all references to brake vans in the dangerous goods sections, with the related sections now instructing guards to either ride in the rearmost driving cab of a locomotive or an escort vehicle if one is provided. Brake vans are still mentioned in two sections directed at train preparers, regarding their inclusion in measuring the total length and weight of trains.

In the years immediately prior to that, brake vans were only deemed necessary by HM Railway Inspectorate or Network Rail in certain special cases, for example in trains with unusual cargoes or track maintenance trains, or when one of the few single-cabbed locomotives was used, such as the British Rail Class 20.

=== Preservation and heritage railways ===
Brake vans are a common sight on many heritage railways such as the Helston Railway, the National Railway Museum or other small railways. On occasion, multiple brake vans will be coupled together in what is known as a "brake van special" for people to ride in on larger railways.

== Design ==
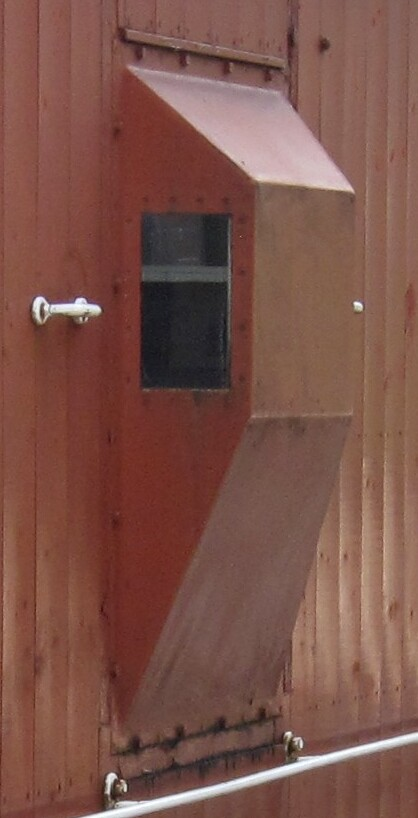
A brake van 'ducket'.

Early brake vans were heavily weighted, adapted open freight wagons, equipped with an externally mounted hand-operated brake acting on all four wheels. The term 'brake van' began to be adopted from the 1870s onwards, when bespoke designed vehicles had a specific hut added to house the guard away from inclement weather. In keeping with tradition, most brake vans had an open area, but from the 1870s onwards this "veranda" became in part enclosed through the addition of a roof. Some vans became fully enclosed, but were equipped at each end with windows to allow the guard to view the entire train.

All of the operating equipment, specifically the brakes and sand boxes to improve traction, were located in the open area of the brake van. Brakes were normally controlled using a hand wheel mounted within the veranda, although some early designs continued with an externally mounted shaft. To improve the guard's visibility, many were fitted with look-outs on the roof, but side look-outs (termed "duckets") were the more common. The North Eastern Railway, Great Central Railway, London, Brighton and South Coast Railway and the Lancashire and Yorkshire Railway all built brake vans with a raised look-out at one end of the roof.

Two factors increase amount of friction between the brake van and the track; the number of wheels and the weight. In order to increase the weight brake vans often had a significant amount of ballast, in the form of concrete, cast iron or water tanks. Although most brake vans had two axles with four wheels, many railway brake vans had three axles and six wheels. The Great Northern Railway built a few eight-wheelers for very heavy coal trains which were the only rigid eight-wheeler brake vans built in the UK. In the 1930s, the London Midland and Scottish Railway (LMS) built three bespoke twin-bogied vans (four axles, eight wheels), for use on a particular branch line, where they replaced pairs of four-wheeled vans. The design covered the entire chassis length, with two extended verandas on either side of a cabin equipped with twin duckets.

To improve braking further, some LMS and LNER brake vans were fitted with vacuum brakes in addition to their normal brake, which could be operated by the guard. Almost all War Department brake vans were fitted with vacuum cylinders, as they were exclusively used on ammunition trains. The Southern Railway built 21 twin-bogie brake vans on redundant electric locomotive chassis, followed by 25 built on new chassis having carriage bogies, which were termed the "Queen Mary" brake vans. Designed for high speed operation on fully fitted goods trains rather than stopping power, they had a lengthened cabin, but did not cover the entire twin-bogie chassis.

Other features of the van's interior would be a coal stove for the guard's heating and cooking needs, above which was a rail with hook on for the purpose of drying wet clothing. Furniture would consist of padded seating, with pads at shoulder height to protect the guard from the inevitable jolts and jerks ('snatches') of freight work, at the duckets; the guard would sit here for protection while the train was moving, unless absolutely necessary. He could reach the brake wheel from that position. This padded seat would be on top of a bench locker that stretched the entire side of one side of the van and half of the other (the side which the stove). A further padded seat was provided at the end of this bench locker where there was a small desk for the guard to perform whatever written work was necessary.

=== Equipment Carried ===
British Railways Rule 129 required the guard riding on any train to confirm his brake van carried the following equipment:

- A set of red and green signalling flags,
- At least 12 detonators (fog signals),
- At least 2 "sprags":A section of wood designed to be shoved into gaps in the side of a railway wagon wheel, that physically prevent the wheel from rotating, effectively immobilizing a wagon. They were often used during shunting operations, or when wagons needed detached from a train as means to prevent runaways.
- A shunting pole: a wooden pole about 6 feet long with a twisted hook on the end which was used to couple and uncouple 3-link and instanter couplings without the guard having to position himself dangerously in between the vehicles,
- Various lamps: A guard would ensure they were carried, filled, trimmed, and ready for use where required by railway rules.
  - Hand lamp: A lamp kept inside the brake van that was required to be lit: at night, during fog or falling snow, long tunnels, or any other location ordered by the Operating Superintendent,
  - Tail lamp: A lamp mounted on the center of the brake van, that displayed a red light to anyone viewing the train from behind, such as a following train that there was a train, as enabling signallers to confirm the train was complete.
- Track circuit operating clips: A pair of metal spring clips connected by a wire used on lines with track circuits to indicate to the signalman that a train is occupying that section. They would be used in the event of an accident in which other running lines were fouled and trains on them had to be stopped as a matter of great urgency. The requirement to carry these arrived later on, as track circuits became more common. By 1986, a set of two track circuit operating clips was required to be carried in brake vans.

Other equipment commonly found in the brake van, but not specifically required by Rule 129 included:

- A brake stick: similar in shape to a square ended baseball bat; and used to lever down the handbrakes of wagons by placing it under the solebar and applying downward pressure,

== Gallery ==
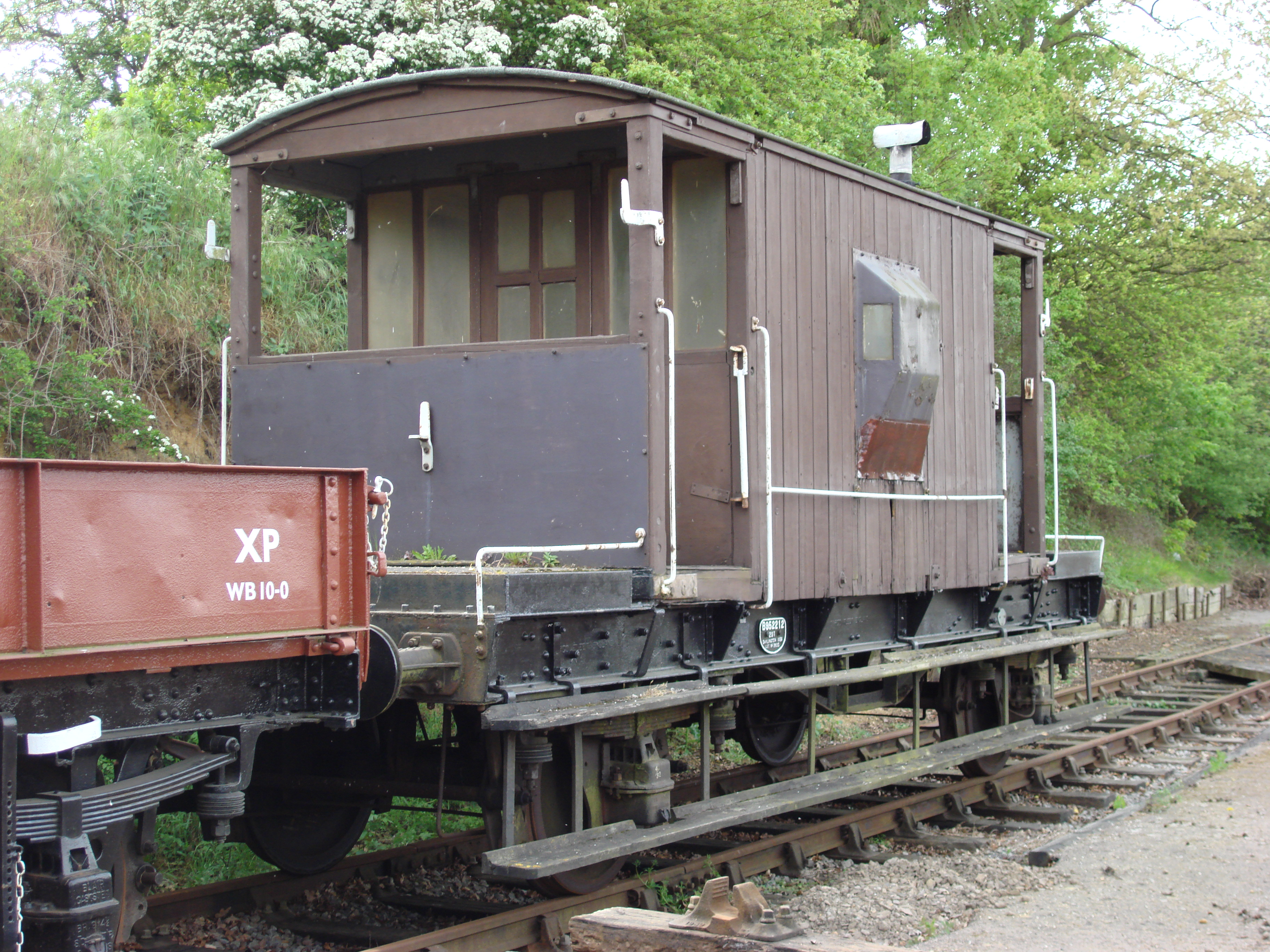
British Railways Standard Brake Van

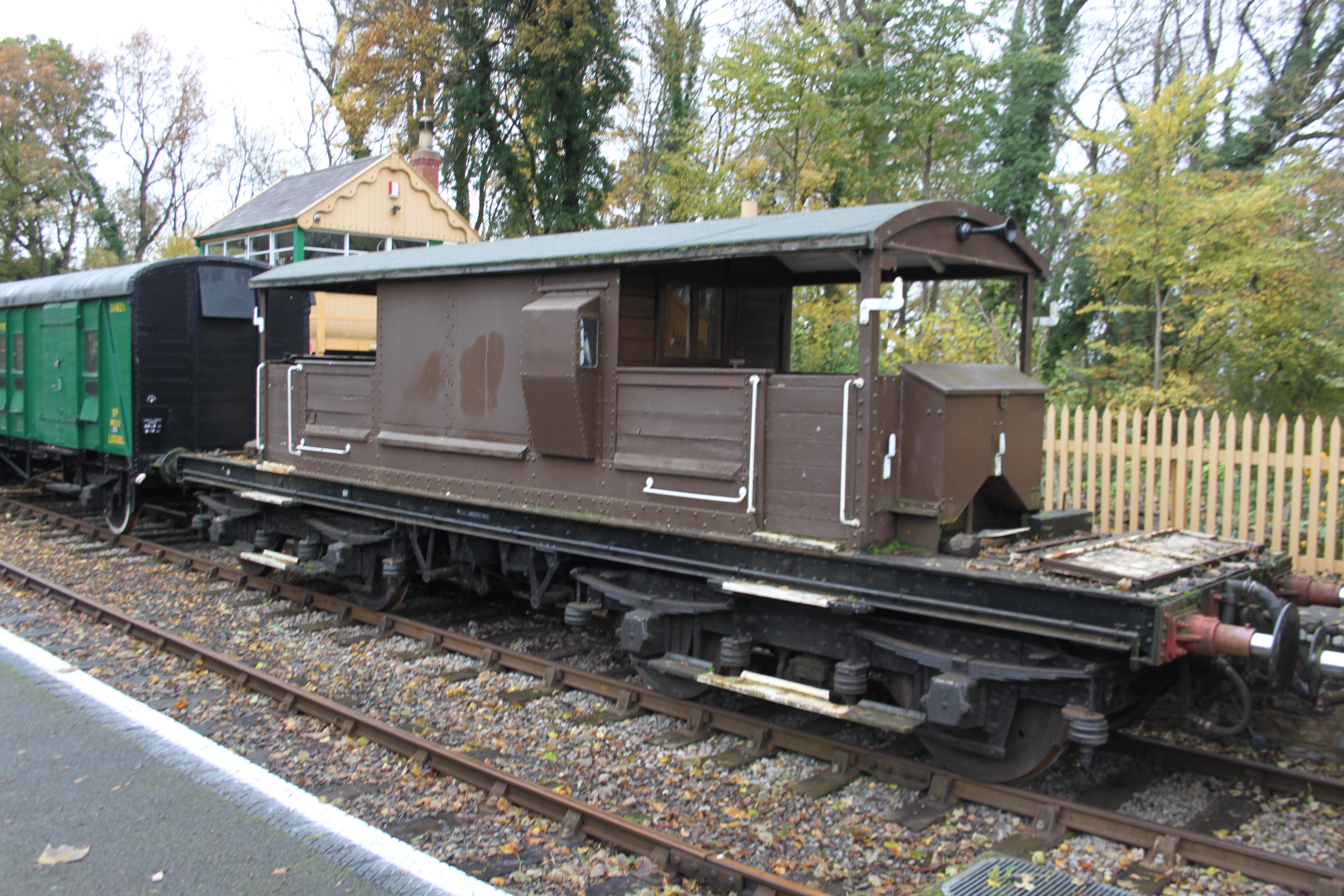
Southern Railway Queen Mary

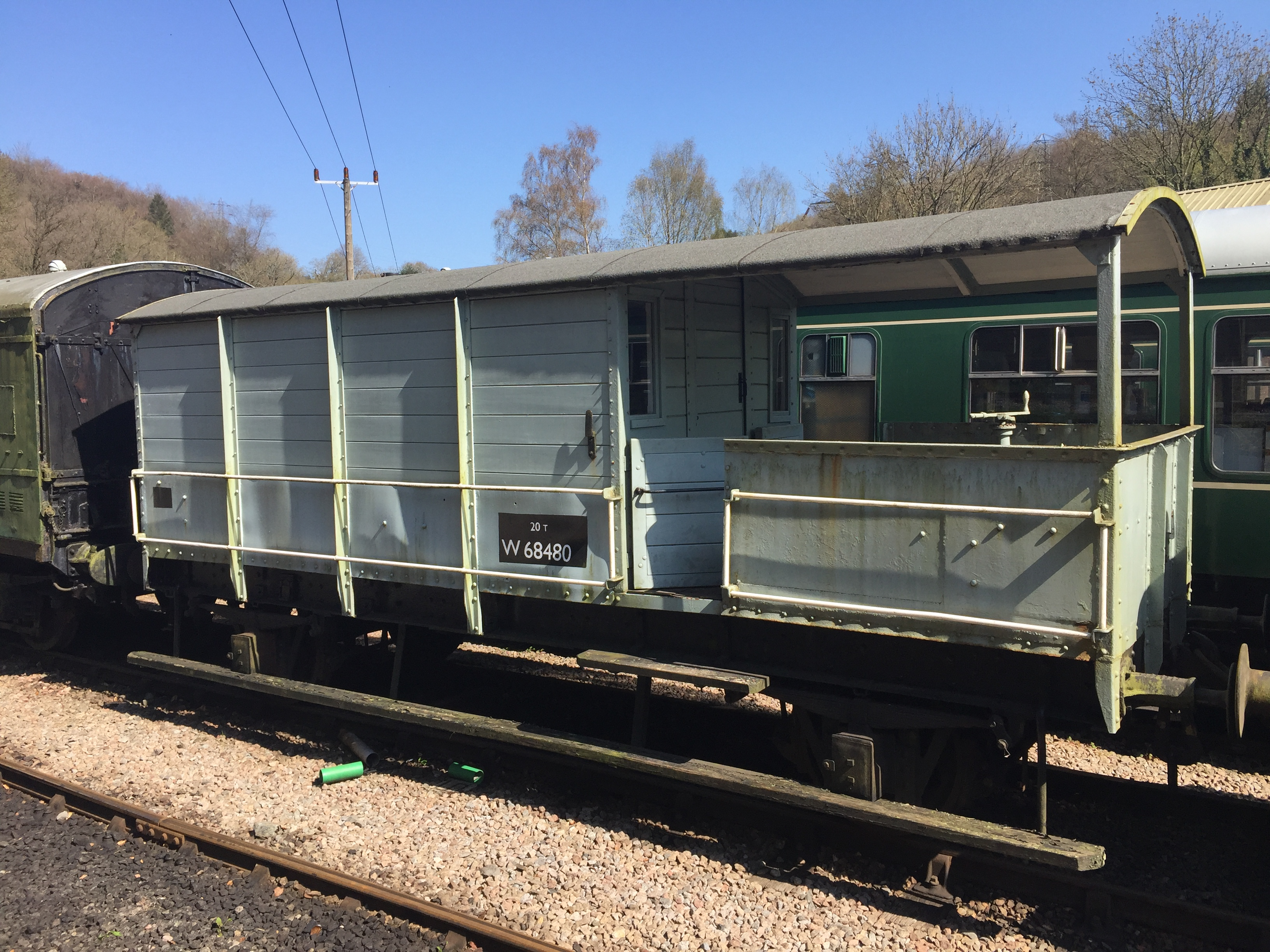
Great Western Railway Toad brake van

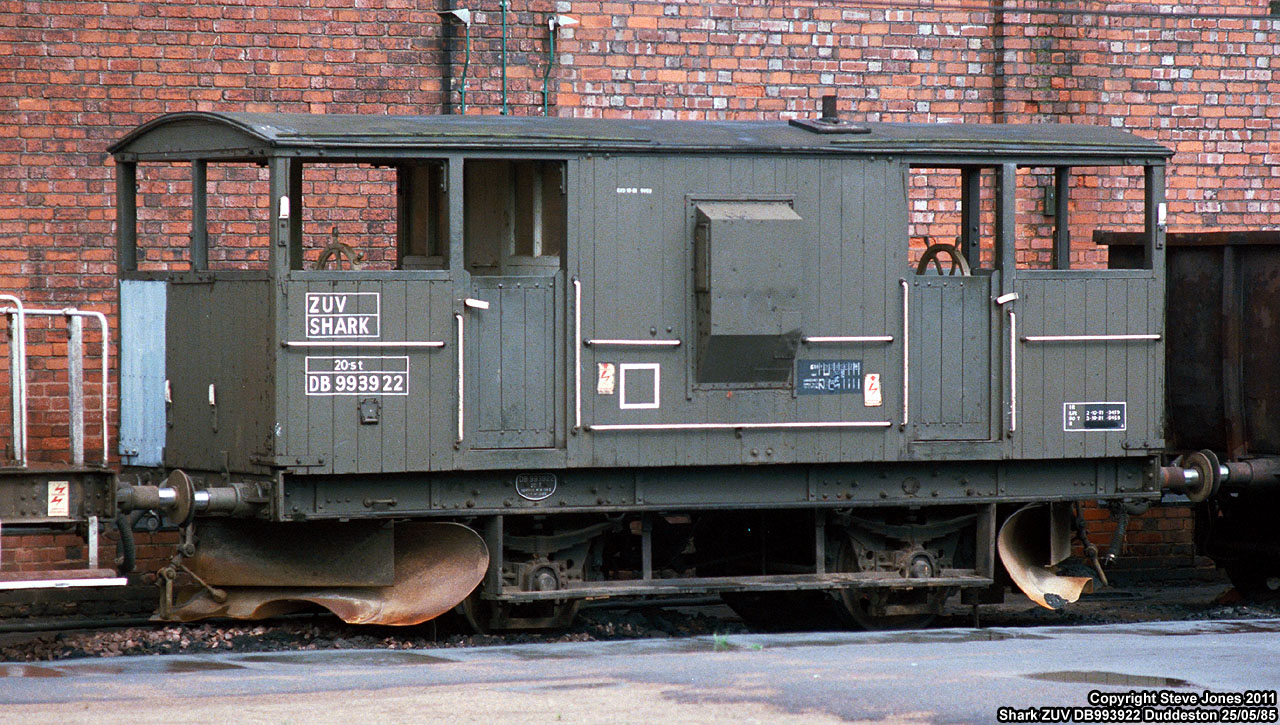
'Shark' ballast plough brake van

== TOPS codes ==
Following the introduction of TOPS, a system used to track the movement of rolling stock across the British Rail network, all brake vans were allocated a TOPS code. Brake van codes always started with "CA" designating the vehicle as a 'brake van', with the final letter specifying what brakes the brake van was equipped with.

TOPS codes for brake vans in running stock
TOPS Code	CARKND Name	Brake type (Note: All brake van designs have a hand brake.)
CAO	Traffic brake van (Unfitted)	Hand brake only
CAP	Traffic brake van (Vacuum pipe)	vacuum brake through pipe (Note: A 'through piped' railway vehicle has a brake pipe, so continuous vacuum/air brakes on following vehicles will work after the vehicle in question, but the 'through piped' vehicle does not have any brakes operated by that particular braking system.)
CAQ	Traffic brake van (Air pipe)	Air brake through pipe
CAR	Traffic brake van (Air/Vacuum 'dual' pipe)	Air brake and vacuum brake through pipe
CAV	Traffic brake van (Vacuum brake)	Vacuum brake only

Brake vans that were reassigned to engineering use, were typically reissued a new TOPS code, starting with a "Z", as was standard for any engineering wagon of any type. The second letter, "T", indicated the vehicle was a brake van.

TOPS codes for brake vans in departmental stock
TOPS Code	CARKND Name	Brake type
YTV	Bogie brake van (Vacuum brake)	Vacuum brake only
YTX	Bogie brake van (Dual brake - Air/vacuum)	Air and vacuum brake
ZTO	Brake van (Unfitted)	Hand brake only
ZTP	Brake van (Vacuum pipe)	vacuum brake through pipe
ZTQ	Brake van (Air pipe)	Air brake through pipe
ZTR	Brake van (Air/Vacuum 'dual' pipe)	Air brake and vacuum brake through pipe
ZTV	Brake van (Vacuum brake)	Vacuum brake only

In addition to standard brake vans, a number of brake vans were used as the basis of a ballast spreading vehicle, fitted with a plough on each end that could be lowered, these vehicles were given "U".

TOPS codes for plough brake vans in departmental stock
TOPS Code	CARKND Name	Brake type
ZUA	Brake van plough (Air brake)	Air brake only
ZUB	Brake van plough van (Air brake & vacuum pipe)	Air brake and vacuum brake through pipe
ZUP	Brake van plough (Vacuum pipe)	Vacuum through pipe
ZUQ	Brake van plough (Air pipe)	Air brake through pipe
ZUV	Brake van plough (Vacuum brake)	Vacuum brake only
ZUW	Brake van plough (Vacuum brake)	Vacuum brake and air brake through pipe

== See also ==
- Brake van
- Caboose - North American equivalent
- Brake Tender - A British Railways rail vehicle without a space for a crew member to ride on, intended to provide additional brake power for early diesel locomotives.
