= Standard Open =

British Rail Standard Open
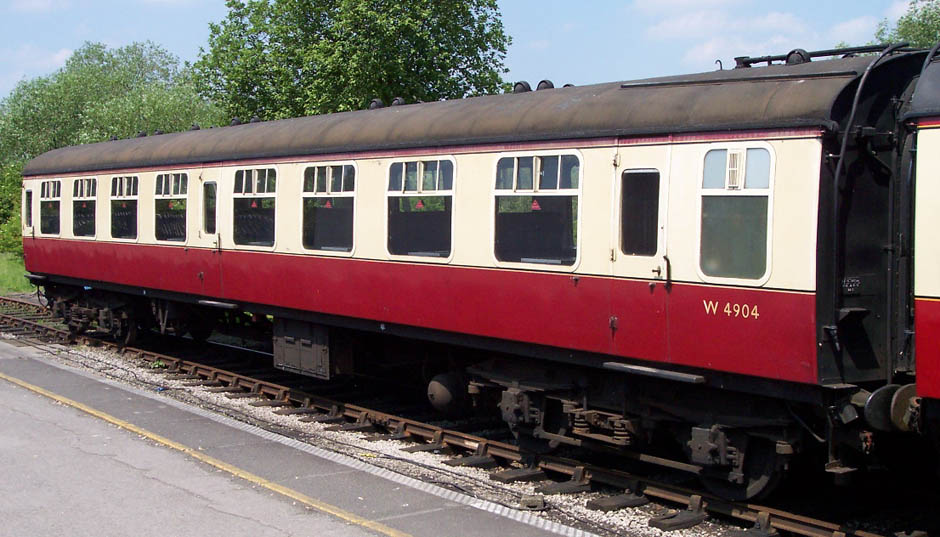
- A Mk1 TSO at the Midland Railway - Butterley in 2006
- In service: 1963–
- Manufacturer: BR Derby (C&W), Eastleigh, York Works and Birmingham Railway Carriage and Wagon Company
- Number built: Mark 1: 111, Mark 2: 28
- Capacity: 48 Second
- Operators: British Rail

Specifications
- Car length: 64 ft 6 in (19.66 m)
- Width: 9 ft 3 in (2.82 m)
- Height: 12 ft 9 1/2 in (3.90 m)
- Maximum speed: BR1: 90 mph (145 km/h), B4: 100 mph (161 km/h)
- Weight: 32–33 tonnes (31–32 long tons; 35–36 short tons)
- Bogies: BR1 or B4

Second Open or Standard Open (coded SO) is a British coach designation for open-saloon second class (later standard class) coaches with 2+1 abreast seating, usually seating 48 passengers. Second class coaches with more conventional 2+2 abreast seating were designated Tourist Standard Open (TSO) seating 64 passengers.

There were a number of variations. The majority (95) were built using the same body shell as the Mark 1 SK and TSO. When production started, these were classified as third class. There were also 15 "true" second-class coaches, also known as "Boat Seconds" as they were used on boat trains for continental destinations (European mainland railways still had three classes). These rare vehicles had an interior layout to almost first-class standards with 2+1 seating (total 48 seats) and a central door without vestibule. When the European railways agreed in 1956 to abolish third class, British Railways simply reclassified third-class vehicles as second class except for the special "Boat Seconds" which after some deliberation were finally reclassified as first class carriages in 1959. There was also a one-off experimental 39-seat SO built by BRCW as part of the Mark 1 new prototype scheme. In 1965 the new Mark 2 designs incorporated a small run of just 28 Mark 2a SO carriages.

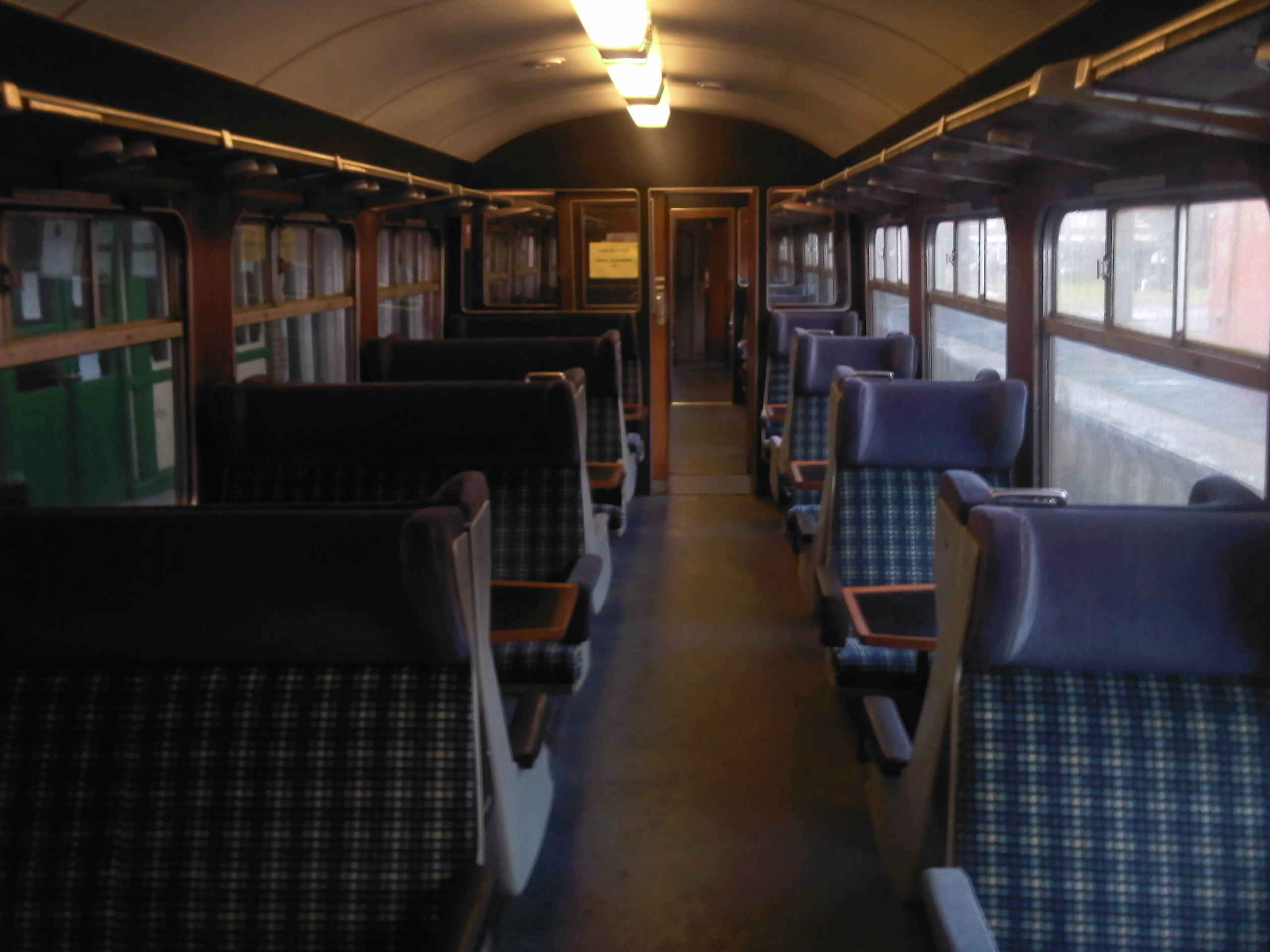
Interior detail of a Mk2a SO.

== See also ==
- Open coach
