= B2 class =

B2 class or Class B2 may refer to:

- B2-class Melbourne tram
- LB&SCR B2 class, 4-4-0 steam locomotives
- LCDR B2 class, 0-6-0 steam locomotives
- LNER Class B2
- LNER Thompson Class B2, 4-6-0 steam locomotives
