= Coaches of the London and North Eastern Railway =

The London and North Eastern Railway (LNER) inherited several styles of coaching stock from its constituents. Sir Nigel Gresley continued the styles that he had established pre-grouping at the Great Northern Railway (GNR) and for the East Coast Joint Stock.

== Coaches inherited from pre-grouping companies ==
Various types of coaches were inherited from pre-grouping companies.

=== Ex-Great North of Scotland Railway ===
Two GNSR six-wheel coaches of c.1896 are preserved on the Strathspey Railway. A number of GNSR coach bodies have been saved for restoration at Ferryhill Railway Heritage Centre, Aberdeen. One, a full brake, is nearing completion. The GNSR Royal Saloon of 1898 is preserved by the Scottish Railway Preservation Society at Bo'ness. Another six-wheeler is preserved at Embsay, it being the only operational Scottish carriage in England.

=== Ex-East Coast Joint Stock ===
A number of these vehicles remain extant on various heritage railways including the NYMR and the Embsay and Bolton Abbey Steam Railway in addition to the NRM, some being over 100 years old.

=== Ex-Great Northern Railway ===
Amongst other GNR coaches elsewhere Corridor Composite 2701 is fully restored and operational on the Severn Valley Railway. After withdrawal from mainline service it was converted to Camp Coach 157 and located at Mundesley, Norfolk.

Great Northern Railway Lavatory Composite Brake No. 2856 is with the Vintage Carriage Trust at Ingrow on the Keighley & Worth Valley Railway. A six-wheel postal carriage from 1885 is also preserved on the Nene Valley Railway.

== Coaches built by the LNER ==
=== Quadart stock ===
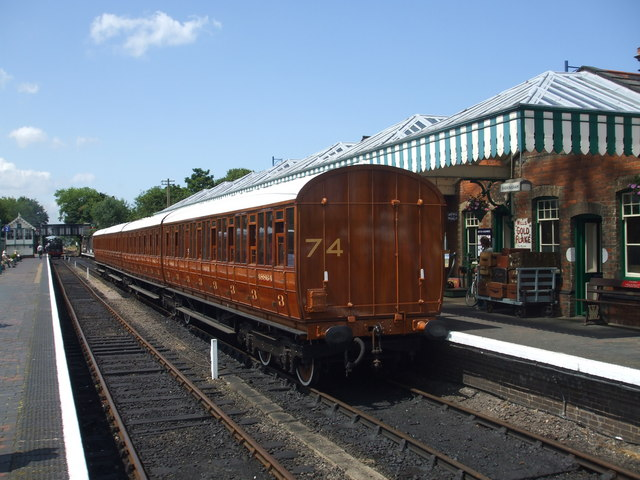
The 'Quadart' set at Sheringham Station on the North Norfolk Railway

Gresley first introduced articulation in passenger stock in 1907 using converted vehicles, but in 1911 he produced some articulated suburban stock for the GNR. These were articulated pairs and were later rebuilt as four-coach ('Quadart') units. From 1921 to 1929 further 'Quadart' compartment stock was built with an eventual total of 97 GNR and LNER sets.

Two 'Quadarts' formed an eight-coach train. Because of their high seating capacity they were popular with the operators and some continued in traffic until April 1966. One set is preserved by the Midland and Great Northern Joint Railway Society at the North Norfolk Railway.

=== Standard corridor stock ===
The standard LNER corridor coach design was finalised in 1923, using a 60 ft underframe, though some for use on the Great Eastern were on 51 ft underframes. The LNER standard coach was in advance of those of the other three of the Big Four by virtue of the Pullman gangways and buckeye couplers. The wooden teak-panelled body with squared mouldings and windows was more traditional than modern, particularly as the LNER persisted with this construction until 1942. In fact, there were few differences in design over the 1923-42 period, apart from an increase in body width to 9 ft 3in after 1927. All these standard coaches were mounted on Gresley double-bolster 8 ft 6in bogies. The general service stock was withdrawn by 1965. Several examples are preserved.

=== Observation saloons ===
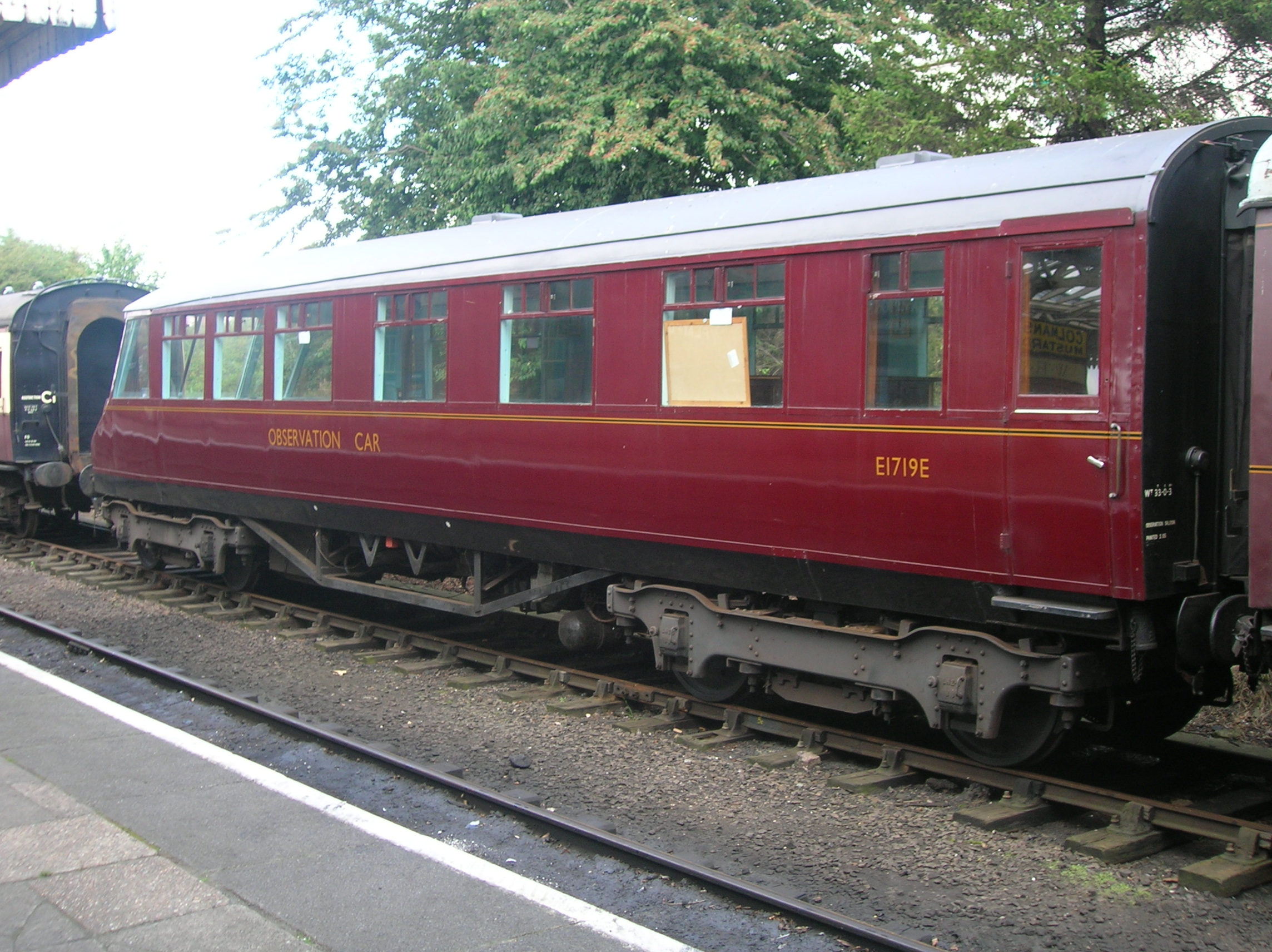
Observation car E1719E, here preserved in British Railways maroon livery, viewed from the corridor end

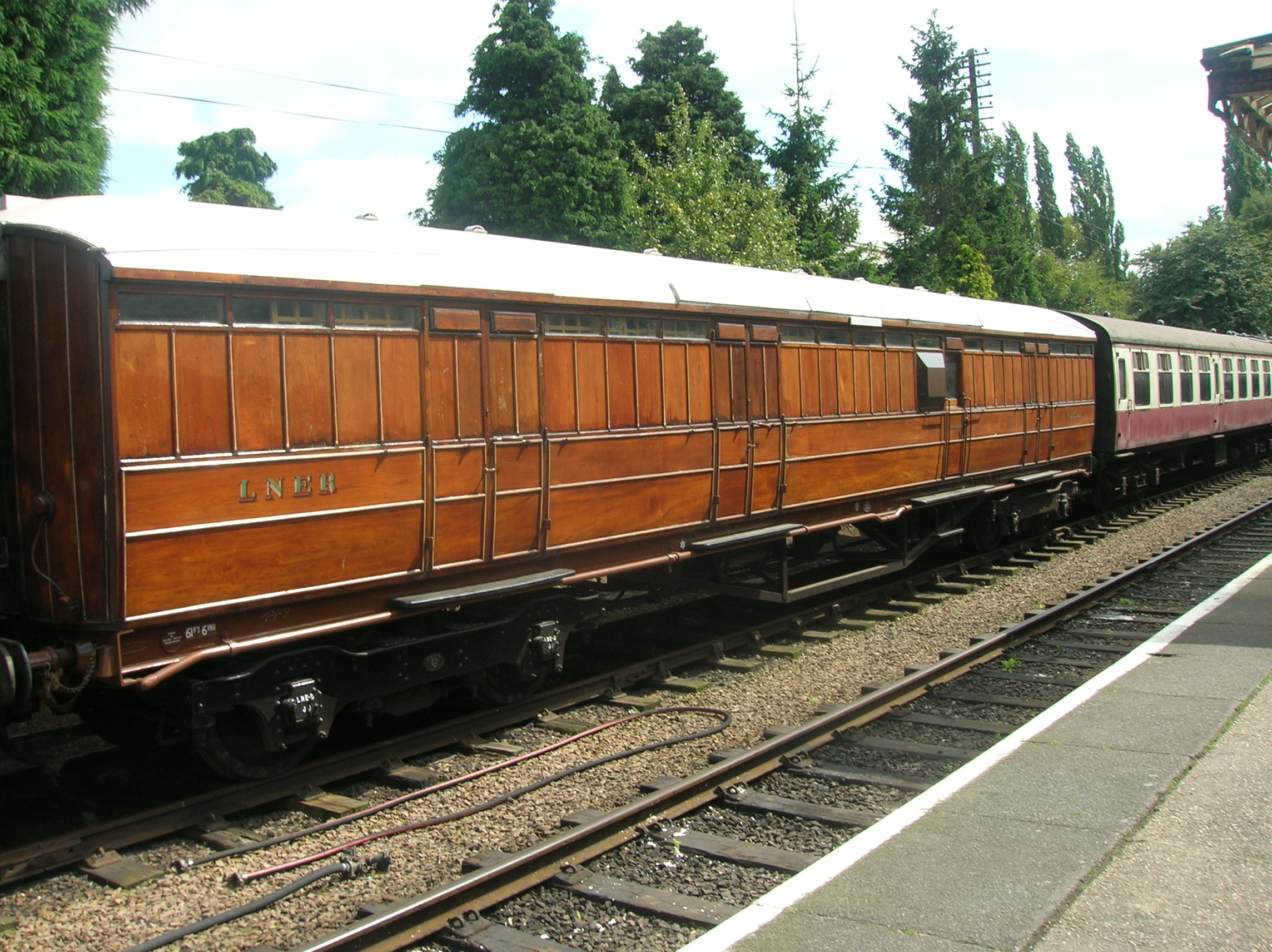
Restored, teak-bodied pigeon van BGP 4050 at Loughborough

In 1937, the LNER built two observation coaches at Doncaster Works for use on The Coronation express passenger train during the summer months. Looking quite different to the teak coaches, they in many respects resembled the LNER Class A4 locomotives that hauled the train. The carriages had a conventional corridor connection at one end and a deeply glazed tapered end at the other, so many enthusiast referred to them as Beavertails. Both were fitted out with Art Deco styling and a luxury bar/lounge combination.

During the Second World War both vehicles were put into storage, and in 1959, they were both rebuilt by British Railways with larger panoramic windows for use on specials along the West Highland Line. Withdrawn from service by the late 1960s, both vehicles were preserved, and are now in the hands of Railway Vehicle Preservations Ltd on the preserved Great Central Railway, Loughborough, where E1719E was restored in its 1960s rebuilt condition by 2007, and between then and 2019, they allowed first class ticket holders to travel in it. Following a further overhaul, the vehicle went on loan to the Strathspey Railway in Scotland in 2023. After many negotiations, E1729E moved to Nemesis Rail, where it was restored to its as-built condition by 2021, and is now on display at the One: One collection at Margate, Kent.

=== Pigeon vans ===
Pigeon vans (British Rail classification: BGP) were fairly common rail vehicles on the LNER, which built dozens in the late 1930s and early 1940s. Although designed for transporting racing pigeons to release locations, with very little modification they could also carry mail or other freight. The first batch was made of teak wood, treated with varnish, but the economic climate of World War II meant that many batches were built with steel bodies to the same basic design.

== Withdrawal and preservation ==
The last two LNER loco-hauled passenger coaches were Buffet/Restaurant cars SC1705E and SC1706E of 1948, although there were still 41 Covered Carriage Trucks (CCT) and 9 six-wheeled brake vans (BZ) officially on the BR stock book in 1978. However, at this time non-BR design carriage stock was being scrapped quickly and there had been 7 passenger carrying and 180 non-passenger carrying LNER coaches in BR stock only 2 years earlier.

One steel-built pigeon van has been preserved, as have 14 of the teak coaches.5 pigeon vans have been restored and are used on heritage railways as guard's vans on passenger trains and mail drop recreations.

The Severn Valley Railway has 7 LNER teak coaches including Buffet No. 643, Kitchen Composite No. 7960, Open Thirds Nos, 24105, 43600, 43612, 52250 along with former pre-grouping GNR composite No. 2701.

The North Yorkshire Moors Railway also has 11 coaches originating from the LNER and its constituents including ECJS 189 dating from 1896. This vehicle is being restored at Pickering to its former glory, by the LNER Coach Association (Registered Charity no.1095337) in its later modified form, as a sumptuous 33 seat third class diner having originally been built as a 42-seat vehicle.

In total 38 LNER Teak Coaches have been preserved, although the Railway Heritage Register Partnership record a total of 195 ex-LNER coaches still existing (at least in part), including 39 that have subsequently been scrapped.

== Bibliography ==
- Harris, Michael (1976). Preserved Railway Coaches. Shepperton: Ian Allan Ltd. ISBN 0-7110-0664-4.
