= Silver Jubilee (train) =

London and North Eastern Railway train

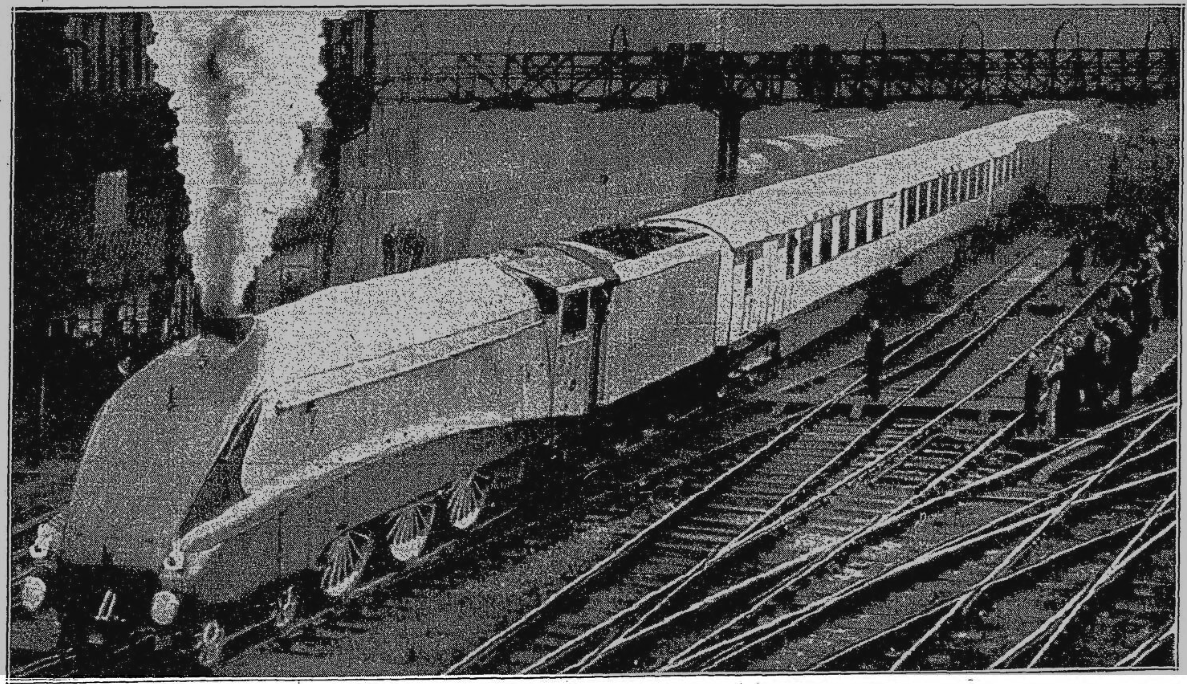
- The Silver Jubilee train leaving King's Cross on 27 September 1935 on a trial run north during which it attained a record speed of 112 miles per hour (180 km/h)

Overview
- Service type: Passenger train
- First service: 30 September 1935
- Former operators: London and North Eastern Railway; British Rail

Route
- Termini: London King's Cross; Newcastle
- Service frequency: Daily
- Line used: East Coast Main Line

The Silver Jubilee was a named train of the London and North Eastern Railway (LNER) that ran between 1935 and 1939.

== History ==
Inspired by the success of the streamlined high-speed two-car diesel Fliegender Hamburger service between Berlin and Hamburg introduced by Deutsche Reichsbahn in 1933, the LNER proposed the following year to introduce a similar high-speed service between London and Newcastle during 1935. Over the next few months, the plans were all changed to comprise a normal-length train hauled by a steam locomotive, all being streamlined. The service was to run once per day in each direction, departing from Newcastle Central at 10:00 am and returning from London King's Cross at 5:30 pm.

To operate the service, an entirely new train was constructed – four locomotives (one of which was spare) and seven carriages were ordered in March 1935, all to new designs. The four locomotives were LNER Class A4, but only one of these, No. 2509 Silver Link, was ready in time for the introduction of the service – the others followed at intervals until December. The carriages were all ready in time for trial runs to be made on 27 September 1935. One set of special carriages were built for the two daily services, which were not used on any other service.

It commenced service on 30 September 1935, the train travelling between London King's Cross and Newcastle. It did this at an average speed of 67 mph (108 km/h), taking four hours to complete the journey. The high average speed was maintained by running at high speeds uphill.

The train was made to commemorate the year of King George V's Silver Jubilee, and was painted silver and grey throughout. It was composed of two twin-set articulated coaches, and one triplet-set; seven coaches in total.

On 6 November 1935, the newlywed Duke and Duchess of Gloucester travelled on the Silver Jubilee from St Pancras to Kettering for a honeymoon at nearby Boughton House, one of the bride's family homes.

In February 1938, an eighth coach was inserted into the third class twin set, bringing the total to eight coaches.

The train set a new standard for speed in Britain at that time. Service continued until the outbreak of the Second World War in 1939.

== Technical details ==
Engine and train: total length 462 ft 2 3/8 in (140.88 m) Total weight: 385 long tons (391 t; 431 short tons).

== Revival ==
The name was briefly applied to one train per day between King's Cross and Edinburgh Waverley in 1977 for the Silver Jubilee of Elizabeth II.

== See also ==
- The Coronation
- East Anglian
