= LNER Class B2 =

LNER Class B2 may refer to:

- GCR Class 1 ("Sir Sam Fay" Class), steam locomotives designated LNER Class B2 between 1923 and 1945
- LNER Thompson Class B2, steam locomotives introduced 1945
