= LNER Class B17 =

Class of LNER 4-6-0 steam locomotives

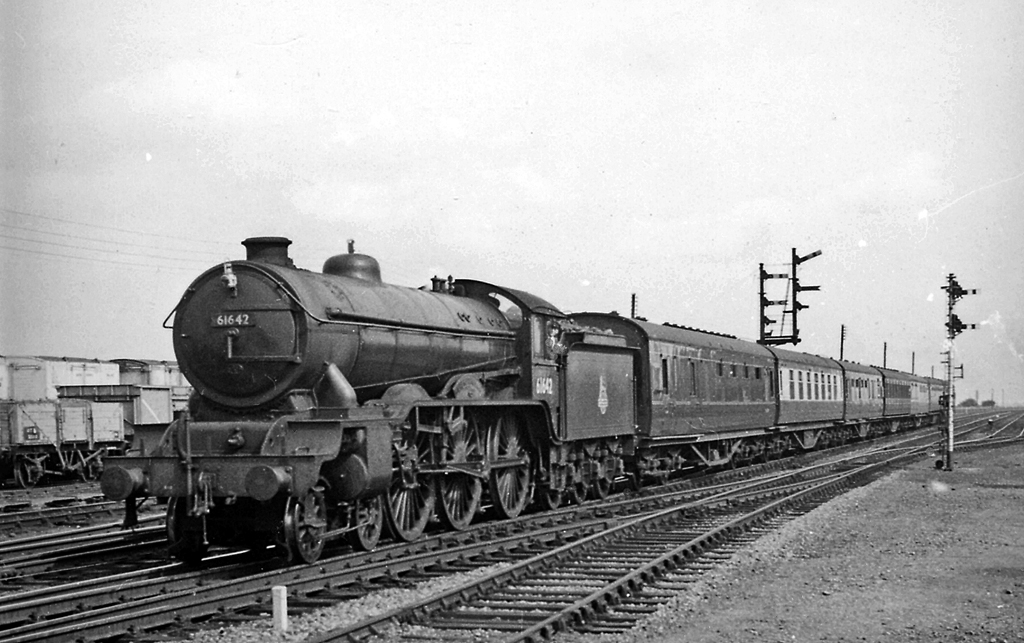
- B17/6 No. 61642 Kilverstone Hall.
Type and origin
- Power type: Steam
- Designer: Nigel Gresley
- Builder: North British Locomotive Co. (10); Darlington Works (52); R. Stephenson & Co. (11)
- Serial number: NBL: 23803–23812; RS: 4124–4134
- Build date: 1928–1937
- Total produced: 73
Specifications
- Configuration
  - Whyte: 4-6-0
  - UIC: 2′C h3
- Gauge: 4 ft 8 1/2 in (1,435 mm) standard gauge
- Leading dia.: 3 ft 2 in (0.965 m)
- Driver dia.: 6 ft 8 in (2.032 m)
- Length: 62 ft 2 in (18.95 m)
- Width: 8 ft 11 in (2.72 m)
- Height: 12 ft 11 in (3.94 m)
- Axle load: 18 long tons (18.3 t; 20.2 short tons)
- Loco weight: 77.25–80.5 long tons (78.49–81.79 t; 86.52–90.16 short tons)
- Fuel type: Coal
- Boiler
  - Diameter: 5 ft 4.75 in (1,644.6 mm) to 5 ft 6 in (1,680 mm) outside
- Boiler pressure: B17/1 to B17/5: 200 psi (1.38 MPa); B17/6: 225 psi (1.55 MPa)
- Heating surface
  - Firebox: 168 sq ft (15.6 m^{2})
  - Total surface: 1,676 sq ft (155.7 m^{2})
- Superheater
  - Heating area: 344 sq ft (32.0 m^{2})
- Cylinders: Three
- Cylinder size: 17 1/2 in × 26 in (444 mm × 660 mm)
- Valve gear: Outside: Walschaerts; Inside: Gresley conjugated
- Valve type: 8-inch (203 mm) piston valves
Performance figures
- Tractive effort: B17/1 to B17/5: 25,380 lbf (112.9 kN); B17/6: 28,553 lbf (127.0 kN)
Career
- Operators: London and North Eastern Railway » British Railways
- Power class: BR: B17/1 to B17/5: 4MT; B17/6: 5P4F
- Nicknames: Footballers, Sandringhams
- Axle load class: Route Availability 5
- Withdrawn: 1952–1960
- Disposition: All original locomotives scrapped but tender of one is preserved; one new-build under construction

The London and North Eastern Railway (LNER) Class B17, also known as "Sandringham" or "Footballer" class, was a class of 4-6-0 steam locomotive designed by Nigel Gresley for hauling passenger services on the Great Eastern Main Line. In total 73 were built.

== Background ==
By 1926, the former GER's Class S69 (LNER Class B12) locomotives were no longer able to cope with the heaviest express passenger trains on the Great Eastern Main Line between London and Cambridge, Ipswich and Norwich. Yet Gresley was unable to use his larger classes due to severe weight restrictions on the line. The requirement for a lightweight yet powerful 4-6-0 proved to be difficult to achieve.

== Design ==
After several unsuccessful attempts by Doncaster Works to satisfy Gresley's specification, the contract for the detailed design and building of the class was given to the North British Locomotive Company in 1927. They used several features from a batch of A1 Pacifics they had built in 1924. The cab, cylinders, and motion had all been copied directly or slightly modified. Most of the boiler design was taken from the LNER Class K3 2-6-0 and LNER Class O2 2-8-0 designs. Darlington Works provided drawings for the bogies, and Stratford Works designs for the GE-type 3,700-imperial-gallon (17,000 L; 4,400 US gal), 4-long-ton (4.1 t) tender, as used with Class B12. However, the two designs presented by the NB Loco Co. had an axle loading of 18 tons and 19 tons, respectively. The 18 ton design, being lighter, was chosen. Since it had an axle loading of 18 tons, 1 ton higher than the initial requirement of 17 tons, this meant that the B17’s route availability was “certain GER main lines” instead of the full range which was intended, although the LNER did accept the restriction.

Due to weight restrictions it proved to be impossible for all three cylinders to drive the middle coupled axle. Therefore, the design used divided drive with the middle cylinder driving the leading axle and was positioned forward above the front bogie. The LNER also ordered some modifications, including an increase in cylinder size from 17 in (432 mm) to 17 1/2 in (444 mm), and a lengthening of the firebox by 5 in (127.0 mm) with longer frames, and lighter springs. The design continued to prove problematic and the LNER eventually cancelled a penalty clause in the original contract. The first locomotive, No. 2802 Walsingham was delivered 30 November 1928, thirteen weeks late.

== Construction ==
Ten locomotives were built by the North British Locomotive Company (works nos. 23803-12) during November and December, which were allocated the running numbers 2800-9. Five further orders were placed with Darlington Works between December 1928 and March 1935 for a further fifty-two locomotives to be delivered between August 1930 and June 1936. A final batch of eleven were ordered from Robert Stephenson and Company in February 1936 (works nos. 4124-34) for delivery between January and July 1937; resulting in a total of 73 B17s built.

=== Sub-classes ===
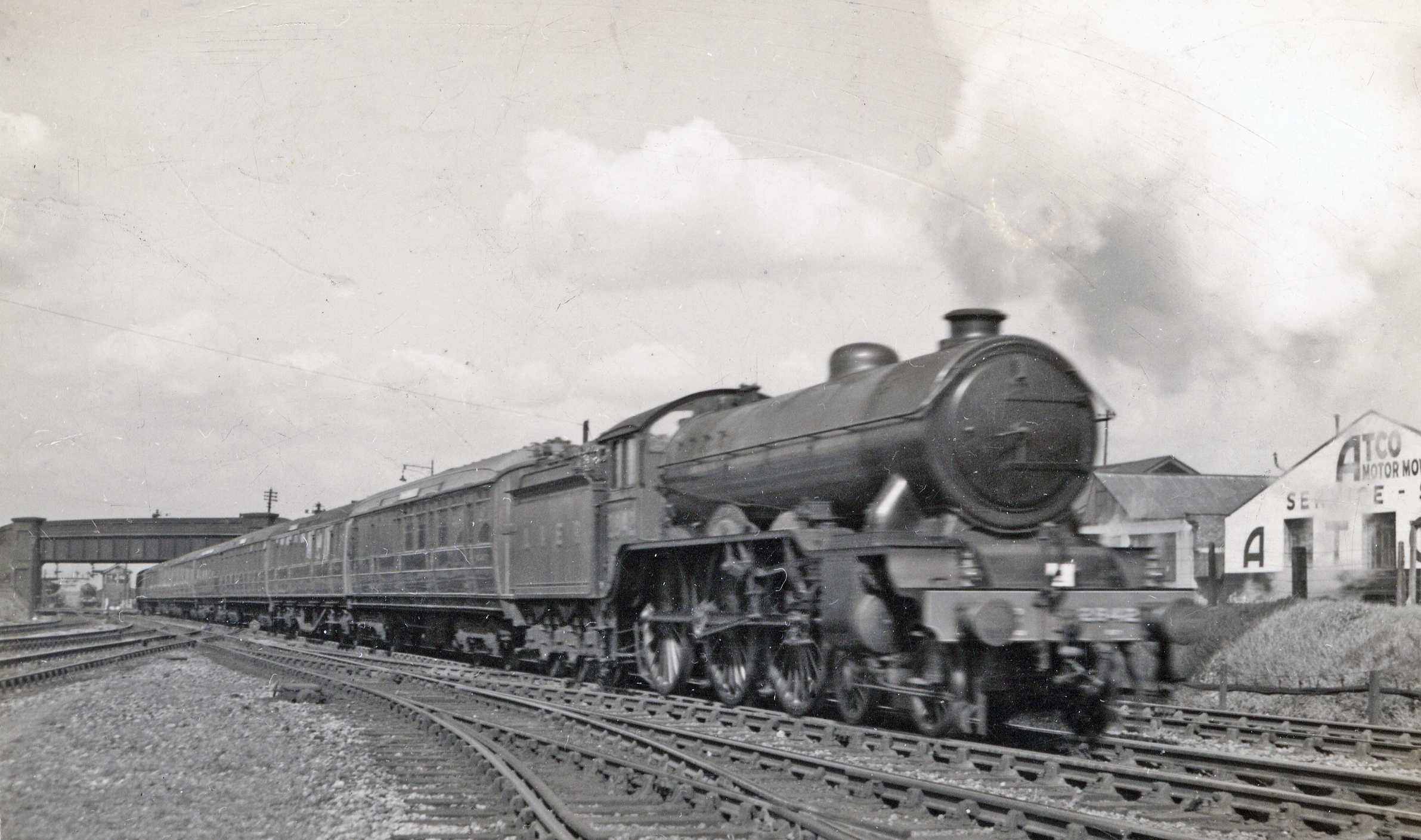
B17/2 class 4-6-0 No. 2842 'Kilverstone Hall' leaving Cambridge 1939

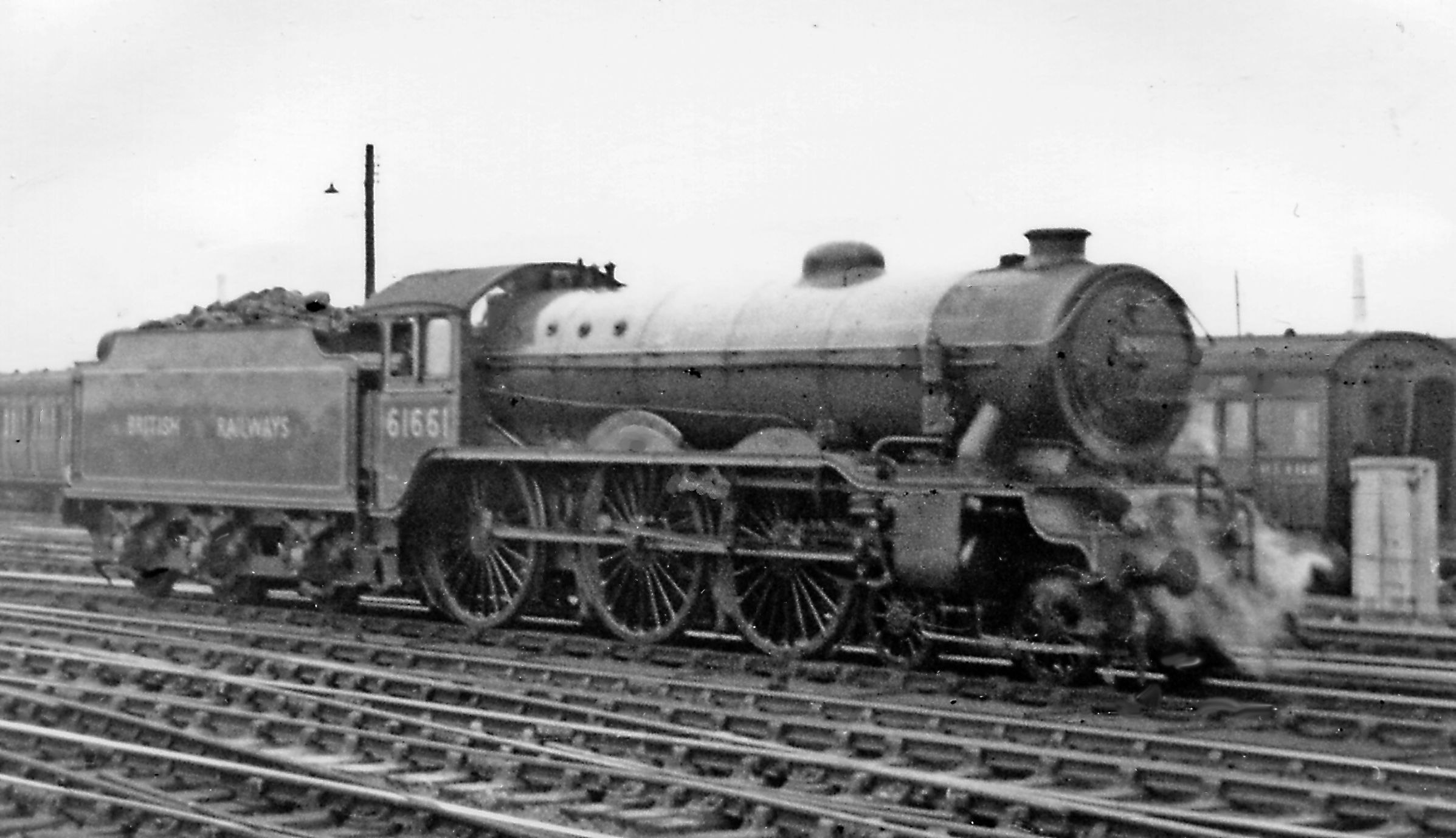
B17/4 No. 61661 'Sheffield Wednesday' at Stratford 12 June 1948

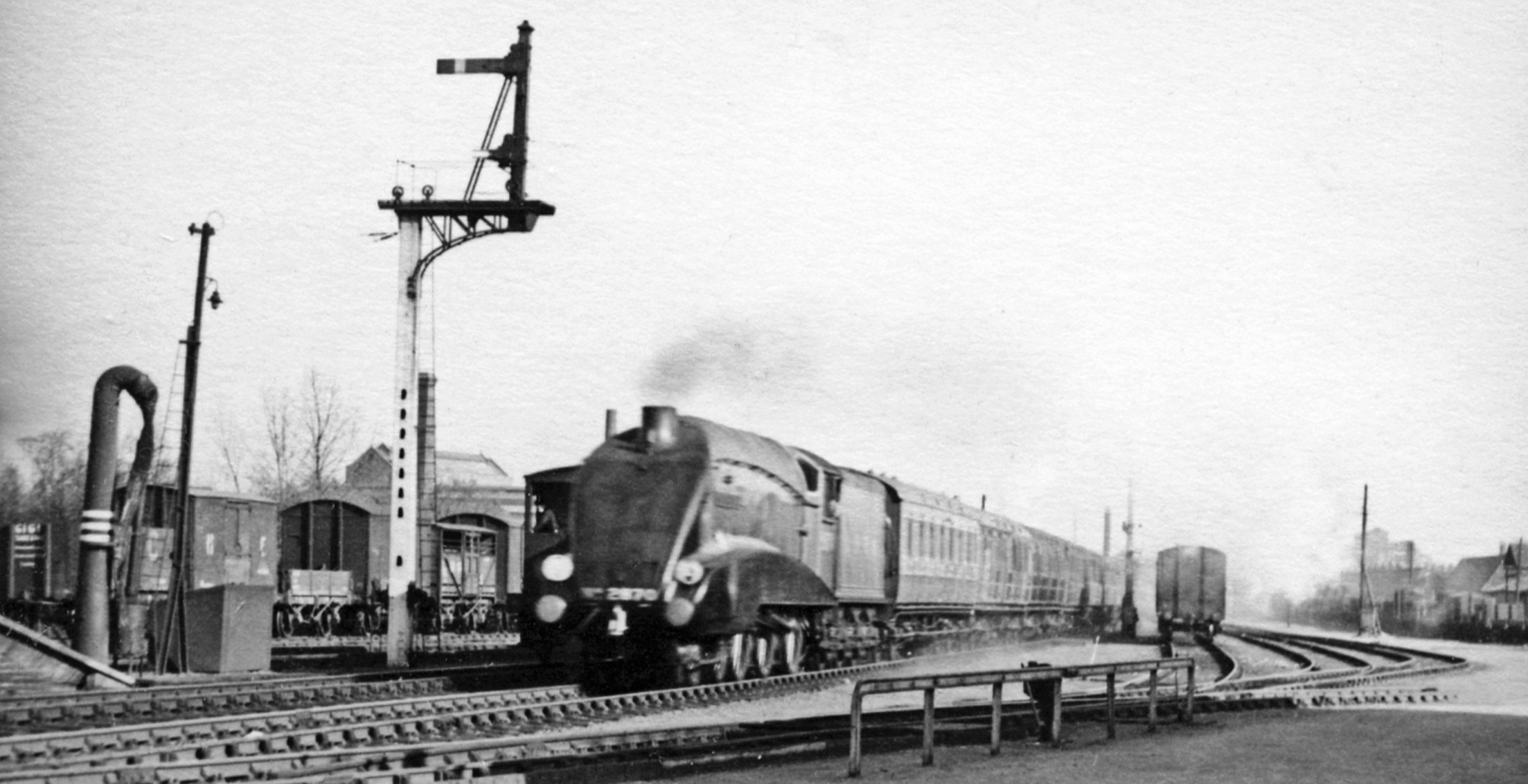
Streamlined B17/5 No. 2870 entering Stowmarket in 1940

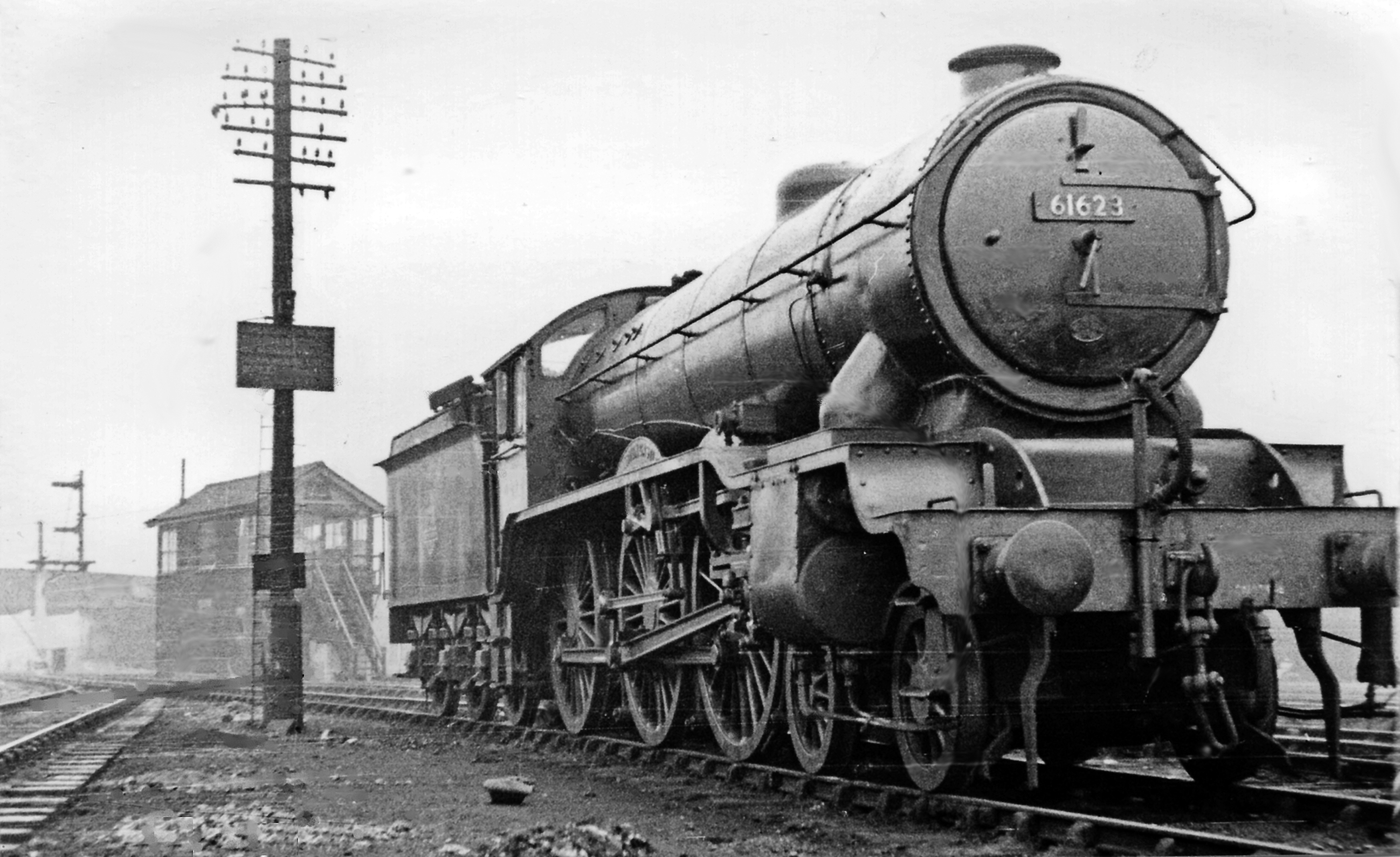
B17/6 No. 61623 'Lambton Castle' at Cambridge 28 February 1951

The first ten by the North British Locomotive Company were designated B17, later B17/1. The second and third batches had boilers supplied by Armstrong Whitworth and different springing and became B17/2. The next two batches had different springing and were designated B17/3. However, as the locomotives passed through the works the original springs were replaced by those of the later design and in 1937 the three sub-classes were merged into B17/1. These three sub-classes were all intended for the Great Eastern Section, where the turntables were no more than 50 ft (15 m) in diameter; accordingly, they used the 3,700-gallon tender, which was shorter than the LNER Group Standard tender, and for these, total wheelbase was 48 ft 4 in (14.73 m) and overall length 58 ft 4 in (17.78 m). The final Darlington batch introduced in 1936, and those built by Robert Stephenson and Company had 4,200-imperial-gallon (19,000 L; 5,000 US gal), 7.5-long-ton (7.6 t) tenders and were intended for use in the North Eastern area of the LNER: these were designated B17/4. They had a total wheelbase of 51 ft 0 in (15.54 m) and overall length of 62 ft 2 in (18.95 m). In the event, none were sent to the North Eastern Area - the whole class was allocated to the Southern Area, with those having the longer 4,200-gallon tender being based on the former Great Central Railway routes, where the turntables were larger.

In September 1937 two locomotives (Nos. 2859 Norwich City and 2870 Tottenham Hotspur) were streamlined in the manner of the LNER Class A4s, renamed East Anglian and City of London and intended for use on the East Anglian train. They were designated B17/5. However, the streamlining was cladding for publicity purposes only and had little effect on the overall speed of the locomotive. By 1951 both engines had been stripped of the streamlining altogether.

Between 1943 and 1957 most of the surviving members of the class were rebuilt with a LNER 100A boiler with increased pressure and were designated B17/6.

== Rebuilding ==
Ten B17s were rebuilt by Edward Thompson as 2-cylinder locomotives with a LNER 100A boiler, between 1945 and 1949, becoming the Class B2. No more were rebuilt because of the success of the Thompson's B1 class.

== Accidents and incidents ==
- On 4 October 1929, locomotive No. 2808 Gunton was hauling an express passenger train which was in collision with a freight train at Tottenham, London after the latter had departed against a danger signal and subsequently stopped foul of a junction.
- On 15 February 1937, locomotive No. 2829 Naworth Castle was hauling a passenger train that was derailed at Sleaford North Junction, Lincolnshire due to excessive speed on a curve. Four people were killed and sixteen were injured, one seriously.
- On 10 February 1941, locomotive No. 2828 Harewood House was hauling an express passenger train that came to a halt between Harold Wood and Brentwood, Essex as it was too heavy for the locomotive. A passenger train overran signals and was in a rear-end collision with the express. Seven people were killed and seventeen were seriously injured.
- On 16 January 1944, locomotive 2868 Bradford City was hauling a train from Great Yarmouth to Liverpool Street which was hit from behind by a train from Norwich in darkness and dense fog at Ilford station. Nine people were killed and 38 injured.
- On 2 January 1947, locomotive No. 1602 Walsingham was hauling an express passenger train that overran signals and was in a rear-end collision with a local passenger train at Gidea Park, Essex. Seven people were killed and 45 were hospitalised.

== Summary table ==
Originally numbered 2800–72, the whole class were renumbered 1600–72 between January 1946 and January 1947. Between 4/1948 and 8/1950, British Railways increased the numbers by 60000, becoming 61600–72. For both renumbering schemes, some locomotives were renumbered during or after rebuilding to Class B2.

LNER No.	BR No.	Original Name (Rename(s))	Date built	Date rebuilt	Rebuilt as	Date withdrawn	Notes
2800	61600	Sandringham	December 1928	June 1950	B17/6	July 1958	
2801	61601	Holkham	December 1928	—	—	January 1958	
2802	61602	Walsingham	November 1928	October 1951	B17/6	January 1958	
2803	61603	Framlingham	December 1928	October 1946	B2	September 1958	
2804	61604	Elveden	December 1928	November 1951	B17/6	August 1953	
2805	61605	Burnham Thorpe (Lincolnshire Regiment from April 1938)	December 1928	January 1948	B17/6	May 1958	
2806	61606	Audley End	December 1928	March 1950	B17/6	September 1958	
2807	61607	Blickling	December 1928	May 1947	B2	December 1959	
2808	61608	Gunton	December 1928	October 1950	B17/6	March 1960	
2809	61609	Quidenham	December 1928	January 1952	B17/6	June 1958	
2810	61610	Honingham Hall	August 1930	October 1953	B17/6	January 1960	
2811	61611	Raynham Hall	August 1930	February 1956	B17/6	October 1959	
2812	61612	Houghton Hall	October 1930	March 1950	B17/6	September 1959	
2813	61613	Woodbastwick Hall	October 1930	December 1951	B17/6	December 1959	
2814	61614	Castle Hedingham	October 1930	November 1946	B2	June 1959	
2815	61615	Culford Hall	October 1930	April 1946	B2	February 1959	
2816	61616	Fallodon	October 1930	November 1945	B2	September 1959	
2817	61617	Ford Castle	November 1930	December 1946	B2	August 1958	
2818	61618	Wynyard Park	November 1930	April 1958	B17/6	January 1960	
2819	61619	Welbeck Abbey	November 1930	January 1953	B17/6	September 1958	
2820	61620	Clumber	November 1930	December 1951	B17/6	January 1960	
2821	61621	Hatfield House	November 1930	January 1955	B17/6	November 1958	
2822	61622	Alnwick Castle	January 1931	October 1943	B17/6	September 1958	
2823	61623	Lambton Castle	February 1931	April 1948	B17/6	July 1959	
2824	61624	Lumley Castle	February 1931	—	—	March 1953	
2825	61625	Raby Castle	February 1931	—	—	December 1959	
2826	61626	Brancepeth Castle	March 1931	April 1955	B17/6	January 1960	
2827	61627	Aske Hall	March 1931	November 1948	B17/6	July 1959	
2828	61628	Harewood House	March 1931	December 1948	B17/6	September 1952	First to be withdrawn
2829	61629	Naworth Castle	April 1931	—	—	September 1959	
2830	61630	Thoresby Park (Tottenham Hotspur from January 1938)	April 1931	December 1948	B17/6	August 1958	
2831	61631	Serlby Hall	May 1931	October 1957	B17/6	April 1959	
2832	61632	Belvoir Castle (Royal Sovereign from September 1958)	May 1931	June 1947	B2	February 1959	
2833	61633	Kimbolton Castle	May 1931	August 1948	B17/6	September 1959	
2834	61634	Hinchingbrooke	June 1931	January 1957	B17/6	August 1958	
2835	61635	Milton	July 1931	January 1949	B17/6	January 1959	
2836	61636	Harlaxton Manor	July 1931	May 1950	B17/6	October 1959	
2837	61637	Thorpe Hall	March 1933	November 1957	B17/6	September 1959	
2838	61638	Melton Hall	March 1933	December 1948	B17/6	March 1958	
2839	61639	Rendlesham Hall (Norwich City from January 1938)	May 1933	January 1946	B2	May 1959	
2840	61640	Somerleyton Hall	May 1933	May 1955	B17/6	November 1958	
2841	61641	Gayton Hall	May 1933	February 1949	B17/6	January 1960	
2842	61642	Kilverstone Hall	May 1933	January 1949	B17/6	September 1958	
2843	61643	Champion Lodge	May 1935	October 1954	B17/6	July 1958	
2844	61644	Earlham Hall	May 1935	March 1949	B2	February 1959	
2845	61645	The Suffolk Regiment	June 1935	December 1952	B17/6	February 1959	
2846	61646	Gilwell Park	August 1935	February 1951	B17/6	January 1959	
2847	61647	Helmingham Hall	September 1935	February 1958	B17/6	November 1959	Hauled the funeral train of King George V from Wolferton to King's Cross on 23 January 1936.
2848	61648	Arsenal	March 1936	October 1957	B17/6	December 1958	
2849	61649	Sheffield United	March 1936	March 1954	B17/6	February 1959	
2850	61650	Grimsby Town	March 1936	February 1955	B17/6	September 1958	
2851	61651	Derby County	March 1936	June 1953	B17/6	August 1959	
2852	61652	Darlington	April 1936	March 1948	B17/6	September 1959	
2853	61653	Huddersfield Town	April 1936	May 1954	B17/6	January 1960	
2854	61654	Sunderland	April 1936	April 1948	B17/6	November 1959	
2855	61655	Middlesbrough	April 1936	July 1950	B17/6	April 1959	
2856	61656	Leeds United	May 1936	November 1953	B17/6	January 1960	
2857	61657	Doncaster Rovers	May 1936	October 1950	B17/6	June 1960	
2858	61658	Newcastle United (The Essex Regiment from June 1936)	May 1936	September 1950	B17/6	December 1959	
2859	61659	Norwich City (East Anglian from September 1937)	June 1936	July 1949	B17/6	March 1960	
2860	61660	Hull City	June 1936	—	—	June 1960	
2861	61661	Sheffield Wednesday	June 1936	August 1955	B17/6	July 1959	
2862	61662	Manchester United	January 1937	March 1955	B17/6	December 1959	
2863	61663	Everton	February 1937	November 1951	B17/6	February 1960	
2864	61664	Liverpool	January 1937	October 1943	B17/6	June 1960	
2865	61665	Leicester City	January 1937	August 1949	B17/6	April 1959	
2866	61666	Nottingham Forest	February 1937	December 1947	B17/6	March 1960	
2867	61667	Bradford	April 1937	—	—	June 1958	
2868	61668	Bradford City	April 1937	June 1949	B17/6	August 1960	Last to be withdrawn
2869	61669	Barnsley	May 1937	September 1949	B17/6	September 1958	
2870	61670	Manchester City (Tottenham Hotspur from May 1937) (City of London from September 1937)	May 1937	April 1951	B17/6	April 1960	
2871	61671	Manchester City (Royal Sovereign from April 1946)	June 1937	August 1948	B2	September 1958	
2872	61672	West Ham United	July 1937	September 1950	B17/6	March 1960	
*2873	61673	Spirit of Sandringham	-	-	-	-	Newbuild member of the class.

== Preservation and revival ==
Among enthusiasts, the class was referred to as "footballers" as several members were named after football clubs. None of the class have survived into preservation but a few of the football clubs the locomotives were named after were presented with the nameplates after the locomotives themselves were cut up.

An operational locomotive being developed by the B17 Steam Locomotive Trust will become the newest member of the class, 61673 Spirit of Sandringham. The frames of a Great Eastern Railway tender, fitted with an original axle from 61602 'Walsingham', and a LNER tender have been secured for the project. A static chassis for the locomotive has been constructed at Llangollen Railway Engineering Services. Fundraising for the driving wheels is ongoing with three fully funded through the 'Put a Spoke in My Wheel' campaign. In October 2020 the project relocated to CTL Seal's premises in Sheffield, with the chassis moving from Llangollen and the tenders from the Mid-Norfolk Railway.

The North British Locomotive Preservation Group were engaged in a project to build a non-operational LNER Class B17 4-6-0 replica, named after a football club, 61662 Manchester United. By May 2019, many parts of the locomotive were being fixed together for display at the groups Mizens Railway base. In time, they intended to develop the replica into an operational locomotive, but in November 2020 they announced that the project was being terminated, with re-usable components, including the original tender, being donated to the B17 Steam Locomotive Trust.

== Modelling ==
Having previously produced tender drive OO gauge models of the "Footballer"-spec B17s, Hornby Railways released an all-new locomotive drive model of the B17 in 2013, available in both B17/1 and B17/6 subclasses with either the small GER-region tender or the larger LNER group standard 4200 gallon tender.

Dapol manufacture a model of a B17 in British N gauge, which was awarded Steam Model Railway Locomotive of the year for N gauge.
