= East Anglian (train) =

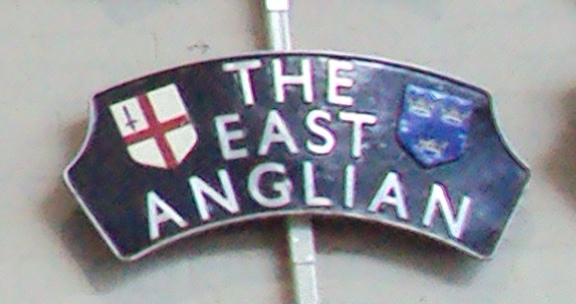
- Headboard at the National Railway Museum

Overview
- Service type: Passenger train
- First service: 27 September 1937
- Former operator: LNER

Route
- Termini: London Liverpool Street; Norwich
- Distance travelled: 114 miles 40 chains (184.3 km)
- Service frequency: Daily
- Line used: Great Eastern Main Line

The streamlined East Anglian service of the London and North Eastern Railway was introduced on 27 September 1937, soon after the Coronation and the West Riding Limited, but differed from those – and from the Silver Jubilee of 1935 – in several respects. It did not use new Class A4 4-6-2 locomotives but instead existing Class B17 4-6-0s were given a streamlined casing; although new carriages were built, these were neither articulated nor streamlined; there was no special livery; it ran at speeds not much greater than those achieved by existing expresses on the Norwich line; and there was no supplementary fare.

== Locomotives ==
The two locomotives were converted during September 1937 from existing Class B17/4 locomotives, nos. 2859 and 2870, which had been built in June 1936 and May 1937 respectively (Class B17/4 had the Group Standard 4,200-imperial-gallon (19,000 L; 5,000 US gal) tender of wheelbase 13 feet 6 inches (4.11 m), shared with Classes D49, J39, K3, etc.; as opposed to Classes B17/1 to B17/3 which had a 3,700-imperial-gallon (17,000 L; 4,400 US gal) tender of wheelbase 12 feet 0 inches (3.66 m)). The footplate was removed, a streamlined casing similar to (but shorter than) that of Class A4 was fitted over the existing outer boiler covering, the cab sides were replaced, and the tender sides increased in height; they were renamed from Norwich City and Tottenham Hotspur to East Anglian and City of London respectively (the displaced football club names were used to rename Class B17/2 nos. 2839 and 2830); and they were reclassified B17/5. The longer tender and the streamlined front gave these two locomotives an overall length of 62 feet 9 inches (19.13 m), compared to the 58 feet 4 inches (17.78 m) of the other Class B17 locomotives on the Great Eastern section, but were still over eight feet shorter than an A4. Livery was LNER green, lined out in black and white; the side valances were black, and on the smokebox sides, the green met the black in a parabolic arc similar to that of Class A4.

The two locomotives were allocated to Norwich (Thorpe), but were not confined to the East Anglian service. Typically, one would work the East Anglian from Norwich to Liverpool Street, and return on less important services; the other would work lower-importance services from Norwich to London (such as the 15:17 Ipswich–Liverpool Street), and return with the East Anglian. When one locomotive was stopped for maintenance, the other would work the East Anglian in both directions; and on the rare occasions that neither was available, another B17 would be used.

The side valances were removed in August/September 1941; the locomotives were renumbered 1659 and 1670 in 1946, and 61659/70 in 1948. No. 61659 was given a Diagram 100A boiler (as designed for Class B1, and also used on classes B17/6, B2 and others) in July 1949, but unlike other locomotives fitted with this boiler, it was not reclassified, remaining Class B17/5. The streamlined casing was removed from both locomotives in April 1951, at which time no. 61670 was also fitted with the Diagram 100A boiler; following removal of the streamlined casing, they were both reclassified B17/6, in common with other B17s fitted with the Dia. 100A boiler (and retaining three cylinders).

== Carriages ==
One set of six carriages was approved in November 1936 for the 1937 Carriage Building Programme, and built against Lot no. 786 at York in 1937:

Type	Diagram	Seats	Number	1943 no.
Open Brake Third	240	36	62767	16721
Restaurant Kitchen First	236	18	677	9170
Open First	237	36	6483	11117
Open Third	239	48	60553	13675
Restaurant Kitchen Third	238	24	699	9172
Open Brake Third	240	36	62768	16722

Excluding the locomotive, the overall length was 377 feet 1 1/2 inches (114.95 m) and the tare weight was 219 long tons (223 t; 245 short tons). The first-class end was at the front as the train left Liverpool Street. Unlike the Coronation, there was no "beaver tail" observation car.

Unlike the special carriages built for the other streamlined services, the East Anglian carriages were not articulated, and were not streamlined either – they were of normal external appearance, with varnished teak finish, although they did conform to the latest LNER practice in that the external doors were in the vestibules, rather than in the seating areas. The body dimensions – 61 feet 6 inches (18.75 m)x9 feet 3 inches (2.82 m) (18.75 m × 2.82 m) (on 60 feet 0 inches or 18.29 metres underframes) – were the same as standard LNER carriages, and thus somewhat longer than general-service LNER carriages built for the GE section, which were typically 52 feet 6 inches (16.00 m) long (on 51 feet 0 inches or 15.54 metres underframes) until 1938. The bogies were of standard LNER pattern (having wheelbase 8 feet 6 inches (2.59 m)) as used with all other non-articulated Gresley stock. The internal styling was very similar to that of the Coronation and the West Riding Limited, except that the first class seating was arranged 2+1 instead of 1+1. There were no compartments, each carriage being divided into two or three open saloons; in both classes, seating was arranged 2+1 in bays of six, and all 198 seats were available for dining. Each seating bay had a table either side of the off-centre aisle, and the tables had two hinges along their length so that passengers could sit close to the tables without leaning forward when eating, yet still be able to get past the fixed armrests: the double first-class seats had a centre armrest, which the double third-class seats lacked. There was one toilet in each coach, except the open first which had two. The two restaurant cars each had an attendant's compartment, kitchen (with electric cooking) and pantry; the toilet in these cars was for staff use only. The pantry included a buffet counter, and the third-class pantry was slightly smaller than that of the first-class. Three of the six carriages (those to Diagrams 237, 238 and 239) were unique, and the two brake thirds were the only ones built to Diagram 240. Only in the case of Diagram 236 were other carriages built to the same design: nos. 658 and 678 (1943 nos. 9185 and 9171) were built against Lot no. 780 Doncaster 1937-38, for use on other long-distance services on the Great Eastern section, such as Harwich-Liverpool. No. 677 was later declassified to Restaurant Kitchen Third, Diagram 264 (as was no. 658).

== The service ==
The train was inaugurated in Autumn 1937. It ran on Mondays to Fridays only, between Liverpool Street and Norwich, calling only at Ipswich. It was originally allowed 135 minutes for the 115 miles (185 km) (an overall average of just over 51 mph or 82 km/h); this was later reduced to 130 minutes (53 mph or 85 km/h). There were two factors which limited the peak speeds: the general speed restriction on the Norwich line of 80 mph (130 km/h), and the need to fit in with other services using the same tracks, particularly on the congested stretches west of Colchester (51 1/2 mi or 82.9 km from Liverpool Street) – the quadruple track finished at Shenfield (20 1/4 mi or 32.6 km). The schedules were:

Station	Mileage		1937	1938
Norwich Thorpe	0	dep	11:55	12:00
Ipswich	46.2	arr	12:46	12:48
		dep	12:50	12:50
London Liverpool Street	115.1	arr	14:10	14:10
London Liverpool Street	0	dep	18:40	18:40
Ipswich	68.9	arr	20:00	20:00
		dep	20:04	20:02
Norwich Thorpe	115.1	arr	20:55	20:50

The 46.2 miles (74.4 km) from Norwich to Ipswich was originally covered in 51 minutes, an average speed of 54.5 miles per hour (87.7 km/h). The 68.9 miles (110.9 km) from Ipswich to Liverpool Street was originally covered in 80 minutes, an average speed of 51.5 miles per hour (82.9 km/h). In 1938, the Norwich–Ipswich stage was accelerated, and was now run in 48 minutes, giving an average speed for that stretch of 57.5 miles per hour (92.5 km/h).

== Later years ==
Of the various high-speed services operated by the LNER, the East Anglian was the least profitable. The East Anglian service was withdrawn at the outbreak of war and the carriages were returned to the general service fleet, being used for other express trains on the Great Eastern section. The service resumed again on 7 October 1946, using the six 1937 carriages (overhauled) plus a further two all-third coaches to make an eight-carriage train, but was now hauled by Class B1 4-6-0s.

The East Anglian service continued after the reorganisation of East Anglian services in 1951, but with only a single restaurant car. The Gresley coaches were subsequently replaced by BR Mark 1s.

=== Reintroduction ===
In 1980, British Rail reinstated the name The East Anglian for the "premier" service between Norwich and London the service using Air Conditioned Mark 2 coaches and hauled by a Class 47. In 1986, this service ran Monday - Friday only departing from Norwich 07:55 and returning from Liverpool Street station at 16:50, the train in each direction taking 1 hour and 58 minutes.
