= LNER B17 Class 61673 Spirit of Sandringham =

LNER 61673 Spirit of Sandringham
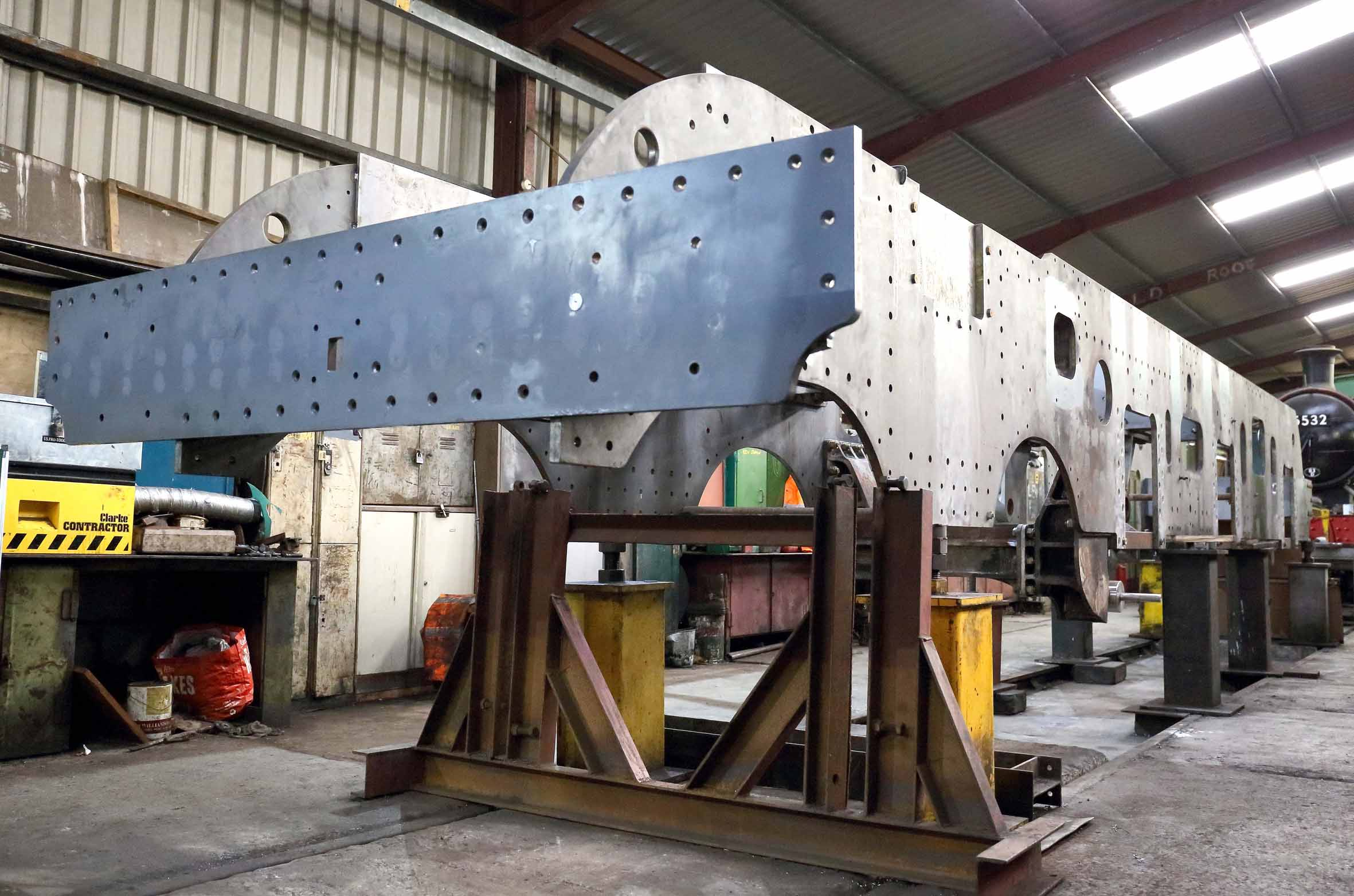
- 61673 'Spirit of Sandringham's mainframe at the Llangollen Railway complete, 24/02/2019.
Type and origin
- Power type: Steam
- Designer: Nigel Gresley (original designer)
- Builder: B17 Steam Locomotive Trust
Specifications
- Configuration
  - Whyte: 4-6-0
- Gauge: 4 ft 8 1/2 in (1,435 mm) standard gauge
- Leading dia.: 3 ft 2 in (0.965 m)
- Driver dia.: 6 ft 8 in (2.032 m)
- Length: 62 ft 2 in (18.95 m)
- Loco weight: 77.25–80.5 long tons (78.49–81.79 t; 86.52–90.16 short tons)
- Fuel type: Coal
- Boiler pressure: 225 psi (1.55 MPa)
- Cylinders: Three
- Cylinder size: 17 1/2 in × 26 in (444 mm × 660 mm)
- Valve gear: Outside: Walschaerts; Inside: Gresley conjugated
- Valve type: 8-inch (203 mm) piston valves
- Train heating: Steam Heat
- Loco brake: Vacuum + Air
Performance figures
- Maximum speed: 75mph
- Tractive effort: 28,553 lbf (127.0 kN)
Career
- Power class: 6P5F
- Axle load class: BR: Route Availability 5
- Disposition: Under Construction

61673 "Spirit of Sandringham" is an LNER B17 class 4-6-0 steam locomotive which is being built by the B17 Steam Locomotive Trust. No original Gresley B17 Class locomotives were preserved, so Spirit of Sandringham is being built as the next member of its class, similarly to 60163 Tornado.

Construction of 61673 started at the workshops of the Llangollen Railway, but with the closure of the latter's engineering business in 2020, the completed mainframes were moved to the workshops of CTL Seal LTD in Sheffield in October 2020.

Spirit of Sandringham will be completed to mainline standards, being capable of hauling railtours on the UK national network and available to visit heritage railways.

== Background ==
The original B17s were built from 1928 to 1937 with the construction of the seventy-three engines being split between :- North British Locomotive Company, Darlington Works & Robert Stephenson and Company.

By 1960, withdrawal of the class was well underway with only seventeen remaining in service at the start of the year. The final original B17 to be withdrawn was No.61668 Bradford City, which was withdrawn in August 1960 and cut up not long after.

The longest working life of a B17 was 31 years by No.61608 Gunton & the shortest being 21 years for No.61667 Bradford.

It was announced in Steam Railway magazine issue 349, on 1 May 2008 that a group planned to build two B17s (one being a replica of 61662 "Manchester United" while the other would be numbered 61673 and given the name "Spirit of Sandringham").

No. 61673's construction was first being undertaken in Llangollen by the B17 Steam Locomotive Trust while the replica engine was being built at a private site by the 61662 appeal. In November 2020 it was announced that the 61662 project was being terminated.

With the cessation of the Llangollen Railway's engineering business in 2020, the frames of 61673 were moved to CTL Seal LTD in Sheffield in October 2020, for construction to continue.

== Project milestones ==
- April 2015: Frames rolled at Tata Steel.
- September 2015: Completed frames delivered to Llangollen.
