= The Coronation (train) =

United Kingdom passenger train service

The Coronation was a streamlined express passenger train run by the London and North Eastern Railway between London King's Cross and Edinburgh Waverley. Named to mark the coronation of King George VI and Queen Elizabeth, it was inaugurated on 5 July 1937. The down train (northbound) left London at 4 pm and arrived in Edinburgh at 10 pm; the up train (southbound) ran half an hour later.

== Design ==
The design was based on the very successful streamlined train, The Silver Jubilee, built in 1935, but instead of being painted silver and grey, it was given a two-tone blue livery, garter blue on the lower panels and the lighter Marlborough blue above. The colours were chosen from a group sponsored by the British Colour Council for the coronation of King George VI. Internally, it was decorated in the Art Deco style.

== Formation ==
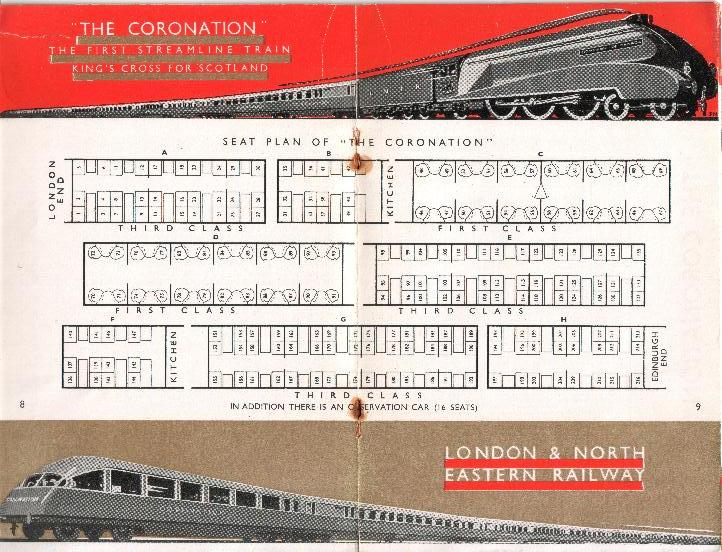
Seating plan of LNER Coronation train

The train was formed of four two-car articulated units, with a 'beaver-tail' observation car added in summer, marshalled as follows on a southbound service from Edinburgh to London, the northbound service from London to Edinburgh would be marshalled the opposite way round with the Locomotive and coal tender, and observation car being coupled to the opposite ends (see image right).

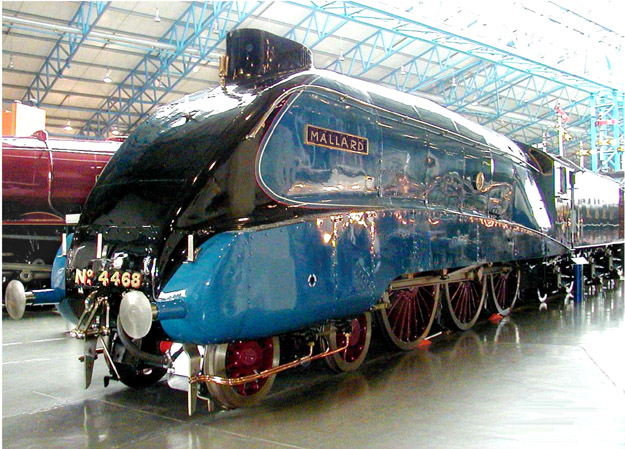
A4 Pacific no. 4468 Mallard in the garter blue livery originally reserved for locomotives that hauled The Coronation

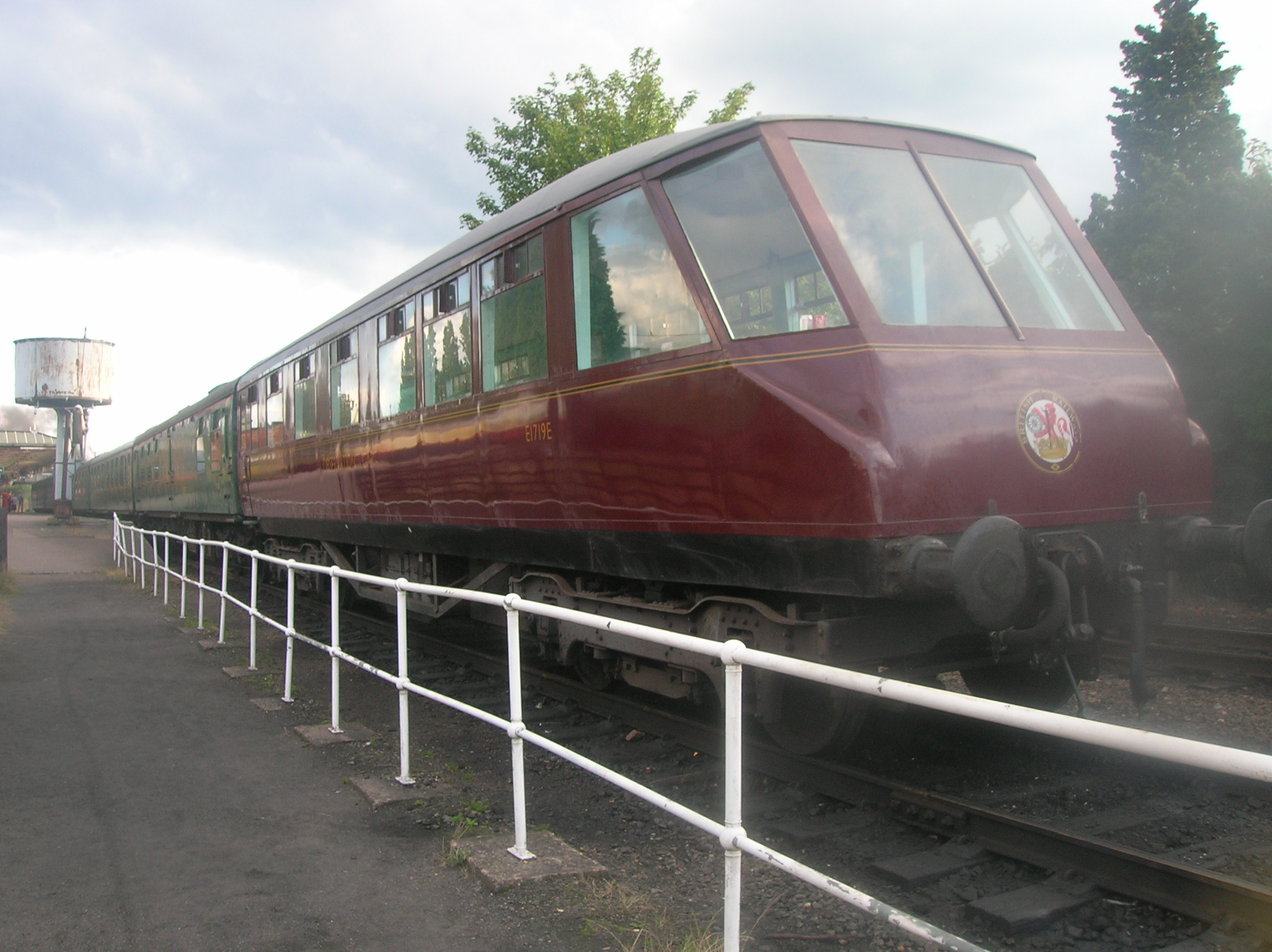
One of the 'beaver-tail' observation cars used on The Coronation, in rebuilt form at the Great Central Railway

- Locomotive and tender
- Brake Third + Kitchen Third: 42 seats
- Open First + Open First: 48 seats
- Open Third + Kitchen Third: 36 seats
- Open Third + Brake Third: 66 seats
- Observation car: 16 seats

26 coaches were built – three of each type of articulated pair plus two observation cars, sufficient to form three eight-coach trains. Two of these, with the observation cars, were for use on the Coronation and lettered accordingly; the third was spare, used for maintenance cover on both the Coronation and the West Riding Limited, which used an almost-identical eight-coach train but lacked the observation car.

The train was usually hauled by a streamlined LNER Class A4 'Pacific' locomotive, in a special garter blue livery with red wheels. From October 1937, this became the standard livery of the class.

The observation cars had a distinctive 'beaver tail' shape. They ran in this form until the Second World War when the train's coaches were put in store. In 1948, various vehicles returned to service as general passenger stock, but they never ran as a full set again - the observation cars were transferred to the West Highland line in 1956. Their original observation end was found to give limited views, so British Railways rebuilt them with a more angled end and added larger windows, running in this form from 1959 to 1968. Both the observation cars have survived and are being restored by Railway Vehicle Preservations Ltd., which has restored one to its original condition, the other as rebuilt.

== See also ==
- Coaches of the London and North Eastern Railway
- East Anglian
