= Colchester Carriage Servicing Depot =

Railway maintenance depot in Colchester, Essex

- Interactive map of Colchester Carriage Servicing Depot

Location
- Location: Colchester, Essex
- Coordinates: 51.9021°N 0.8871°E
- OS grid: TL987265

Characteristics
- Owner: Greater Anglia
- Depot code: CR (1973–present)
- Type: DMU, EMU

History
- Former depot code: 30E (1948 – May 1973)

Colchester engine shed was a motive power depot located in Colchester in the county of Essex in the UK. The original depot dated back to the opening of the Eastern Counties Railway (ECR) in 1843 and a second engine shed was built following the opening of the Eastern Union Railway in 1846. The ECR shed closed and the EUR shed was in use until November 1959 when the line was electrified and Colchester station rebuilt. A smaller two track engine shed was provided south of the station and after closure in the 1990s it was used for the stabling of diesel and electrical multiple units. It is currently known as Colchester Carriage Servicing Depot and units can be washed externally and cleaned internally on site.

In 2018 Greater Anglia returned the former two-track shed to operational use and this entry covers both sheds.

== Early days (1839–1862) ==
The Eastern Counties Railway opened a two-track railway on 20 June 1839 from a temporary terminus at Devonshire Street in Mile End, Middlesex, as far as Romford in Essex. The following year this was extended into Shoreditch (later renamed Bishopsgate). The line was extended to Colchester and, on 25 February 1843, a special inspection train left Shoreditch for Colchester. However, the train was stopped at Brentwood as a timber viaduct at Mountnessing had subsided and it was unsafe to continue. On 7 March 1843 goods trains started operation followed by the commencement of passenger services on 29 March.

An ECR engine shed was established in the area to the west of the station. The Eastern Union Railway (EUR) arrived in 1846 and they also established an engine shed, this time to the east of the ECR station which they shared. The early history of this structure was unhappy in that a fire on 25 January 1850 destroyed the engine house and three locomotives.

The ECR took over operations of the EUR and the former EUR engine shed became the sole engine shed at Colchester from 1854.

By the 1860s the railways in East Anglia were in financial trouble and most were leased to the Eastern Counties Railway (ECR). Although they wished to amalgamate formally, they could not obtain government agreement for this until 1862, when the Great Eastern Railway (GER) was formed by the amalgamation.

== Great Eastern Railway (1862–1922) ==
Under Great Eastern Railway (GER) organisation Colchester shed fell under the Ipswich engine shed area. At this time it had the code COL.

In 1866 GER minutes recorded problems with the water supply and agreement was reached with the Colchester Waterworks Company to meet increased demand. The original turntable was in need of replacement and the GER sanctioned a new 45 foot table in March 1869.

The shed site was on a very restricted site north of Colchester railway station and west of the Great Eastern Main Line. The shed itself consisted of a single track shed with a turntable located to the south. The shed could only hold three locomotives and the locomotive superintendent made suggestions for expanding facilities and ensuring locomotives were not inadvertently left on the main line.

In 1877 the shed site was able to hold eight locomotives although further improvements were sanctioned.

Twelve years later in June 1889 a report suggested increasing the accommodation by nine further engines. The contract was awarded in August 1890 and a new three road brick shed with a slated north light roof was built. The original shed road became a through road whilst the other two were dead end sidings. In 1891 further improvements were also made to the water supply.

During World War I the turntable was replaced by a 65 foot model suitable for the longer more powerful locomotives operating in the area. The depot site was increased with additional siding space to enable locomotives that would have been stabled in coastal areas to be stabled inland (to avoid coastal bombardment).

Until 1920 maintenance was either carried out in the open, a lean to or a converted box wagon. A new maintenance area was provided in that year.

== London & North Eastern Railway (1923–1947) ==
Following the Railways Act 1921 the NER amalgamated with other railways to create the London and North Eastern Railway (LNER) on 1 January 1923. The table below shows the allocated locomotives on that date – all locomotives were of GER origin. The table also shows the allocation 24 years later shortly before nationalisation.

Class (LNER classification)	Wheel Arrangement	Number allocated 1923	Number allocated 1947	Remarks
D13	4-4-0	7	0	All withdrawn by 1943
D14	4-4-0	2	0	Class rebuilt as D16 in 1920s/1930s
D15	4-4-0	4	0	Class rebuilt as D16 in 1920s/1930s
E4	2-4-0	1	0	Although these continued to work the Stour Valley line via Long Melford and Haverhill and were seen at Colchester the class was allocated to Cambridge, Bury St Edmunds and Norwich engine sheds
F3	2-4-2T	4	0	
F4	2-4-2T	2	0	
F5	2-4-2T	1	5	
F7	2-4-2T	2	0	Only two remained in service both allocated to St Margaret's shed in Edinburgh.
J14	0-6-0	5	0	All withdrawn by end of LNER in 1947
J15	0-6-0	14	13	Predominantly local freight locomotives
J66	0-6-0T	1	1	
J67	0-6-0T	2	1	
J69	0-6-0T	1	1	
Y5	0-4-0T	1	0	Withdrawn by 1931.
B12	4-6-0	0	3	Main line engines
D16/3	4-4-0	0	7	
K2	2-6-0	0	2	LNE design
J70	0-6-0	0	1	Tram engine

In 1933 the LNER modernised the shed although no effort was made to increase the restricted nature of the site. Up to this point coaling locomotives had been carried out from a low bank or from a wagon in an adjacent road. The LNER installed a lightweight tub elevator to improve this as well as extending the ash pits (where ash was dumped when locomotives arrived on the shed). The shed building was rebuilt at this point into a brick structure with a stepped roof although this was still a three track affair with one through road and two dead end roads.

However the site was still far too small and in December 1932 Colchester had an allocation of 61 locomotives. However it did have a number of sub-sheds so many locomotives were actually running from those sheds although allocated to Colchester. The depot was employing around 70 people at this time with a similar number employed at the sub-sheds. Colchester's sub sheds were in 1932:

- Kelvedon
- Maldon
- Witham
- Braintree
- Brightlingsea
- Clacton
- Walton on Naze
- Sudbury
- Haverhill
- Halstead

During World War II a number of USA 2-8-0 locomotives were allocated to Colchester before the invasion of the continent.

== British Railways (1948–1996) ==
Following nationalisation the shed became part of the Eastern Region of British Railways, and under the British Railways shed numbering scheme, Colchester was allocated the code 30E. By this time it was no longer part of the Ipswich district but part of the Stratford district.

The modernisation of the Great Eastern Main Line saw Colchester lose its main line allocation and Ipswich and Stratford engine sheds were then the nearest sheds with a main line allocation. Towards the end of its life diesel locomotives were being fuelled from tank wagons on the depot site. The old depot closed on 2 November 1959.

The new electric multiple units were maintained at Clacton and Ilford and sidings south of the rebuilt station electrified sidings were provided for overnight stabling of commuter stock. A new two track modern depot was built and retained an allocation of shunting locomotives and following the closure of Ipswich and Parkeston engine sheds the shunting locomotives from these depots were allocated to Colchester for maintenance purposes although spending most time out based at those locations. During the 1970s and 1980s the allocation consisted of Class 03, Class 04 and Class 08 locomotives. The class 04s disappeared in the early 1970s but Class 03s which worked the Ipswich Dock lines were retained until the 1980s before the depot became all Class 08.

With the introduction of the British Rail TOPS (Total Operations Planning System) in 1973, Colchester locomotives were allocated the code CR. Gradually as traffic declined and trains were operated in block loads and shunted by their own locomotives the allocation reduced and eventually the depot closed to traffic in the 1990s although visiting locomotives continued to stable in the depot area.

== The privatisation era (1996–present) ==
As of 2016, the Colchester Carriage Servicing Depot has no allocation. It was at this time a stabling point for Greater Anglia Class 153/156 Sprinters, Class 170 Turbostars, Class 321 and Class 360 EMUs.

The two road shed was unused for a number of years although the lines through the depot were intact and used for stabling local DMUs or Thunderbird rescue locomotives.

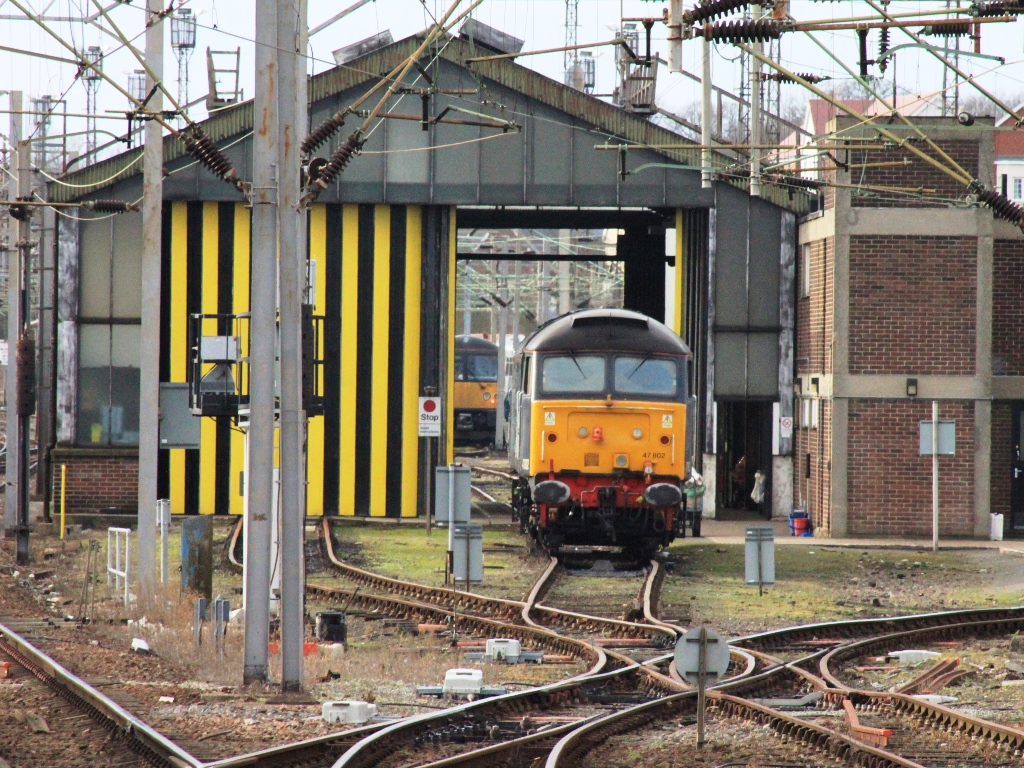
Colchester – DRS 47802

During late 2018 Greater Anglia refurbished the shed and it was used to service local DMUs that work on the Sudbury branch and DMU worked services from Ipswich. This was to relieve the pressure on Norwich Crown Point depot which was working to accept new electric and bi-mode units into service. With these trains entering service in 2020 it is unclear whether the shed will be retained for this local maintenance role.
