= LNER Thompson Class B2 =

Class of British steam locomotives

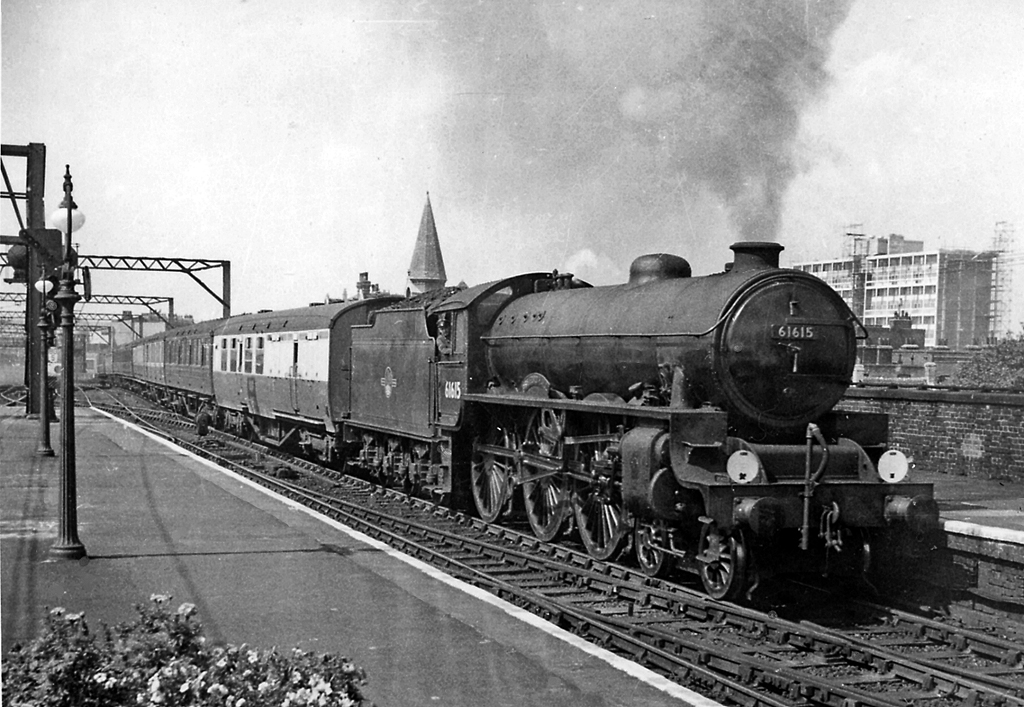
- A B2 Class at Bethnal Green
Type and origin
- Power type: Steam
- Designer: Edward Thompson
- Build date: 1928–1937 (as class B17)
- Rebuilder: Doncaster Works
- Rebuild date: 1945–1949
- Number rebuilt: 10
Specifications
- Configuration
  - Whyte: 4-6-0
  - UIC: 2′C h2
- Gauge: 4 ft 8 1/2 in (1,435 mm)
- Leading dia.: 3 ft 2 in (0.965 m)
- Driver dia.: 6 ft 8 in (2.032 m)
- Wheelbase: Loco: 28 ft 2 in (8.59 m)
- Axle load: Full: 18 long tons 12 cwt (41,700 lb or 18.9 t)
- Adhesive weight: Full: 54 long tons 14 cwt (122,500 lb or 55.6 t)
- Loco weight: Full: 73 long tons 10 cwt (164,600 lb or 74.7 t)
- Fuel type: Coal
- Firebox
  - Grate area: 27.9 sq ft (2.59 m^{2})
- Boiler: Diagram 100A
- Boiler pressure: 225 psi (1.55 MPa)
- Heating surface
  - Firebox: 168 sq ft (15.6 m^{2})
  - Tubes: 1,033 sq ft (96.0 m^{2})
  - Flues: 460 sq ft (43 m^{2})
- Superheater
  - Heating area: 344 sq ft (32.0 m^{2})
- Cylinders: Two, outside
- Cylinder size: 20 in × 26 in (510 mm × 660 mm)
- Valve gear: Walschaerts
- Valve type: 10-inch (250 mm) piston valves
Performance figures
- Tractive effort: 24,863 lbf (110.60 kN)
Career
- Operators: LNER » BR
- Class: B2
- Power class: LNER: load class 4 BR: 4P; 5P from May 1953
- Axle load class: Route availability: 5
- Locale: East Coast Main Line
- Withdrawn: 1958–1959
- Disposition: All scrapped

The London and North Eastern Railway (LNER) Thompson Class B2 was a class of 4-6-0 steam locomotive. It was introduced in 1945 as a two-cylinder rebuild (with diagram 100A boiler) of the three-cylinder LNER Class B17. Ten were rebuilt from Class B17 but no more were rebuilt because of the success of the LNER Thompson Class B1.

== Numbering ==
The LNER renumbered its locomotive stock during the period that these locomotives were being rebuilt, so some were renumbered at the time that they were rebuilt, some before rebuilding, and some after rebuilding. The renumbering plan for class B2 was the same as for class B17: in each case the first two digits were altered from 28 to 16. Thus 2803 became 1603 at rebuilding in October 1946; 2807 had already become 1607 (December 1946) prior to rebuilding in May 1947; and 2814 (rebuilt November 1946) became 1614 in December 1946. Between 1948 and 1950, British Railways increased these numbers by 60000; no. 61644 was so renumbered at the time of its rebuilding in March 1949.

== Names ==
The rebuilt locomotives kept their names:

- 2803 ((6)1603) Framlingham
- 2807 ((6)1607) Blickling
- 2814 ((6)1614) Castle Hedingham
- 2815 ((6)1615) Culford Hall
- 2816 ((6)1616) Fallodon
- 2817 ((6)1617) Ford Castle
- 2832 ((6)1632) Belvoir Castle
- 2839 ((6)1639) Norwich City
- 2844 ((6)1644) Earlham Hall
- 2871 ((6)1671) Manchester City

=== Renaming ===
Two of the locomotives were renamed. No. 1671 was the official Royal engine and for this purpose it was renamed Royal Sovereign in April 1946.

The second renaming occurred after the withdrawal of 61671 in September 1958: in October, the name Royal Sovereign was transferred to no. 61632, which then became the official Royal engine. All members of the class were scrapped.

== Operation ==
Two B2s were kept at Cambridge for hauling the Royal Train in East Anglia, predominantly to and from Wolferton which was the nearest to Sandringham House, these being renamed Royal Sovereign and 61617 Ford Castle as the reserve. There were three sets of drivers and firemen allocated specifically to work the "Royal" engines and they did not work unless operated by one of these teams. It was Ford Castle which was one of the locomotives used to haul the funeral train of King George VI on 11 February 1952, hauling the train from Wolferton as far as King's Lynn from where 70000 Britannia took over for the rest of the journey to King's Cross.

Other than the two locomotives allocated to Cambridge, the remaining locomotives were mainly allocated to Colchester and were predominantly used on services between Liverpool Street and Clacton. Many publications list "B17/B2" together and consider the types interchangeable which may lead to the type being overlooked; a list of locomotives allocated to Colchester in 1951 and labelled as "B2/B17" shows eight B2s and no B17s.

Due to the size of the turntables on the Great Eastern section, locomotives were sometimes used with tenders that were shorter than those originally designed. At least one B2 was recorded as being paired with a tender of NER origin rather than the longer B17 tender.

The last B2 was withdrawn in 1959.
