= List of named passenger trains of the United Kingdom =

This article contains lists of named passenger trains in the United Kingdom. These are specific regular journeys identified by a special name in the timetable, not to be confused with the names of engines or individual physical train rakes. One-off charter and sporadic special trains are not included.

List
Train name	Company/ies	Journey endpoints	Dates operated
21st Century Limited	Grand Central	London King's Cross – Sunderland (one way only)	2008 – 2010
Aberdonian	BR; Serco	Aberdeen – London King's Cross (sleeper service - later Night Aberdonian)	1927 – ?2012; Jan – Mar 2016
Aberdonian	BR	Aberdeen – London King's Cross (daytime InterCity 125 service)	?1977 – 1994
Admiraal de Ruijter	BR / NS	London Liverpool Street – Harwich Parkeston Quay – ferry – Hoek van Holland Haven – Amsterdam Centraal	1987 – 1989
Antwerp Continental (boat train)	LNER	London Liverpool Street – Harwich Parkeston Quay – Harwich Town	? – 1954
Armada	GWR	London Paddington – Plymouth	? – present
Atlantic Coast Express	SR / BR	London Waterloo – Plymouth, Ilfracombe, Sidmouth, Exmouth, Bude, Padstow, Torrington	1926 – 1948 – 1964
Atlantic Coast Express	GWR	London Paddington – Newquay	2008 – present
Belfast Boat Express (boat train)	BR	Manchester Victoria – Heysham and Morecambe	? – 1960 – 1975
Benjamin Britten	BR / NS	London Liverpool Street – Harwich Parkeston Quay– ferry – Hoek van Holland Haven – Amsterdam Centraal	1987 – 1989
Birmingham Pullman (Note: One of the Blue Pullman trains.)	BR	London Paddington – Wolverhampton Low Level	1960 – 1966
Bon Accord	BR	Aberdeen – Glasgow Buchanan Street	1949 – 1968
Bournemouth Belle (Pullman train)	SR / BR	London Waterloo – Bournemouth Central/Bournemouth West	1931 – 1967
Brighton Belle (Pullman train)	SR / BR	London Victoria – Brighton	1934 – 1972
Brighton Limited (Pullman train)	LBSCR	London Victoria – Brighton	1887 – 1908
Brighton Pullman Limited (Pullman train)	LBSCR	London Victoria – Brighton	1898 – 1908
Bristol Pullman (Pullman train)	BR	London Paddington – Bristol Temple Meads	1960 – 1973
Bristolian	GWR (original) / BR / GWR	London Paddington – Bristol Temple Meads non-stop (original); London Paddington to Weston-super-Mare (current)	1935 – present
Broadsman	BR	London Liverpool Street – Cromer and Sheringham	1950 – 1962
Caledonian	BR / Virgin	Glasgow Central – London Euston	1957 – 1964 ? – 2005
Caledonian Sleeper (night train)	InterCity West Coast / ScotRail (British Rail) / ScotRail (National Express) / First ScotRail / Caledonian Sleeper	London Euston – Edinburgh Waverley; London Euston – Aberdeen; London Euston – Fort William; London Euston – Glasgow Central; London Euston – Inverness	1996 – present
Cambrian Coast Express	GWR (original) / BR	London Paddington (later London Euston) – Aberystwyth; London Paddington – Pwllheli	1927 – 1991
Capitals Limited	BR	London King's Cross – Aberdeen (non-stop London King's Cross to Edinburgh Waverley)	1949 – 1952 (succeeded by Elizabethan)
Capitals United Express	BR	London Paddington – Cardiff Central; London Paddington – Fishguard Harbour	1956 – 1963
Capitals United	GWR	London Paddington – Swansea	2010 – present
Carmarthen Bay Express	GWR	London Paddington – Tenby	1927 – ????
Carolean Express	LNER	London King's Cross – Edinburgh Waverley	May 2023 – present
Cathedrals Express	BR / GWR	London Paddington – Oxford – Hereford	1957 – present
Cheltenham Spa Express (also known as The Cheltenham Flyer)	GWR (original) / BR / GWR	London Paddington – Cheltenham Spa	1929 – present
Clansman	BR	Inverness – London Euston via Birmingham New Street	1974 – 1984
Comet	BR	London Euston – Manchester London Road	1949 – 1962
Cornish Riviera Express	GWR (original) / BR / GWR	London Paddington – Penzance	1904 – present
Cornish Scot	BR / Virgin CrossCountry	Glasgow Central – Penzance	1987 – 2002
Cornishman	GWR (original)	London Paddington – Penzance	1890 – 1904; 1935 – 1936
Cornishman	BR	(Bradford Exchange) – Wolverhampton Low Level – Penzance and Kingswear	1951 – 1975
Cornishman	BR	Edinburgh Waverley – Penzance	1983 – 2002
Cornishman	GWR	London Paddington – Penzance	2006 – present
Coronation	LNER	London King's Cross – Edinburgh Waverley	1937 – 1939
Coronation Scot	LMS	Glasgow Central – London Euston	1937 – 1939
Cotswolds and Malvern Express	GWR (original) / BR / Wales & West / GWR	Bristol Temple Meads – Great Malvern; London Paddington – Hereford	May 1884 – May 1997; June 2024 – present
Day Continental (boat train)	LNER / BR	London Liverpool Street – Harwich Parkeston Quay	1946 – 1987 (succeeded by Benjamin Britten)
Devon Belle (Pullman train)	SR / BR	London Waterloo – Ilfracombe; London Waterloo – Plymouth	1947 – 1954
Devon Express	GWR	London Paddington – Paignton	? – present
Devon Scot	BR / Virgin CrossCountry	Aberdeen – Carlisle – Plymouth	1988 – 2002
Devonian	LMS / BR	Bradford Forster Square (Bradford Exchange from 1967; Leeds from 1980) – Sheffield Midland – Bristol Temple Meads (winter) – Paignton (summer)	1927 – 2002
Dorset Scot	BR / Virgin CrossCountry	Poole – Newcastle – Edinburgh Waverley	1990 – 2002
East Anglian	LNER / BR / Anglia / National Express East Anglia / Abellio Greater Anglia	London Liverpool Street – Norwich	1937–present
The Easterling	BR	London Liverpool Street – Lowestoft and Yarmouth South Town	1950 – 1958
The Elizabethan (summer only)	BR	London King's Cross – Edinburgh Waverley (non-stop) (Note: Advertised as non-stop in summer 1962 but stopped for crew change at Newcastle after introduction of Deltic traction.)	1953 – 1964
Emerald Isle Express	BR	London Euston – Llandudno and Holyhead	1954 – 1960 – 1975; 1993 – 1997
Enterprise	GNR(I) / UTA+CIÉ / NIR+IÉ	Belfast Grand Central (Belfast Great Victoria Street from 1947 to 1976, Belfast Central from 1976 to 2018, and Belfast Lanyon Place from 2018 to 2024) & Dublin Connolly	1947–present
Essex Coast Express	BR	London Liverpool Street – Clacton	1958 – 1968
The European	BR	Edinburgh Waverley and Glasgow Central – Harwich Parkeston Quay	1983 – 1988
Fair Maid	BR	London King's Cross – Perth	1957 – 1958 (succeeded by Morning Talisman)
Fenman	BR	London Liverpool Street – Hunstanton; after 1969 to King's Lynn	1949 – 1968
Fife Coast Express (Ran as Fifeshire Coast Express 1912 – 1924)	NBR / LNER / BR	St Andrews – Glasgow Queen Street	1948 – 1959
Flying Dutchman	GWR (original)+BER	London Paddington – Exeter St Davids	1849 – 1892
Flying Scotsman	GNR+NER+NBR / LNER / BR / GNER / NXEC / East Coast / VTEC / LNER	London King's Cross – Edinburgh Waverley; From May 2011: Edinburgh to London, one way only	1862 – present
Flying Carolean	GWR	London Paddington – Swansea	2023 – present
Golden Arrow (boat train)	SR / BR	London Victoria – Dover Priory or Folkestone Harbour	1929 – 1972
Golden Hind	BR / GWR	London Paddington – Penzance	1964 – present
Granite City	? / BR	Aberdeen – Glasgow Buchanan Street	1933 – 1939; 1948 –
Harrogate Pullman	LNER	London King's Cross – Harrogate and Newcastle	1923 – 1928 (Succeeded by the West Riding Pullman)
Harrogate Sunday Pullman	BR	London King's Cross – Harrogate and Bradford Exchange	1950s – late 1960s
Heart of Midlothian	BR	London King's Cross – Edinburgh Waverley	1951 – 1968
The Hebridean	LMS / BR	Inverness – Kyle of Lochalsh	1933 – ???? 1965 – ????
Highland Chieftain	GNER / VTEC /LNER	Inverness – London King's Cross	1984–present
Highlandman	LNER	Fort William Perth Inverness – London King's Cross	1927 – 1939
Highwayman	BR	Finsbury Park – Newcastle via Sunderland	1970 – 1971
Hook Continental (boat train)	LNER / BR	London Liverpool Street – Harwich Parkeston Quay	1927 – 1939; 1945 – 1987 (Succeeded by Admiraal de Ruijter)
Hull Executive	BR / GNER / NXEC / East Coast / VTEC	Hull – London King's Cross	1978–2015
Inter-City	BR	London Paddington – Wolverhampton Low Level	1950–1965
Irish Mail (boat train)	LNWR / LMS / BR / Virgin	London Euston – Holyhead	1849 – 1985, 1990s – 2002
Irishman (boat train)	BR	Glasgow St Enoch – Stranraer	1951 ?
John O'Groat	LMS	Inverness – – Wick	1936 – 39
Kentish Belle (Pullman train) formerly the Thanet Belle	BR	London – – Margate, Broadstairs and Ramsgate	1951 – 58
Lakes Express	LMS / BR	London Euston – Windermere, Keswick, Workington	1927 – 1939; 1945 – 1965
Lancastrian	LMS / BR	Manchester London Road – London Euston	1928 – 1939; 1957 – 1962
The Lewisman	LMS	Inverness – Kyle of Lochalsh	1933 – 1939
Liverpool Pullman	BR	Liverpool Lime Street – London Euston	1966 – 1974
Loreley (boat train)	BR	Blackpool North – Manchester Piccadilly – Nottingham – Harwich Parkeston Quay	1988 – 1992
Man of Kent	BR	London Charing Cross – Dover, Deal, Sandwich and Margate	1953 – 1961
Manchester Pullman	BR / Virgin	Manchester Piccadilly – London Euston	1966 – 1990s
Mancunian	LMS / BR	Manchester London Road – London Euston	1927 – 1966
The Manxman	LMS / BR	Liverpool Lime Street – London Euston	1927 – 1966
Master Cutler	LNER / BR / MML / EMR	Sheffield Victoria – London Marylebone; after 1958 to London King's Cross, later to St Pancras; after privatisation from Leeds to London St Pancras via Sheffield. From 2008 no longer from Leeds but again starting at Sheffield.	1947 – 2025
Mayflower	BR / GWR	Kingswear and Plymouth – London Paddington	1957 – present
The Merchant Venturer	BR / GWR	London Paddington – Bristol Temple Meads and Weston-super-Mare	1951 – present
Merseyside Express	BR	London Euston – Liverpool Lime Street	1949 – 1966
Midland Pullman	BR	Manchester Central – London St Pancras with midday infill London St Pancras – Nottingham	1960–1966
Mid-Day Scot	LMS / BR	Glasgow Central – London Euston	1927 – 1965
Midlands Express	BR / MML	Sheffield – London St Pancras	1999 – 2008
Night Ferry	SR / BR	London Victoria – Paris Nord) later also to Brussels (Midi/Zuid) after 1948 also second-class coaches as far as Dover Western Docks	1936 – 1980
Night Riviera	GWR	London Paddington – Penzance	19th century – present
Night Scot	LNWR / BR	London Euston – Glasgow Central (sleeper train)	From inauguration in 1927 it ran to Aberdeen, but this was soon after changed to Glasgow.
Night Scotsman	LNER / BR	London King's Cross – Edinburgh Waverley (sleeper train)	1930s to transfer of all Scottish sleepers to Euston
Norfolk Coast Express	GER	London Liverpool Street – Cromer	1907 – 1914
The Norfolkman	BR	Sheringham – London Liverpool Street	1947 – 1962; 1993 – 2000
Norseman	BR	London King's Cross – Newcastle Tyne Commission Quay (to connect with Bergen Line or Fred Olsen Line shipping services to Norway).	1947 – 1966
North Briton	BR	Glasgow Queen Street – Leeds	1952 – 1968; 1972 – 1975
Northern Irishman (sleeper train)	BR	London Euston – Stranraer Harbour	1952 – 1966
Northern Lights	GNER / NXEC / VTEC	Aberdeen – London King's Cross	present
The Northumbrian	BR	London King's Cross – Newcastle	1949 – 1964
Orcadian	LMS	Inverness – to Wick	1936 – 1939
Olympic Javelin	Southeastern High Speed	London St Pancras – Ashford International	2012 – present
Palatine	LMS / BR	Manchester Central – London St Pancras	1938 – 1964
Peaks Express	LMS	Manchester Central – London St Pancras	1938–1939
Pembroke Coast Express	BR / GWR	London Paddington – Pembroke Dock	1953 – present
Pines Express	SR and LMS / BR	Manchester London Road (or Manchester Mayfield), Liverpool and Sheffield Midland – Bournemouth West and Poole	1927 – 1967; revived in the 1980s/90s
Premier Service	ATW / TfW	Holyhead – Cardiff Central and return	2008 – present
Pullman Limited Express (Pullman train)	LBSCR	London Victoria – Brighton (via Horsham route)	1881 – 1887
Queen of Scots (Pullman train)	LNER / BR	Glasgow Queen Street – London King's Cross via Harrogate and Leeds Central	1927 – 1939; 1948 – 1978
The Red Dragon	BR / GWR	London Paddington – Carmarthen	1950 – present
The Red Rose	BR	London Euston – Liverpool Lime Street	1951 – 1966
Robin Hood	BR / MML / EMR	Nottingham – London St Pancras	1958 – 2025
Royal Duchy	BR / GWR	London Paddington – Penzance and Kingswear	1957 – present
Royal Highlander (sleeper train)	BR	London Euston – Inverness	1927 – 1996
Royal Scot	LMS / BR / Virgin	Glasgow Central – London Euston	1927 – 1939; 1948 – 2005
Royal Wessex	SR / BR	London Waterloo – Bournemouth Central, Weymouth and Swanage	1951 – 1967
Saint David	GWR	London Paddington – Swansea	present
The Scandinavian	BR	Liverpool Street – Harwich Parkeston Quay	1950
St Mungo	BR	Aberdeen – Glasgow Buchanan Street	1948 – present
Scarborough Flyer	BR	London King's Cross – Scarborough	1927 – 1963
Sheffield Continental	EMR	Sheffield – London St Pancras (one way only)	2008 – 2025
Silver Jubilee	LNER/BR	London King's Cross – Newcastle / Edinburgh Waverley (1977)	1935 – 1939; 1977
South Wales Pullman	BR	London Paddington – Swansea	1955–1966
South Yorkshireman	BR	Bradford Exchange – Sheffield Victoria – London Marylebone	1948–1960
South Yorkshireman	EMR	Sheffield – London St Pancras	2008 – 2025
Southern Belle (Pullman train)	LBSCR / SR	London Victoria – Brighton	1908 – 1934
Sunny South Express	LNWR+LBSCR / LMS+SR	Liverpool Lime Street – Brighton	1905 – 1939
Sussex Scot	BR / Virgin CrossCountry	Brighton – Glasgow Central; Brighton – Edinburgh Waverley	1988 – 2002
Talisman	BR	London King's Cross – Edinburgh Waverley	1956 – 1991
The Tees Thames	BR	London King's Cross – Middlesbrough – Saltburn	1959 – 1961
Tees-Tyne Pullman	BR	London King's Cross – Newcastle	1948 – 2004
Thames-Clyde Express	LMS / BR	Glasgow Central – Carlisle –Leeds – London St Pancras; before 1966 from Glasgow St Enoch	1927 – 1976
Thames Forth Express	LMS	Edinburgh Waverley – Carlisle –Leeds – London St Pancras (Re-introduced in 1957 by BR as Waverley)	1927 – 1939
Thanet Belle (Pullman train) later the Kentish Belle	BR	London – Margate, Broadstairs and Ramsgate	1948 – 1951
Torbay Express	GWR (original) / BR / GWR	London Paddington – Paignton	1923 – present
The Tynesider	BR	London King's Cross – Newcastle Central (sleeper train)	1950 – 1968
Ulster Express	LMS; BR	London Euston – Morecambe and Heysham	1927 – 1975
Venice-Simplon Orient Express	Orient Express	London Victoria – Paris Est – Venice Santa Lucia	1982 – present
Waverley	BR	Edinburgh Waverley – Carlisle – Leeds – London St Pancras (Re-introduction of the LMS service the Thames Forth Express)	1957 – 1968
Welsh Dragon/Draig Gymreig	Virgin	London Euston – Holyhead	2004 – present
Welshman	LMS	London Euston – Holyhead portions for Llandudno, Porthmadog & Pwllheli	
The Wessex Scot	BR / Virgin CrossCountry	Poole – Glasgow Central	1984 – 2002
West Riding Limited	LNER;BR;VTEC;LNER	London King's Cross – Bradford Exchange (Bradford Interchange from 1978; Bradford Forster Square from c.1990)	1937 – present
West Riding Pullman	LNER	London King's Cross – Harrogate and Newcastle	1928 – 1935; (succeeded by the Yorkshire Pullman)
Weymouth Wizard	GWR	Bristol Temple Meads – Weymouth	2014 – 2017
White Rose	BR	Bradford Exchange – Leeds – London St Pancras	1949 – 1967
The William Shakespeare	BR	London Paddington – Stratford-upon-Avon	1951
Y Cymro – The Welshman	GWR	Swansea and London Paddington	2017
Yorkshire Pullman	BR	London King's Cross – Hull, Bradford Exchange and Harrogate	1935 – 1978
Yorkshire Pullman	BR	London King's Cross – Leeds	1985 – 2004
Zephyr	Grand Central	Sunderland – London King's Cross (one way only)	2008 – 2010

The National Railway Museum, York, has a wall in the Great Hall where the headboards of a number of named trains are displayed. These include:

ANGLO-SCOTTISH CAR CARRIER, BRISTOLIAN*, BROADSMAN*, CALEDONIAN*, CAMBRIAN RADIO CRUISE, CAPITALS LIMITED*+, CAPITALS UNITED EXPRESS, CHELTENHAM FLYER, COMET*, CONDOR (a named freight train, derived from CONtainer DOoR-to-Door), CORNISH RIVIERA EXPRESS, CORNISHMAN*, CTAC SCOTTISH TOURS EXPRESS+, CUNARD SPECIAL+, DAY CONTINENTAL*, DEVONIAN*, EAST ANGLIAN*, EMERALD ISLE EXPRESS, EMPRESS VOYAGER+, FAIR MAID*+, FENMAN*, HARROGATE SUNDAY PULLMAN*, HEART OF MIDLOTHIAN*, INTER-CITY*, IRISH MAIL*, LAKES EXPRESS*, LANCASTRIAN*, MANXMAN*+, MASTER CUTLER*, MAYFLOWER*, MERSEYSIDE EXPRESS*+, MID-DAY SCOT*+, MIDLANDER*, NIGHT SCOTSMAN*, NORFOLKMAN*, NORSEMAN*, NORTH BRITON*, NORTH YORKSHIREMAN*, NORTHERN IRISHMAN*+, NORTHUMBRIAN*+, PALATINE*, PEMBROKE COAST EXPRESS+, QUEEN OF SCOTS*, RED DRAGON*, RED ROSE*, ROBIN HOOD*+, ROYAL DUCHY*, ROYAL HIGHLANDER*+, SCARBOROUGH FLIER, SCARBOROUGH FLYER*, SHAMROCK*+, SOUTH WALES PULLMAN*, TEES-THAMES*, THAMES-CLYDE EXPRESS*, TORBAY EXPRESS, ULSTER EXPRESS, WELSH CHIEFTAIN*, WELSHMAN*, WEST RIDING*

* indicates that the name is prefixed by "THE".

+ indicates that more than one version is on display.

See also railwaybritain.co.uk for a description of a number of Boat Trains, some of which are included in the lists above.

== Notes ==
=== Works cited ===
- Allen, Cecil J. (1947). Titled Trains of Great Britain. London: Ian Allan.
- "Bradshaw's British Railways Official Guide No. 1507". London: Henry Blacklock. 4 January 1960.
- "The Titled Trains of Britain - Part 1: 'The Aberdonian' to 'The Norseman'". The Railway Magazine. Horncastle, Lincs: Mortons Media. November 2011. pp. 14–46. ISSN 0033-8923.
- Peel, Dave (2006). Locomotive Headboards. Sutton Publishing. ISBN 0-7509-4462-5.
