= Brighton Belle (disambiguation) =

Brighton Belle (1931-1972) a named train from the UK

Brighton Belle or Brighton belles or variation, may refer to:

- The Brighton Belles (UK) 1993-1994 ITV TV show
- Brighton Belle street mural, a mural in the Brighton railway station
- Brighton Belle (greyhounds), annual dog racing competition in Brighton & Hove
- Brighton Belle (La Bern novel), a 1963 crime novel by Arthur La Bern
- Brighton Belle (Sheridan novel), 2012 mystery novel by Sara Sheridan

== See also ==
- Brighton (disambiguation)
- Belle (disambiguation)
