= Belmond British Pullman =

Private luxury train service

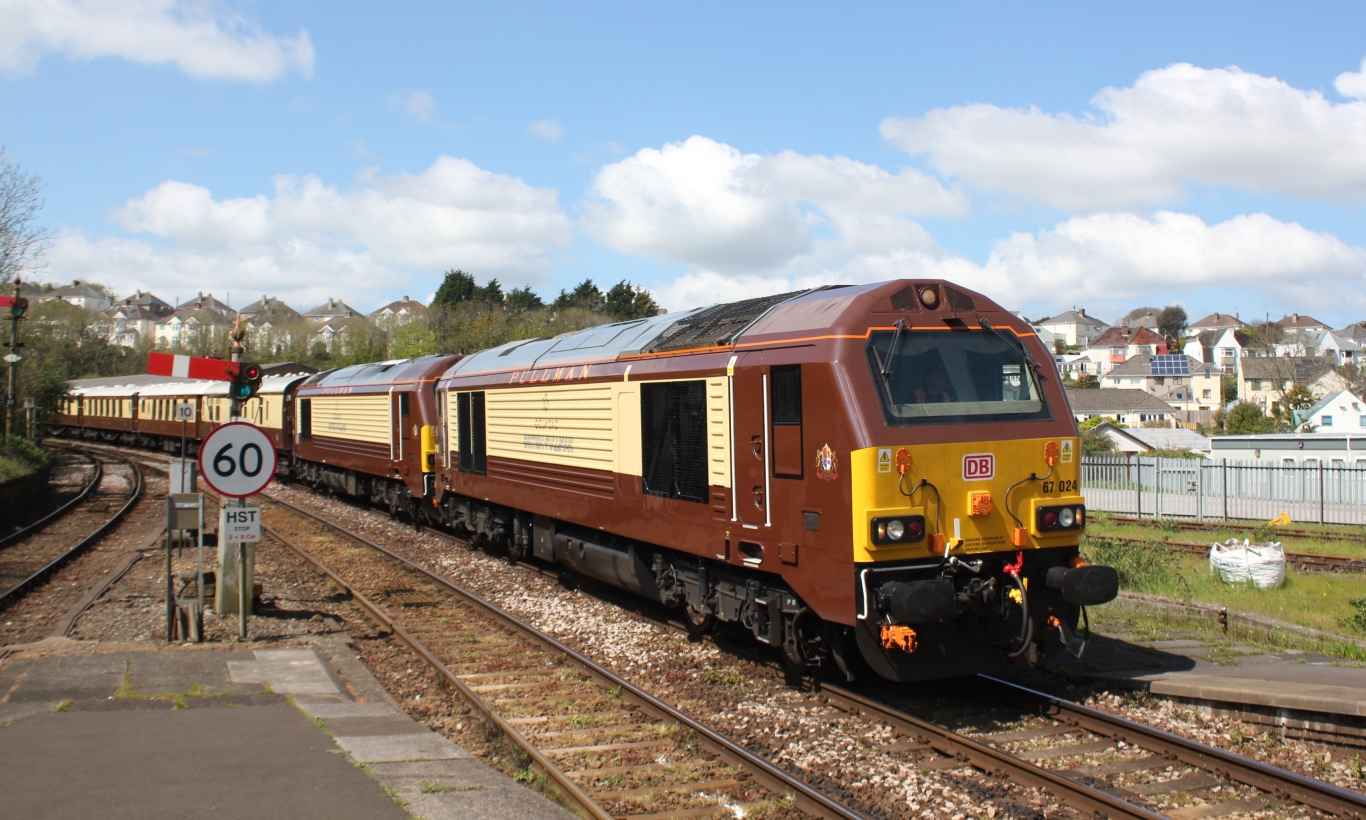

Overview
- Service type: Tourist train
- Status: Operating
- Locale: South of England
- First service: 1982
- Current operator: Belmond Ltd.
- Former operator: Venice Simplon-Orient-Express
- Website: British Pullman

On-board services
- Catering facilities: Fine dining

Technical
- Rolling stock: 11 Pullman cars in service; 7 Pullman cars awaiting restoration; 1 Pullman car on loan; Luggage and staff vans

Belmond British Pullman is a private luxury train that operates day and weekend journeys around Britain. Until 2023, it also served as the British leg of the Venice Simplon-Orient-Express (VSOE) service between London and Venice.

The train service was founded by James Sherwood of Kentucky, USA, in 1982. It is currently owned by Belmond Ltd. Belmond operates 45 luxury hotels, restaurants, tourist trains and river cruises in 24 countries.

Belmond British Pullman journeys operate mainly out of London Victoria station with visits to places of interest in southern Britain such as castles, country houses, cities, sporting occasions and events including the Grand National and Goodwood Revival. There are also weekend journeys to Cornwall, with overnight accommodation in hotels, and non-stop round trips with lunch, afternoon tea and dinner served on board. Elaborate dining is included in every journey.

== Motive power ==
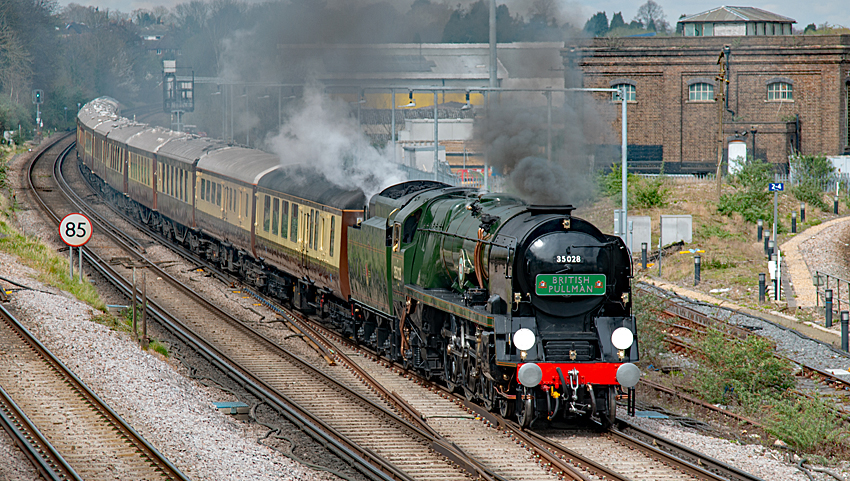
35028 Clan Line hauling the British Pullman at Guildford in 2022

The service is regularly hauled by DB Cargo UK's British Rail Class 67 locomotives, numbers 67021 and 67024, painted in brown and cream to match the carriages. Some excursions have the added attraction of being steam-hauled.

== Carriages ==
Belmond British Pullman consists of Pullman coaches dating from the 1920s to 1950s. They were bought and restored between 1977 and 1982 and modern facilities such as electric heating and toughened glass installed. Original fittings such brass luggage racks were restored and furnishings sympathetic to the period, such as Art deco-style table lamps and armchairs, added. The carriage interiors are lined with wooden panels decorated with marquetry, which were restored by A Dunn and Son, a family firm that dates from 1895 and which created some of the originals. The eleven Pullman carriages can accommodate up to 226 passengers across tables for one, two or three. There are also private compartments for four.

Some of the carriages were part of the former Brighton Belle and were often used to convey royalty. Although the records of the Pullman Car Company were destroyed in a World War II bombing raid, it has been possible to trace the history of the carriages, as detailed on plaques in each one.

There are currently eleven Pullman carriages, which are restored and operational.

Audrey	First class kitchen car, 20 seats, built 1932 by Metropolitan Cammell Carriage and Wagon Co. Ltd. for the Brighton Belle. Damaged 1940 by air raid at Victoria station, repaired and rejoined Brighton Belle in 1947. Carried the Queen, the Queen Mother and the Duke of Edinburgh to review the Fleet in 1953. Transported the Queen on her visit to the University of Sussex, 1964. Acquired from DS Lowther 1980. This is the coach that George Cole and Dennis Waterman travelled in whilst filming Minder on the Orient Express in 1985 . Decoration: marquetry landscape panels and Art Deco strip lights.
Cygnus	First class parlour car, 26 seats, construction commenced 1938 but completion deferred until 1951 due to war. Builders were Birmingham Railway Carriage and Wagon Co. Used in the special Festival of Britain rake in 1951; reserved for use by royalty and visiting heads of state; made the last journey of the Golden Arrow 1972. Acquired from North Yorkshire Moors Railway, 1977. Decoration: Australian walnut panels, mirrors and old prints. It was redesigned in 2021 by Wes Anderson with new marquetries, armchairs and table lamps.
Gwen	First class kitchen car, 20 seats, built 1932 by Metropolitan Cammell Carriage and Wagon Co. Ltd for the Brighton Belle. In 1948 was used, with sister car Mona, to convey Queen Elizabeth (later the Queen Mother) to Brighton. The Brighton Belle service was withdrawn in 1972. Preserved as a restaurant at The Horseless Carriage, Chingford, Essex, and later at the Colne Valley Railway, Castle Hedingham, Essex. Acquired by VSOE in 1988 and joined the British Pullman Train in 1999. Decoration: Pearwood shell motif on English walnut.
Ibis	First class kitchen car, 20 seats, built 1925 by Birmingham Railway Carriage & Wagon Co. Sold to La Compagnie Internationale des Wagons-Lits et des Grands Express Européen for service in Italy. Purchased by the Pullman Car Company Ltd. in 1928 and returned to Britain for Golden Arrow service. Entered Cunard boat train service between Victoria and Southampton, 1952. Retired 1968. Acquired from the Birmingham Railway Museum, 1981. Decoration: Greek dancing girls marquetry.
Ione	First class kitchen car, 20 seats, built 1928 by Metropolitan Cammell Carriage and Wagon Co. Ltd. for the Queen of Scots Pullman. Ocean Liner services to Plymouth or Southampton and Bournemouth Belle 1929–39. Queen of Scots 1948–54 and 1960–64. Golden Arrow, Yorkshire and South Wales Pullman 1954–60. On the high speed Talisman route (880 miles (1,416 km) per day) 1964–68. Retired 1968. Acquired from the Birmingham Railway Museum, 1981. Decoration: burr wood panels and Victorian frieze.
Lucille	First class parlour car, 24 seats, built 1928 by Metropolitan Cammell Carriage and Wagon Co. Ltd for the Queen of Scots Pullman of the London and North Eastern Railway. Transferred to Southern Region in 1963 and ran in Bournemouth Belle 1963–67. Preserved by Mr E Lewis-Evans at the South Eastern Steam Centre, Ashford 1968–84. Acquired in 1985. Decoration: Grecian urn design on green dyed holly wood.
Minerva	First class parlour car, 26 seats, built 1927 by Midland Railway Carriage and Wagon Co. Ltd. Devon Belle 1947–51. Used in the special Festival of Britain rake 1951. Golden Arrow 1951–61. Acquired from Lytham Creek Railway Museum 1981. Decoration: Edwardian-type marquetry.
Perseus	First class parlour car, 26 seats, construction commenced 1938 but completion deferred until 1951 due to war. Builders were Birmingham Railway Carriage and Wagon Co. Used in the special Festival of Britain rake; used in Winston Churchill's funeral train 1965; made last journey of Golden Arrow 1972. Acquired from North Yorkshire Moors Railway, 1977. Decoration: ash panels and old prints.
Phoenix	First class parlour car, 26 seats, built 1927 by Metropolitan Cammell Carriage and Wagon Co. Ltd, named Rainbow. Burned Micheldever, England 1936. Rebuilt 1952 by Preston Park Works, Brighton, and appropriately renamed Phoenix. Favourite carriage of the Queen Mother: used by General de Gaulle and visiting heads of state; made last journey of Golden Arrow 1972. Became stationary restaurant in Lyon, France 1973. Acquired 1980. Decoration: oval frames of marquetry flowers on American cherrywood.
Vera	First class kitchen car, 20 seats, built 1932 by Metropolitan Cammell Carriage and Wagon Co. Ltd for the Brighton Belle. Always paired with Audrey as a two-car unit. Directly hit in an air raid at Victoria Station in 1940. Roof extensively repaired, rejoined Brighton Belle in 1947. Used by royalty to review the Fleet in 1953 and for Prince Charles and Princess Anne's first trip on an electric train in 1954. Brighton Belle service withdrawn in 1972. Preserved as a garden house in Suffolk. Acquired in 1985 and joined the British Pullman train in 1990. Decoration: marquetry antelope leaping between palm trees.
Zena	First class parlour car, 24 seats, built 1928 by Metropolitan Cammell Carriage and Wagon Co. Ltd. Bournemouth Belle 1929–46. Queen of Scots and Yorkshire Pullman 1946–55. Golden Arrow 1955–60. Queen of Scots 1960–61. Tees–Tyne Pullman 1961–65. Used in film Agatha about Agatha Christie, 1976. Acquired from T Robinson 1979. Decoration: Art Deco marquetry.

A further seven unrestored carriages are stored for the train: four First (Phyllis, Agatha, Mona and Ruth) and two former Brighton Belle 5BEL Third carriages (No. 86, and 92). An eighth vehicle, Car 83 is also owned by the company, but runs as Mary on the Keighley and Worth Valley Railway.

Since 2025 the former driving motor carriage No. 93 of Brighton Belle is in restoration as private carriage Celia for 12 passengers. The interior design is made by Baz Luhrmann and his costumer designer wife Catherine Martin. The vehicle is scheduled to run from Summer 2026.

The train is completed by some luggage vans - particularly Mark 1's - used for staff and storage.

== See also ==
- Folkestone Harbour railway station
- Belmond Royal Scotsman
