= Bristolian =

Bristolian may refer to:

- A native of the city of Bristol, England
- The dialect of Bristol, England
- A follower of Bristol Bears rugby union club
- Old Bristolian, a former pupil of Bristol Grammar School
- The Bristolian (newspaper), a left-leaning newssheet published in the early 2000s often critical of Bristol City Council
- The Bristolian (train), a named passenger train of the Great Western Railway
