= Golden Hind (disambiguation) =

The Golden Hind was an English galleon captained by Sir Francis Drake.

Golden Hind or Golden Hinde may also refer to:

- Golden Hind (mythology), an enormous deer in Greek mythology
- Golden Hinde (mountain), a mountain on Vancouver Island, British Columbia, Canada
- Golden Hind (passenger train), a train in the United Kingdom
- Golden Hinde (1973), a replica of Drake's Golden Hind
- Golden Hind (1940 ship), see Boats of the Mackenzie River watershed
