= Railtour =

Special excursion by train

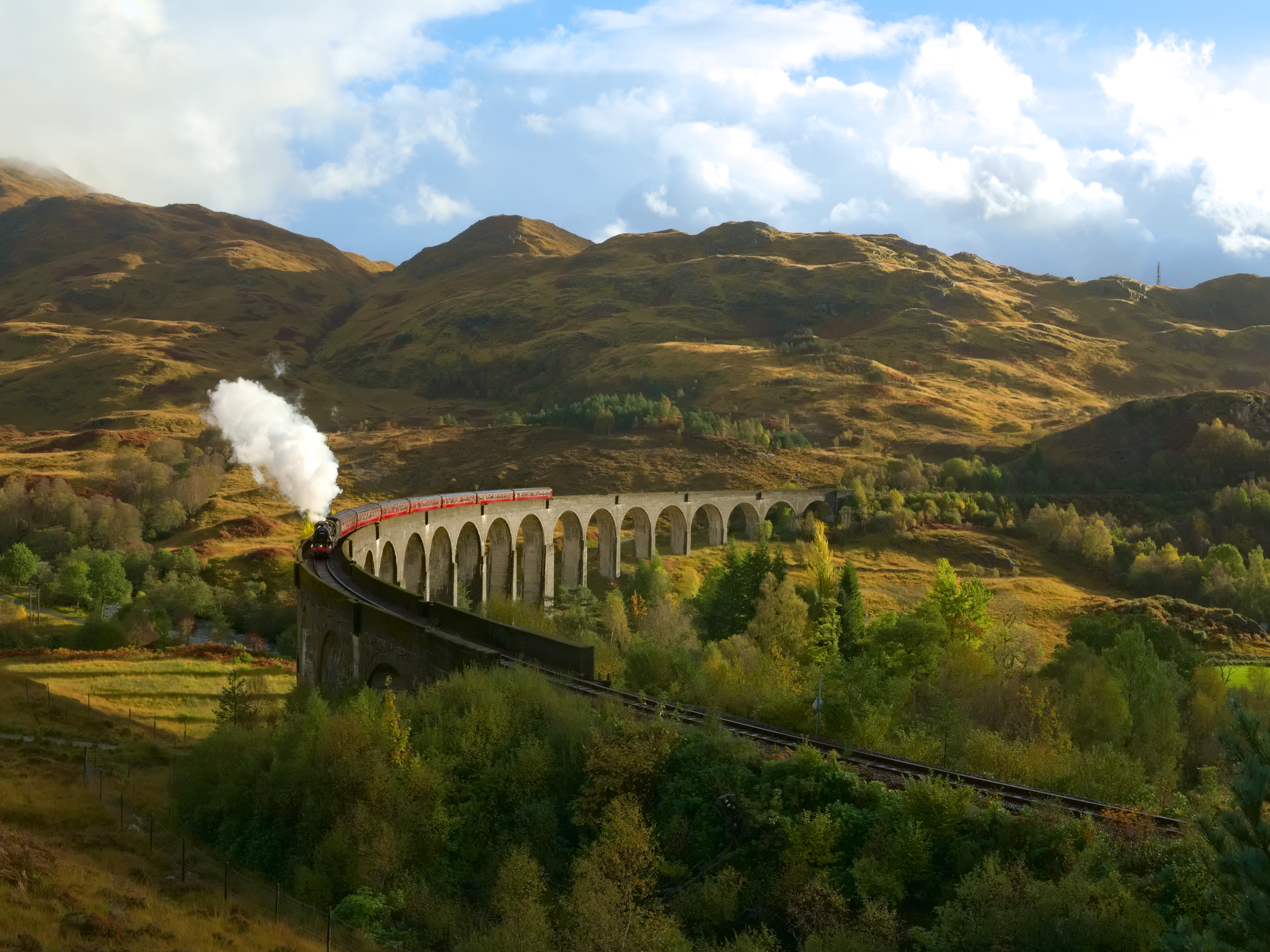
The Jacobite steam train crossing Glenfinnan Viaduct

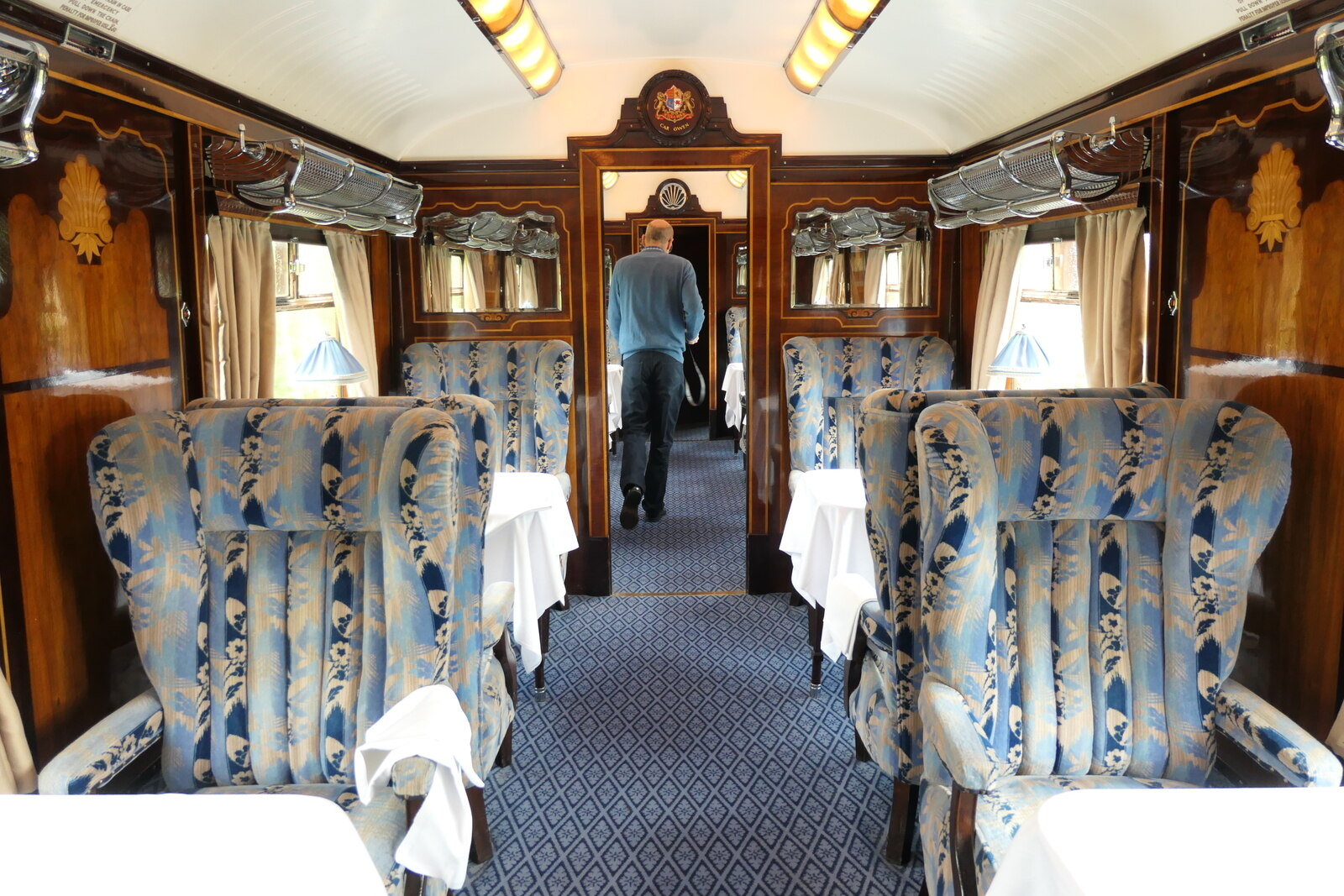
Belmond British pullman carriage 'Gwen' interior operating on a railtour

A railtour is a special train which is run in order to allow people to experience rail travel which is not normally available using timetabled passenger services. The 'unusual' aspect may be the route of the train, the destination, the occasion, specific sections of railway track (for example, freight-only lines), the locomotive hauling the train, the rolling stock (passenger carriages), or any combination of these.

Organisers may own or hire locomotives or rolling stock, or tours may be organised by railway management or other bodies outside the railway fraternity. Perhaps the most famous railtour in England was the Fifteen Guinea Special, the last steam-hauled main line train run by British Rail. Railtours are often identifiable through the use of a train headboard, often identifying the name of the specific tour or the tour operator. On TOPS, railtours are usually given a 1Zxx headcode. Exceptions to this rule include regularly scheduled railtours such as the Belmond British Pullman operated Venice-Simplon Orient Express trains.

== Types of railtour in the UK ==
=== Destination tours ===
A 'destination' railtour is often associated with a special event of railway significance. Open days or special events at heritage railway locations such as Barrow Hill Engine Shed and the West Somerset Railway have been destinations for railtours originating from large cities. Similarly, organisations such as the Crusader Union may hire a train to take a large number of people to a specific event.

=== Locomotive tours ===
A 'locomotive' railtour focuses on the type of locomotive hauling the train. This may be a preserved locomotive, a type not usually used for passenger trains, or a type of locomotive which normally works some distance from the chosen route. Railtours in the 1980s saw a Class 52 running to York and a Class 55 to Exeter.

=== Nostalgic tours ===
One type of railtour which is currently popular is the nostalgic excursion using a preserved train, or sometimes a train hired from a railway operator. Preserved steam locomotives are popular performers on UK railtours, sometimes covering 400 miles in one day at speeds of over 75 miles per hour. Train, branding and route are often chosen as to reflect a common theme, sometimes tracing an aspect of railway history. Railtours are organised both on a commercial basis and as a fund-raising method for railway preservation societies.

=== Track or route tours ===
A track or route railtour is focused on travelling over sections of railway track that are not used by scheduled passenger trains. Locations – such as Carne Point at Fowey, Cornwall – which have not seen passenger trains for several decades, or locations that have never had a public passenger service – such as the MOD depot at Long Marston – can be traversed by such trains.

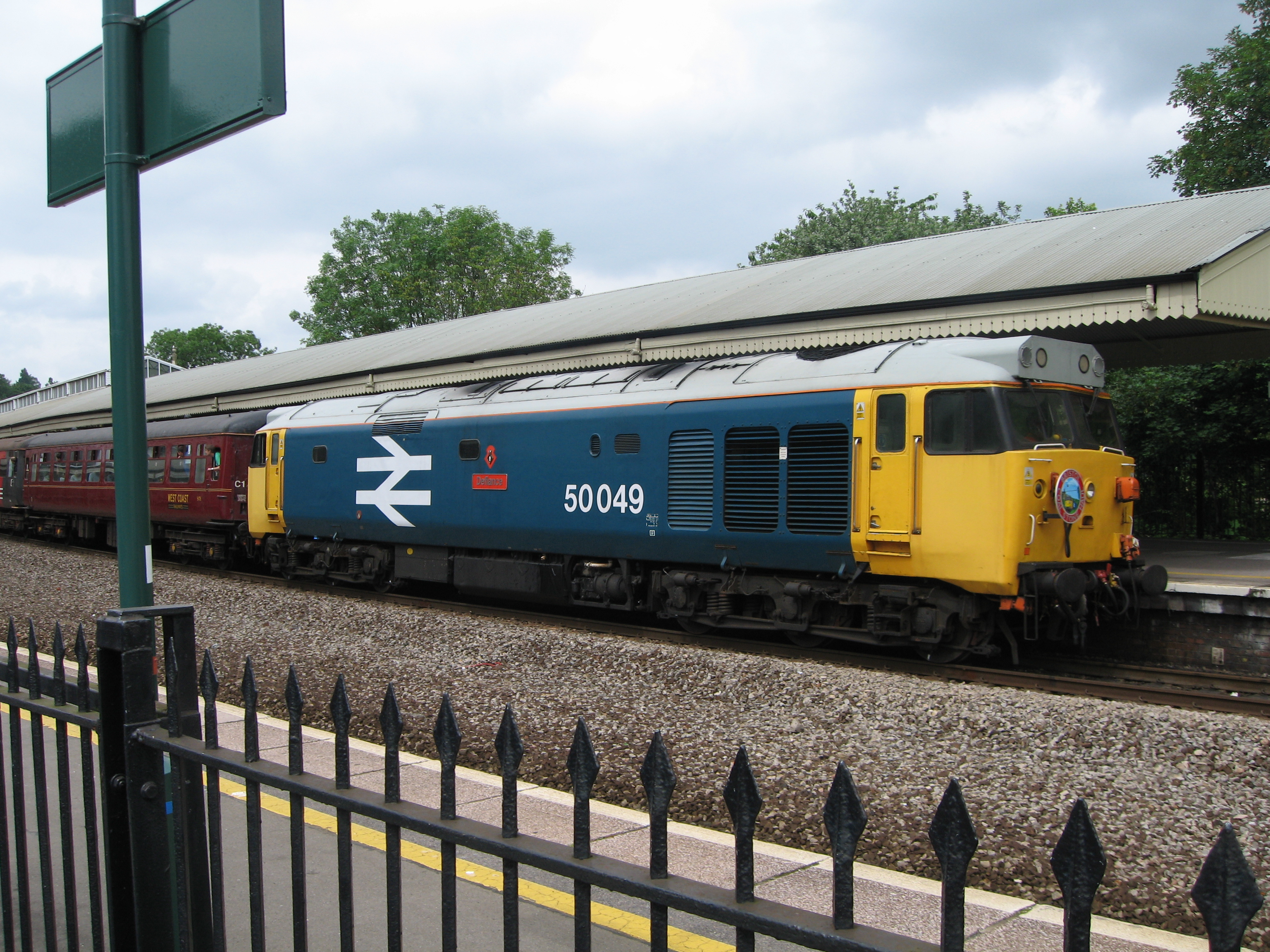
50049 Defiance, as preserved in BR "Large Logo" livery on a railtour at Bath Spa station on 3 June 2007

Several established railtour operators include:

- Branch Line Society
- Belmond British Pullman
- Deltic Preservation Society
- Scottish Railway Preservation Society
- Steam Dreams (operator of the Cathedrals Express railtours)
- Orient Express British Train
- Vintage Trains
- West Coast Railways (operator of The Jacobite (steam train) railtours from Fort William to Mallaig, which runs on every weekday throughout the summer months, and the Scarborough Spa Express)

Former railtour operators include:

- Compass Tours (defunct 2014)
- Hertfordshire Rail Tours (defunct 2006)
- Pathfinder Tours (defunt 2025)
- Torbay Express (merged into Pathfinder)

== Railtour operators in Ireland ==
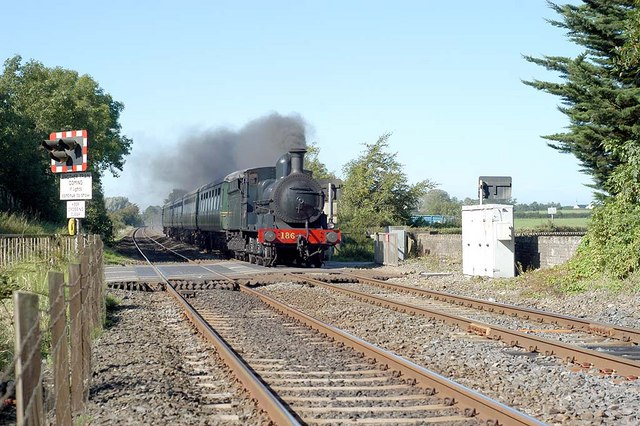
Railway Preservation Society of Ireland railtour on the Belfast-Dublin railway line.

Current railtours include:

- Irish Railway Record Society
- Táilte Tours
- Railway Preservation Society of Ireland
- Railtours Ireland (Emerald Isle Express)

Former railtour operators include:

- Southern Railtours
- ITG Railtours Ltd
- Ian Walsh
- Westrail
- Belmond Grand Hibernian
- Steam Dreams (Emerald Isle Explorer)
- Modern Railway Society of Ireland
- Great Southern Railway Preservation Society

== See also ==
- Mainline steam trains in Great Britain
- Railway enthusiast
