= Bournemouth Belle =

United Kingdom passenger train (1931-1967)

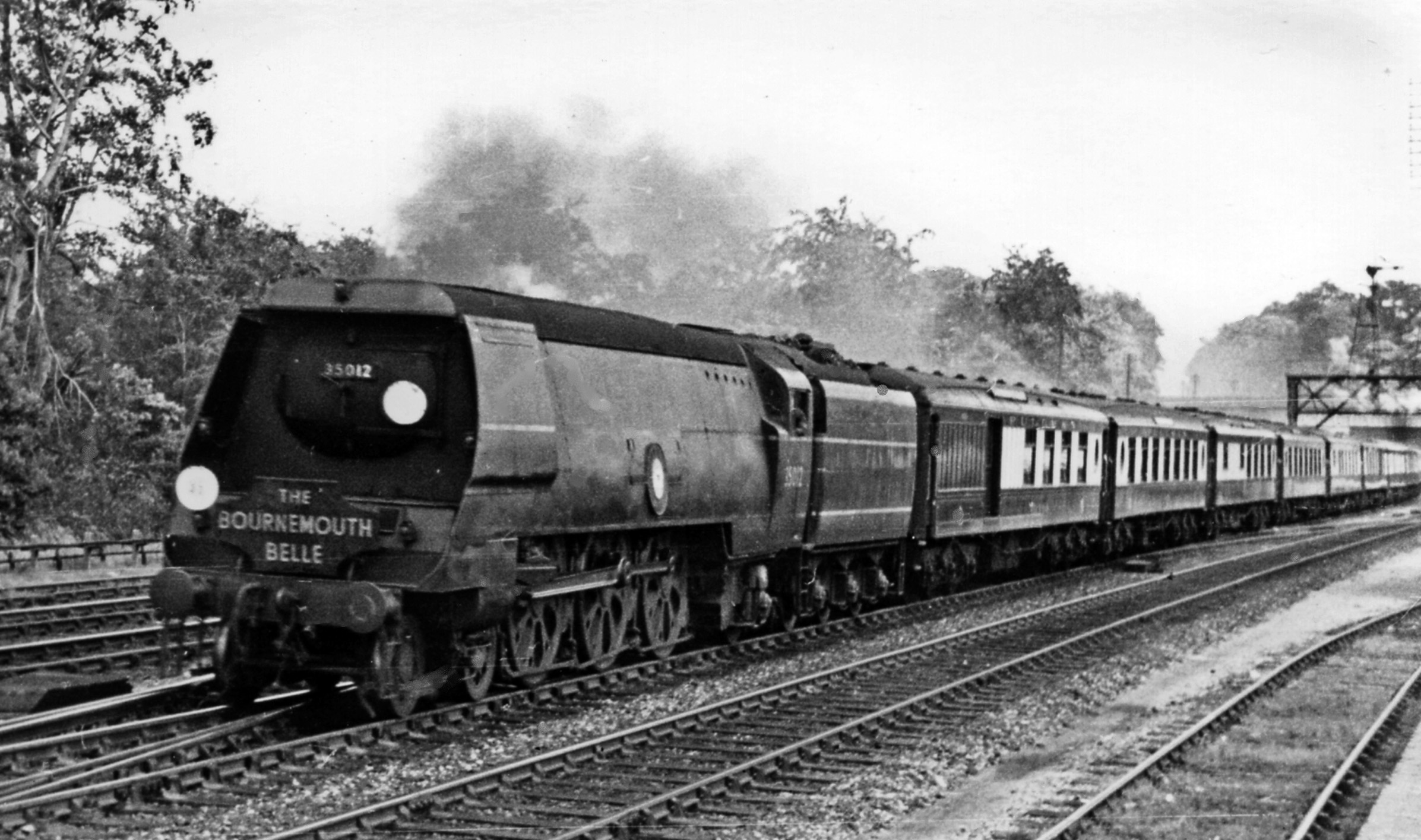
Merchant Navy class 35012 United States Lines hauling the Bournemouth Belle in 1950

The Bournemouth Belle was a British named train run by the Southern Railway from 1931 until nationalisation in 1948 (with a break for the war until 1947) and subsequently by British Railways until it was withdrawn on 9 July 1967.

The train, composed of Pullman stock, first ran on Sunday 5 July 1931. It initially ran non-stop from London Waterloo, leaving at 10:30, to Bournemouth Central, returning at 19:18. The service was later amended to call at Southampton, and extended from Bournemouth Central to Bournemouth West. Journey time was between two hours one minute and two hours twenty minutes, depending on direction, configuration and motive power.

At first the train ran on summer Sundays. It was sufficiently successful to be run on all weekends and summer weekdays until in 1936 it was a daily working.

Before the war the train was usually hauled by SR Lord Nelson Class locomotives. On its reintroduction on 7 October 1947 the superior SR Merchant Navy class provided motive power. The weight of the Belle and other express trains on the London–Bournemouth route meant a decision was made to continue with steam in the early 1960s until electrification was completed. In the mid-1960s, heavy trains like the Belle needed fast acceleration, at which the Bulleid Pacifics excelled, due to delays during third-rail electrification work, the Bournemouth Belle was the last great named steam train with a patronage of rock stars and aristocrats as well as ferry and ocean liner passengers from Southampton and tourists visiting Bournemouth. The Bournemouth Belle was steam-hauled almost daily until January 1967, and steam often relieved broken-down diesels until the last week. The final trains in 1967 were hauled by British Rail Class 47 diesels. D1924 (now 47810) worked the last run on 9 July 1967.

The Southern Railway ran three Pullman trains with the suffix Belle. The others were the Brighton Belle (originally the Southern Belle) and the Devon Belle. British Railways introduced the Thanet Belle (later renamed the Kentish Belle) in 1948.

On 5 July 2017, to mark 50 years since the Bournemouth Belle steamed to the coast, the Merchant Navy Locomotive Preservation Society put on a re-creation service using its locomotive 35028 Clan Line.

== See also ==
List of named passenger trains of the United Kingdom
