= The Red Dragon (train) =

Overview
- Service type: Passenger train
- First service: 5 June 1950
- Current operator: Great Western Railway
- Former operator: Western Region of British Railways

Route
- Termini: Carmarthen; London Paddington
- Service frequency: Daily
- Train number: 1L12 / 1B27
- Lines used: Great Western; South Wales; West Wales

Technical
- Rolling stock: GWR 4073 Castle, BR Standard Class 7 Britannia (1950-1965); Intercity 125 (1983-2018); 800/3 (2019-present)

The Red Dragon is a named passenger train service operated by Great Western Railway in the United Kingdom from Carmarthen to London Paddington.

== History ==
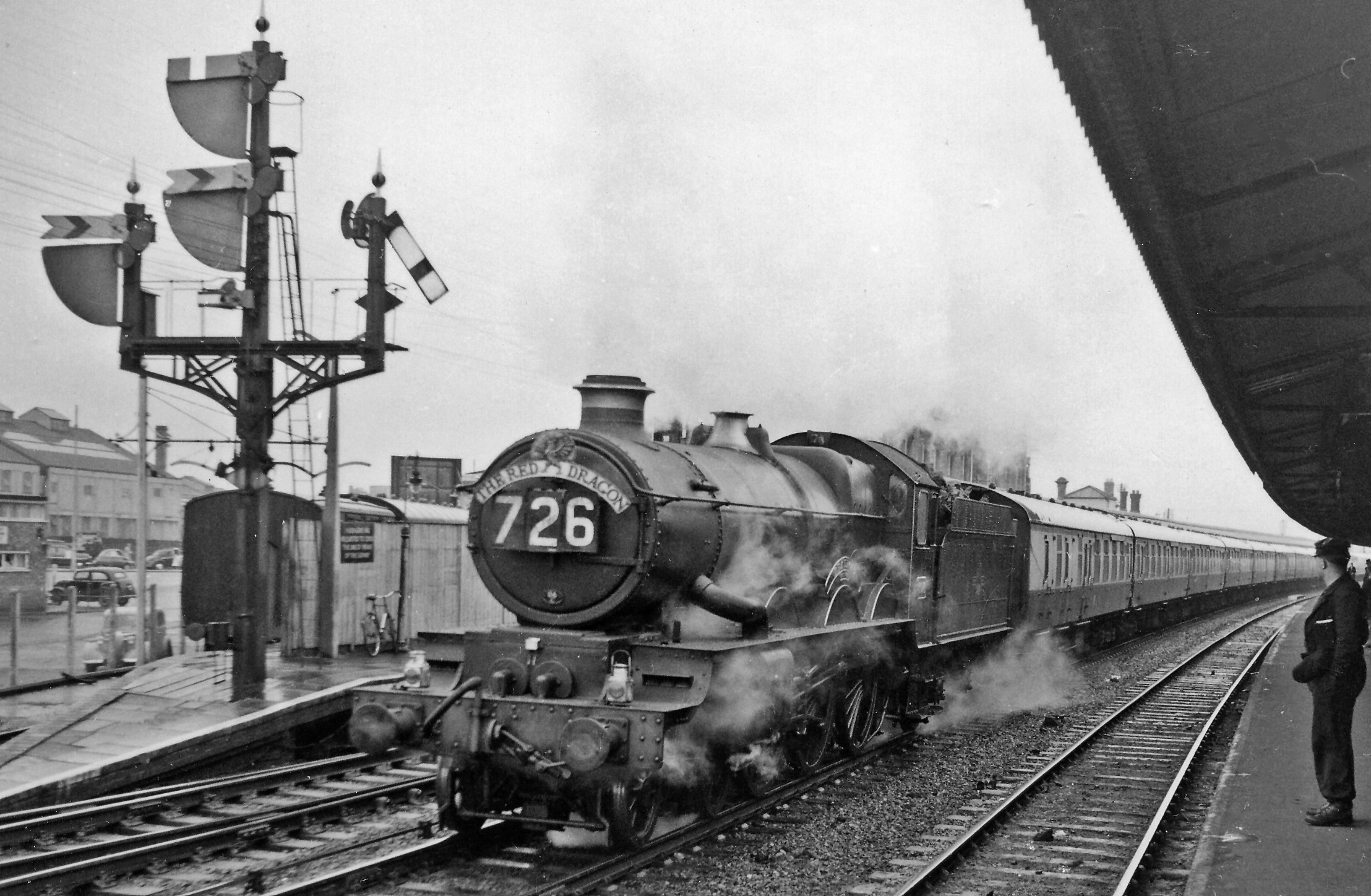
The Red Dragon passing through Reading in 1958, hauled by Castle class 5078 Beaufort

The Red Dragon was introduced by the Western Region of British Railways on 5 June 1950, departing Carmarthen at 07:30 for London Paddington, returning at 17:55. However, in practice the main train started and terminated at Swansea with only a through portion working west of there to Carmarthen. Haulage was by Castle class locomotives at first, then by BR Standard Class 7 Britannias. Both were supplied by Cardiff Canton MPD.

It was withdrawn on 12 June 1965. It was resurrected in 1983/84 as The Red Dragon Executive' with InterCity 125s, becoming The Red Dragon Pullman in 1988. It was withdrawn again, before being reintroduced by First Great Western on 13 December 2009.

As at July 2019, the name was carried by the 07:30 from Carmarthen and the 17:45 return operated by Class 800s.

== Headboards ==
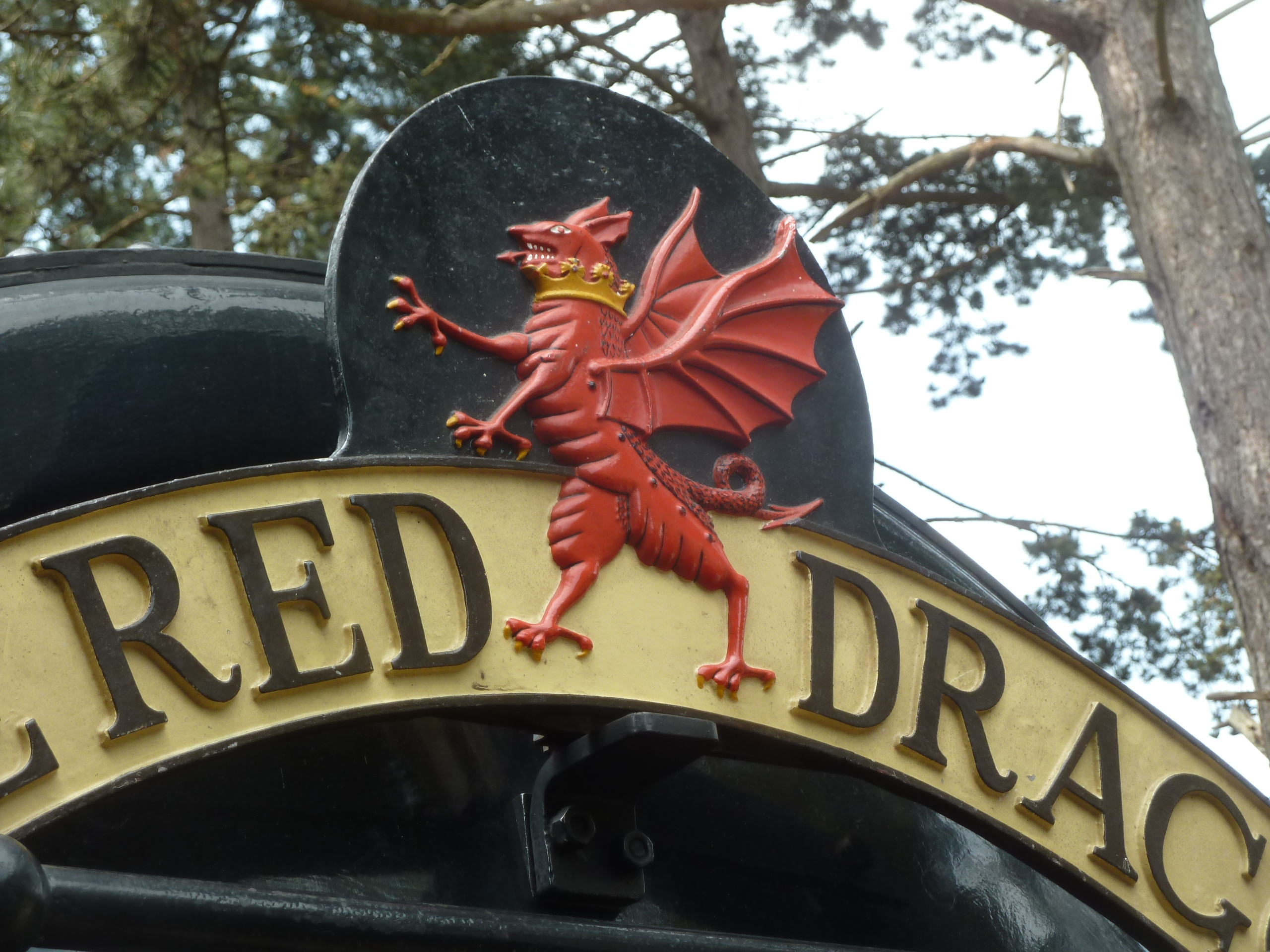
Close-up of the dragon crest, third headboard

The Red Dragon carried a variety of headboards, mostly of two designs.

- The first design was a BR Type 3 headboard, in black or red with polished aluminium lettering. This was introduced in the Summer of 1951. As for other headboards of the time, in the Coronation year of 1953 a crown crest was used temporarily.
- In 1956, a reversed style of painting was briefly used, with dark painted letters on a light background, still using the Type 3 design.
- The third style was the best known. Introduced in 1956 and used until 1962, it was one of the Western Region designs to recreate a sense of regional identity. The shape was a curved rectangle, without the cutouts to the upper corners. It was painted overall, cream with brown letters. In the upper centre a disc protruding above the main headboard carried a moulded figure of a red dragon.
- A final design was used experimentally in late 1961. This was one of the rectangular fibreglass lightweight plates, intended for diesel haulage.
