= The Bristolian (train) =

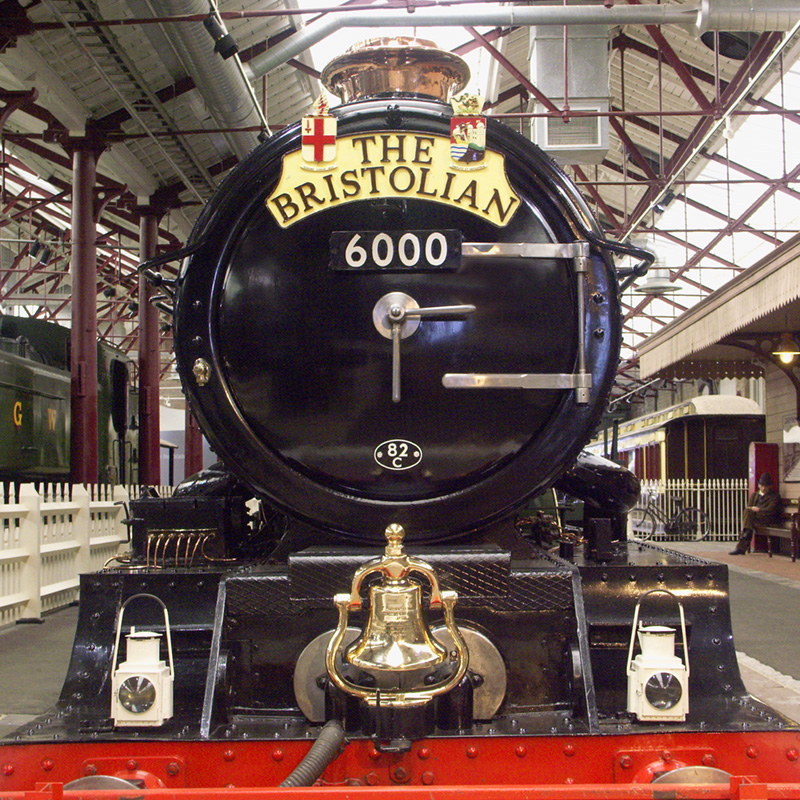
The GWR steam engine King George V at Swindon Steam Railway Museum, wearing a headboard as The Bristolian

The Bristolian is a named passenger train service from London Paddington to Bristol Temple Meads. It starts at Weston-super-Mare in the London-bound direction.

Inaugurated in 1935 by the Great Western Railway company, the Bristolian name was retained by British Railways and is still used by its successor, Great Western Railway.

== Story of the train ==
The Bristolian was inaugurated in 1935 by the Great Western Railway (GWR) to celebrate the opening of the Great Western Main Line from Paddington to Bristol in 1835, and is notable in that the route taken differed in the up and down directions. The down train (from Paddington) took Brunel's original route via Bath, but the up train (from Bristol) climbed the 1 in 75 of Filton Bank through what is now Bristol Parkway and then continued climbing the 1 in 300 of the Badminton Line to Badminton before rejoining the down route at Wootton Bassett. This meant that the up train had a slightly shorter route of 117.6 miles (compared to 118.3 miles in the down direction via Bath), but with the stiff climb was probably the harder.

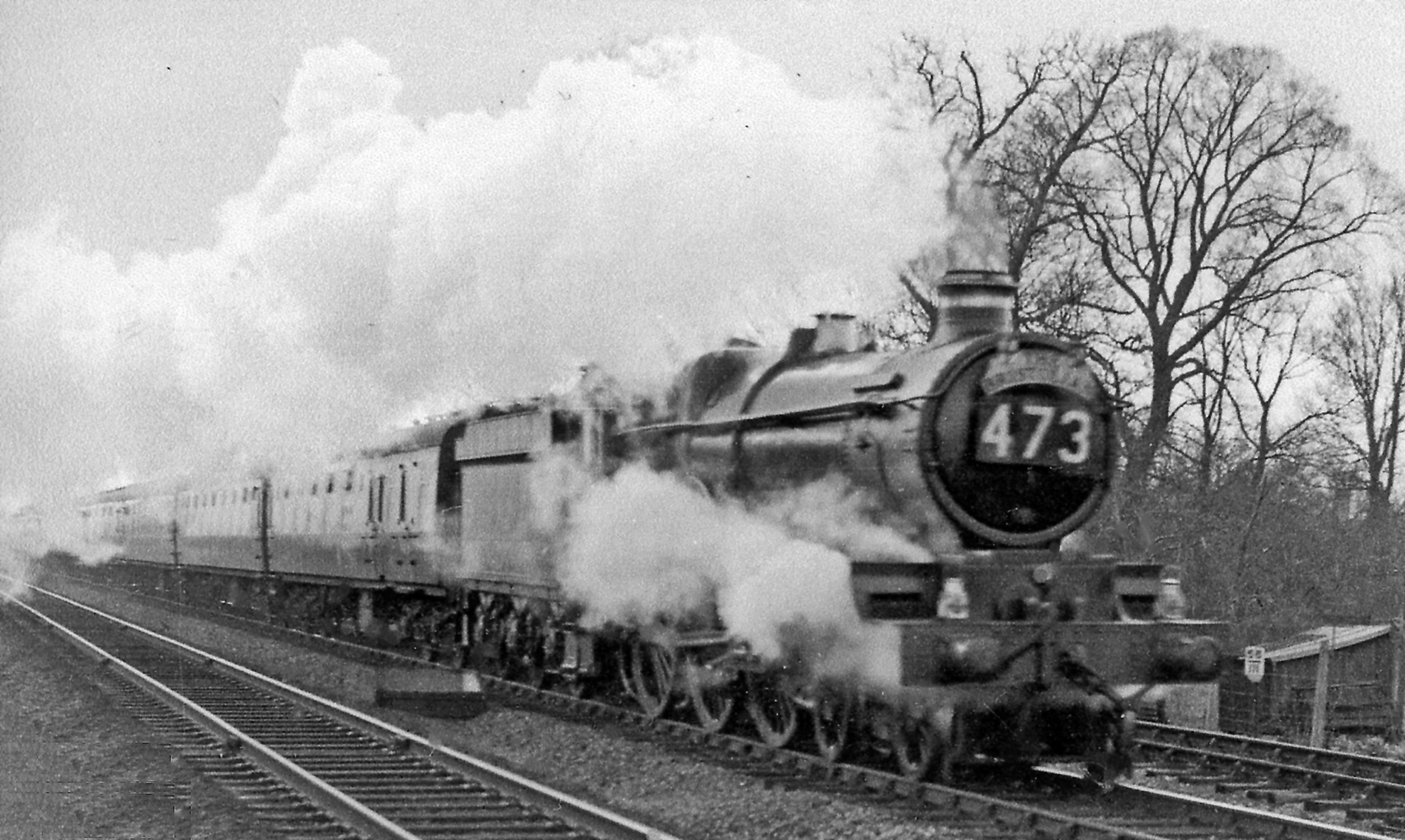
Up Bristolian passing Steventon in 1958

The train was scheduled to leave Paddington at 11.00am, and take 105 minutes for the non-stop run to Bristol Temple Meads, with the return leaving Bristol at 4.30pm with the same non-stop time. It was initially made up of 7 Collett coaches and hauled by a King class locomotive, at the time the top GWR passenger class. Later the Castle class steam locomotives and, from 1959, Warship class diesel-hydraulic locomotives were used.

The service was suspended during World War 2, and it was not until 1954 that the 105-minute schedule was again achieved. During this time The Bristolian became one of the few named trains to be scheduled for haulage by a gas turbine locomotive when, between April and May 1952 it was scheduled for haulage by 18100, the Metropolitan-Vickers experimental locomotive; but otherwise the mid 1950s was a time of very fast running under steam haulage, the intention being to reduce the regular schedule below 100 minutes. The fastest recorded was hauled by 7018 Drysllwyn Castle in April 1958, taking 93 minutes 50 seconds with a top speed of 102 mph. The change to diesel traction saw Warship class D805 Benbow haul an 8-coach Bristolian on the opening day of the 1959 summer timetable in 93 minutes 48 seconds, and over that summer several similar times were recorded until civil engineering concerns placed a 90 mph limit on the line, and the 100 mph running required for such times was no longer possible.

By 1966, Western diesels had taken over from the Warships, and although not officially advertised as The Bristolian the train, now sometimes having 12 coaches, was still achieving the 105 minute schedule even with a stop at Bath included (the up route having been changed in 1961). In 1971 the route was again altered: both the up and down trains were routed via Badminton and called at the newly opened Bristol Parkway, and the load was limited to 10 coaches giving an overall schedule of 110 minutes. The final version of the loco-hauled Bristolian came about in 1973 with the introduction of air-conditioned Mark 2 coaches, and the replacement of the Westerns by Class 47 diesels.

== Headboard ==
Three different headboard designs were used. Under the GWR there was no headboard, although the three-digit GWR train reporting number was carried: 016, 116 (down trains from London), 470, 473 (up trains from Bristol). When the first post-war BR Bristolian was reintroduced in 1951 there was still no headboard.

The first headboard was introduced in 1953. This used a standard BR Type 3 plate design in black, with polished aluminium letters. As this was the Coronation year, this plate was adorned with a coronation crest.

On 11 June 1956 the headboard design was changed to the new Western Region style of painted brown letters on a cream board, surmounted by the crests of London and Bristol. A headboard was rarely carried in the final years after 1962, until the final run on 12 June 1965.

== Bristol Pullman ==
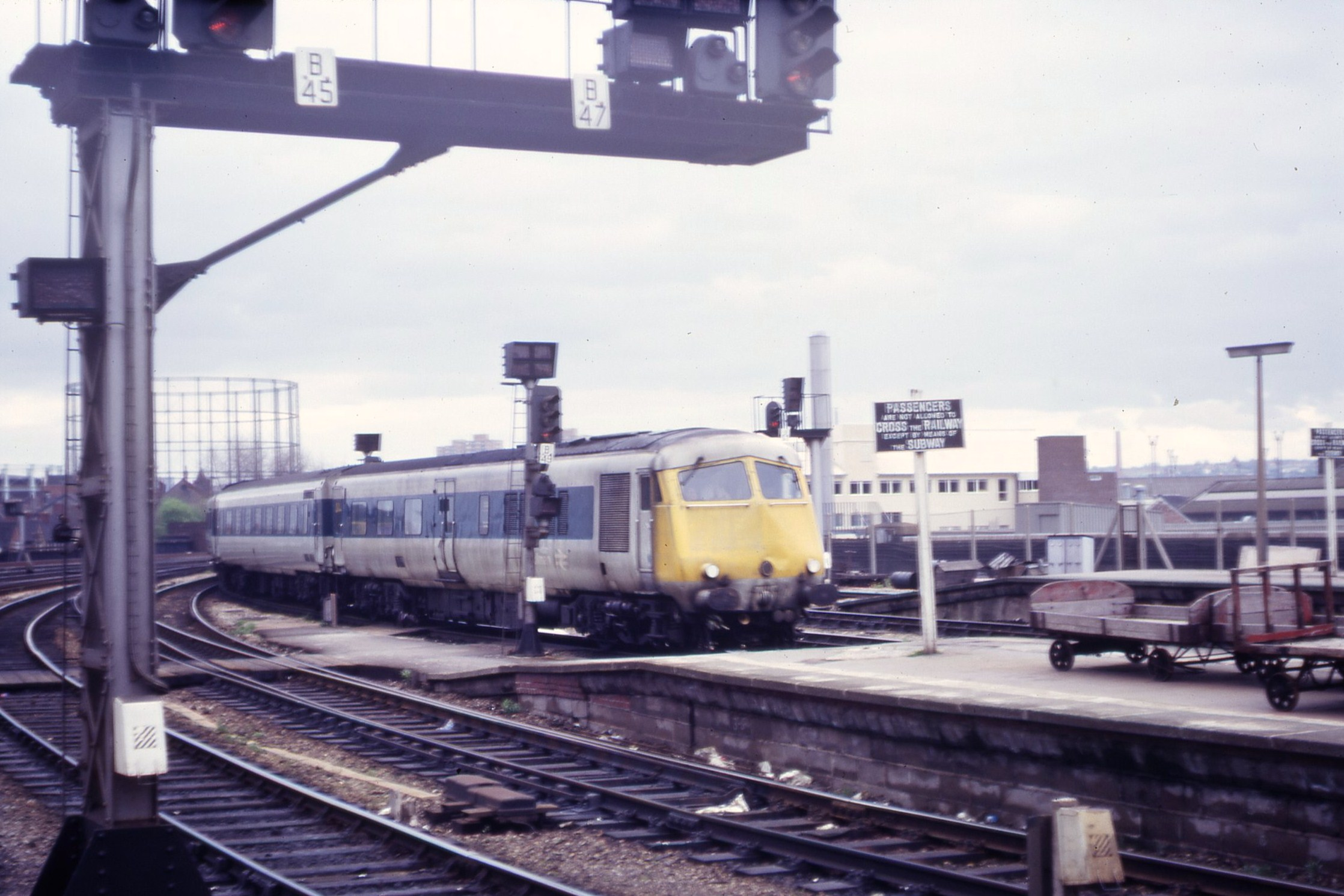
The last down Bristol Pullman arriving at Bristol Temple Meads on 5 May 1973

In 1960 the BR Western Region introduced an all-pullman Blue Pullman set running between Paddington and Bristol, and this was considered the premier train between the two cities, even though the timing was slightly slower than The Bristolian. The first Bristol Pullman ran on 12 September 1960, and in the up direction after leaving Bristol Temple Meads, it called at Bath at 8.00am, and arrived at Paddington by 9.30am. The last service was on 5 May 1973.

== Heritage runs ==
On 12 December 2009, a commemorative train (also called The Bristolian) was hauled from Bristol to London by King-class Locomotive King Edward I.

On 17 April 2010, another commemorative train, to mark the GWR 175th anniversary, and also called The Bristolian, was hauled non-stop from London to Bristol, and later the same day back from Bristol to London, by Castle class locomotive no. 5043 Earl of Mount Edgcumbe. These trains were the first non-stop steam trains between these cities for about 50 years. On the return journey, arrival at Paddington was about 45 minutes early, just under 1 hour and 50 minutes after leaving Bristol Temple Meads. The journey time was only a few minutes longer than the schedule for the non-stop Bristolian in the late 1950s, and was achieved notwithstanding the current speed limit for steam of 75 mph, which did not apply in the 1950s.

== See also ==
- List of named passenger trains of the United Kingdom
