= Sussex Scot =

Named train on British Railways

The Sussex Scot was one of a number of named trains introduced by the British Rail InterCity sector during the 1980s. The train ran between Brighton and Glasgow Central / Edinburgh Waverley via Kensington Olympia, Reading, Birmingham New Street and major stations on the West Coast Main Line to Carstairs where the train divided into portions for Glasgow Central and Edinburgh Waverley.

There had been a direct train service between Brighton and Manchester Piccadilly since 14 May 1979. The first departure of the Sussex Scot was 16 May 1988. The northbound train departed Brighton at 13:15 and arrived at Glasgow Central 22:48 and Edinburgh Waverley 22:52. Southbound the train departed Glasgow Central 10:50 and Edinburgh Waverley 10:44 and arrived at Brighton 20:20. The train was normally formed of 10 coaches. A class 47 locomotive hauled the train between Brighton and Birmingham New Street and vice versa with usually a class 86 or class 87 electric locomotive between Birmingham New Street and Scotland. From 15 May 1989 the departure time from Brighton was moved to the more convenient time of 0845 arriving in Glasgow Central at 17:32 and Edinburgh Waverley at 17:47. This is when the train acquired its 1S76 headcode.

From 14 May 1990 the departure time from Brighton was moved again to 09:18 with an arrival time in Glasgow Central at 18:10. The Edinburgh portion no longer ran. Southbound departure from Glasgow Central was 11:33 with an arrival in Brighton at 20:21. Over the following years the destination swapped between Glasgow Central and Edinburgh Waverley but the times remained largely unaltered.

The next major change was for the summer 1994 timetable. From 16 May 1994 both north and southbound trains also served Manchester Piccadilly. Departure from Brighton was at 09:20 arriving at Manchester Piccadilly at 15:22 and at Glasgow Central 19:12. Southbound the Sussex Scot departed Glasgow Central at 1040, Manchester Piccadilly at 14:17 and arrived at Brighton 20:28. The locomotive change from diesel to electric was now done at Preston. By this date the formation of the train had been reduced to 7 coaches. There was little change over the following years even when Virgin CrossCountry won the franchise for the CrossCountry rail network in 1997. New Voyager trains were introduced on the service from 2001. The introduction of Virgin CrossCountry Operation Princess saw the last run of the Sussex Scot on 28 September 2002, after that date services from Brighton whilst increased in number went no further than Manchester Piccadilly; they subsequently ceased altogether in 2008 under the new CrossCountry franchise.
