= The Inter-City =

Express passenger train

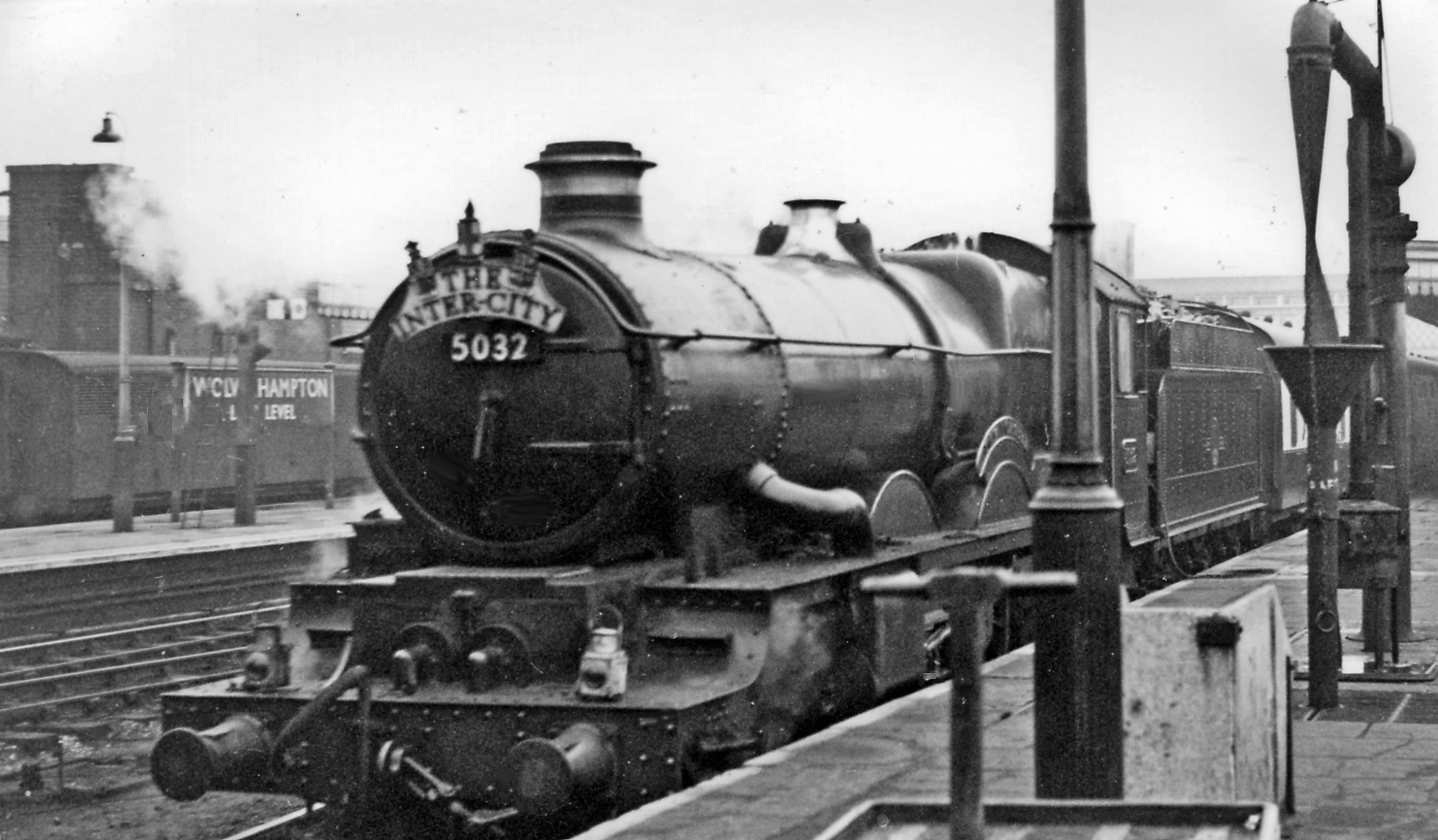
The Inter-City, Wolverhampton (1958)

The Inter-City was a British named express passenger train operated by the Western Region of British Railways (WR) between London Paddington and Wolverhampton Low Level via Birmingham Snow Hill. It connected England's first and second cities, London and Birmingham.

Introduced in 1950, The Inter-City can claim to be the origin of all later usages of the railway term "InterCity" (with or without a hyphen) worldwide. In the winter 1959-60 timetable, the train became just one of an hourly all-day restaurant-car service between Paddington and Wolverhampton, as the WR service was ramped up to compensate for the absence of trains on the West Coast Main Line during electrification work on the latter.

== See also ==
List of named passenger trains of the United Kingdom
