= Brighton Belle street mural =

Mural by Terry Smith in Brighton, England

- Year: 2010
- Location: United Kingdom

The Brighton Belle mural is a series of three painted panels set into the arches of the forecourt of Brighton station, on Trafalgar Street, Brighton. The mural depicts a full-size view of one of the carriages of the Brighton Belle Pullman electric train waiting to depart Brighton Station.

The mural is designed to show a view of the train as seen through the arches, and occupies three of the four arches occupied by Brighton Toy and Model Museum. Laurence Olivier, the leading actor of his day and a regular traveller on the train, is pictured at one of the carriage windows.

It is within sight of another well-known Brighton mural, Banksy's Kissing Coppers.

== Unveiling ==
The mural's official unveiling was part of the advance publicity for the relaunch of the restored Brighton Belle train. The mural was designed by Chris Littledale and painted by Terry Smith, and unveiled on 23 September 2010 by the Mayor of Brighton, Geoffrey Wells, and Sir William McAlpine, with the top of Trafalgar Street being closed for the ceremony.
