= Welsh Dragon (passenger train) =

Welsh Dragon / Draig Cymreig
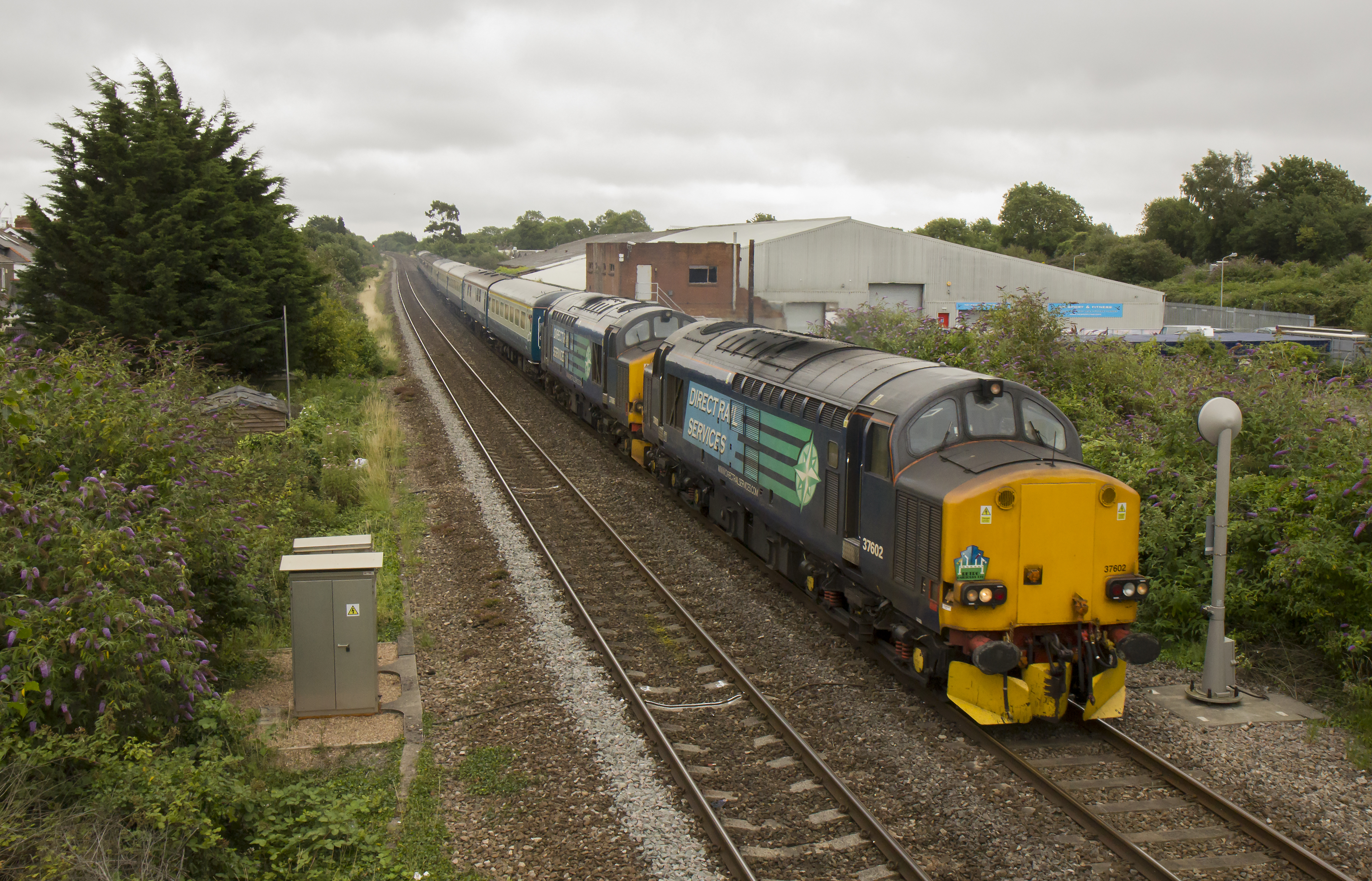

Overview
- Service type: Passenger train
- First service: December 2004
- Former operator(s): Virgin Trains

Route
- Termini: London Euston; Holyhead
- Distance travelled: 263.5 miles (424.1 km)
- Service frequency: Daily
- Line(s) used: West Coast Main Line; North Wales Coast Line

The Welsh Dragon (Welsh: Draig Cymreig) was a named passenger train operating in the United Kingdom.

== History ==
The service was introduced in December 2004 by Virgin Trains between London Euston and Holyhead. The 5.38am service from Holyhead with a return from Euston at 5.21pm was given the name.

By 2017 the name had fallen out of use.
