= The Palatine =

Overview
- Service type: Passenger train
- First service: 1938
- Last service: 1964
- Former operator(s): LMS, BR

Route
- Termini: London St Pancras; Manchester Central
- Service frequency: Daily
- Line(s) used: Midland Main Line

The Palatine was the name given to an express passenger train, introduced by the London, Midland and Scottish Railway in 1938: the 10.00 from Manchester Central to London St Pancras and the return working, the 16.30 from St Pancras to Manchester Central. The name derives from the county of Lancashire, a County Palatine.

A matching service, the 10.30 from St Pancras to Manchester Central, and the 16.25 from Manchester Central to St Pancras, introduced in the same year, was named the Peaks Express.

Both services were suspended at the outbreak of World War II. However British Railways resurrected the Palatine name postwar for the 07.55 from St Pancras and the 14.25 from Manchester. This train made the trip in 3 hours 55 minutes, with stops at Chinley, Millers Dale, Matlock, Derby and Leicester. The name was withdrawn in 1964.

The direct line to Derby via Millers Dale was closed in 1968. Today there are no direct passenger services between Manchester and St Pancras.

== Sources ==
- Bentley, C., (1997) British Railways Operating History: Volume one, The Peak District, Carnarvon: XPress Publishing.
