= Aberdonian (passenger train) =

United Kingdom passenger train

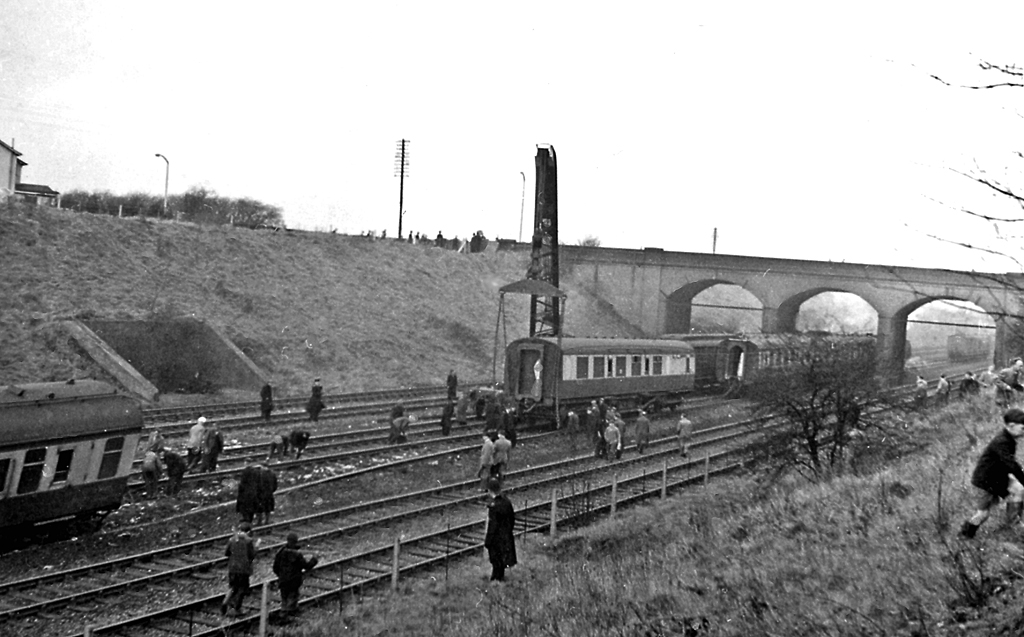
- The wreckage of the Up Aberdonian on 8 January 1957.

Overview
- Service type: Passenger train
- First service: 1 January 1927
- Last service: 1971
- Successor: Night Aberdonian
- Former operators: LNER, BR

Route
- Termini: London Kings Cross; Aberdeen
- Service frequency: Daily
- Line used: East Coast Main Line

The Aberdonian was a named passenger train operating in the United Kingdom.

== History ==
On 1 January 1927 the London and North Eastern Railway decided to officially adopt the name Aberdonian for its sleeping car express between King's Cross and Aberdeen. It was timed to depart King's Cross at 7:40 pm with a journey time to Aberdeen of a little over 11 hours, originally being hauled by Class C11 locomotives.

By 1939 the train was departing King's Cross at 7:30 pm. A restaurant car was provided as far as York. At Edinburgh, sections of train were disconnected to form services to Fort William and Mallaig, and Perth and Inverness. The Aberdeen section of the train called at Dundee, Arbroath, Montrose and Stonehaven, arriving in Aberdeen at 7:30 am, a journey time of exactly 12 hours. The return journey left Aberdeen at 7:35 pm, and arrived in King's Cross 11 hours 50 minutes later, with journey times shortened by streamlined P2 and A4 engines.

The Aberdonian continued during the Second World War with extended journey times and afterwards Peppercorn A1 locomotives, but noticeable improvements were only achieved with the introduction of Deltic locomotives, which reduced the journey time to 11 hours 10 minutes.

On 7 January 1957 the Aberdonian ran into the back of a local train one mile south of Welwyn Garden City railway station. The accident killed 3 people and injured 26.

On 7 May 1969, six people died and 46 were injured in one of the accidents at Morpeth when the Aberdonian hauled by Deltic locomotive No. 9011 The Royal Northumberland Fusiliers entered a 40 miles per hour (64 km/h) speed restriction at 82 miles per hour (132 km/h). All eleven coaches were derailed.

In 1971, British Rail withdrew the name Aberdonian from the early evening departure from King's Cross, then timed at 7:55 pm. The name Night Aberdonian was then used on the 10.15 King's Cross to Aberdeen sleeper service. This also crashed at Morpeth, in 1984.

== Similarly-Named Locomotive ==
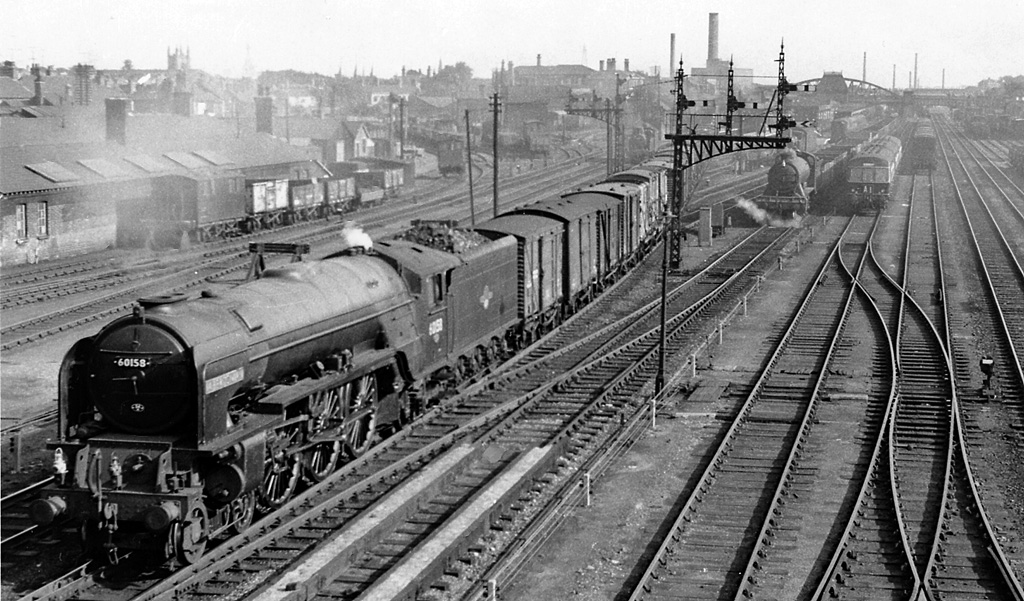
No. 60158, "Aberdonian," working a goods train in 1958.

One of the Peppercorn A1-class 4-6-2 locomotives often assigned to The Aberdonian was No. 60158, which was itself named "Aberdonian" in 1951. The locomotive was built in November of 1949, and spent much of its service life working trains out of "Top Shed," the engine house at King's Cross, or working out of Grantham. Despite sharing its name with the train, however, No. 60158 was assigned to a wide variety of trains, including goods trains, troop trains, and other named trains like the Morning Talisman and the Flying Scotsman. No. 60158 was withdrawn from service in 1964 after 15 years of service.
