= Lewisman (train) =

Overview
- Service type: Passenger train
- First service: 17 July 1933
- Former operator: London, Midland and Scottish Railway

Route
- Termini: Inverness; Kyle of Lochalsh
- Service frequency: Daily
- Line used: Kyle of Lochalsh line

The Lewisman was a named passenger train operating in the United Kingdom.

== History ==
The Lewisman service was introduced on 17 July 1933 by the London, Midland and Scottish Railway. Along with its companion, The Hebridean, it was a summer-only express between Inverness and the Kyle of Lochalsh connecting with steamers to the Isle of Skye and Stornoway. The Lewisman left the Kyle of Lochalsh at 5.00am, arriving in Inverness at 8.10am. A through coach for Glasgow was then attached to the 08.35am express for Glasgow, enabling a passenger to connect with the Mid-Day Scot to London. The Lewisman then departed Inverness at 10.15am with the addition of a restaurant car, and arrived in the Kyle of Lochalsh at 1.40pm.

After the Second World War, the Lewisman did not reappear.
