= Ulster Express =

Overview
- Service type: Passenger train
- First service: 11 July 1927
- Last service: 5 April 1975
- Former operator(s): London, Midland & Scottish Railway; British Rail

Route
- Termini: London Euston; Fleetwood / Heysham Port
- Service frequency: Daily
- Line(s) used: West Coast Main Line

The Ulster Express was a named passenger train operating in England operated by the London, Midland & Scottish Railway and later British Rail from London Euston to Fleetwood and later Heysham Port where it connected with ferry services to Belfast.

== History ==
The Ulster Express was introduced into service by the London, Midland & Scottish Railway and began operating on 11 July 1927 between London Euston and Fleetwood. The northbound service departed London Euston at 6.10pm, with the southbound working departed Fleetwood at 6.05pm. It was usually hauled by a LMS Royal Scot Class locomotive. From April 1928, it was diverted to terminate at Heysham Port instead of Fleetwood.

The service was suspended in 1939 after the outbreak of World War II. resuming on 26 September 1949. In 1955 the service saw the introduction of stainless steel first-class coaches with corridor compartments and open saloons in which the seats were pivoted, so that they could be rotated to form groups of four. It was withdrawn by British Rail on 5 April 1975 when the ferry service between Heysham Port and Belfast was withdrawn.
