= Hebridean (train) =

The Hebridean
Overview
- Service type: Passenger train
- First service: 17 July 1933
- Former operators: London, Midland and Scottish Railway; British Rail

Route
- Termini: Inverness; Kyle of Lochalsh
- Service frequency: Daily
- Line used: Kyle of Lochalsh line

The Hebridean was a named passenger train operating in the United Kingdom.

== History ==
The service was introduced on 17 July 1933 by the London, Midland and Scottish Railway. Along with its companion, The Lewisman, it was a summer-only express between Inverness and the Kyle of Lochalsh connecting with steamers to the Isle of Skye and Stornoway. The Hebridean departed from Inverness at 7.25am, reaching Kyle of Lochalsh at 10.31am, returning at 10.45am arriving in Inverness at 2.00pm. It carried a through coach to and from Glasgow Buchanan Street.

After the Second World War, the Hebridean was retimed to leave Inverness at 10.40am, arriving into Kyle of Lochalsh at 1.40pm. Eventually the name was dropped, but it was reintroduced by British Rail in 1965 on trains departing Kyle of Lochalsh at 11.10am, and Inverness at 10.40am.
