= Harrogate Pullman =

English passenger train, 1923–1928

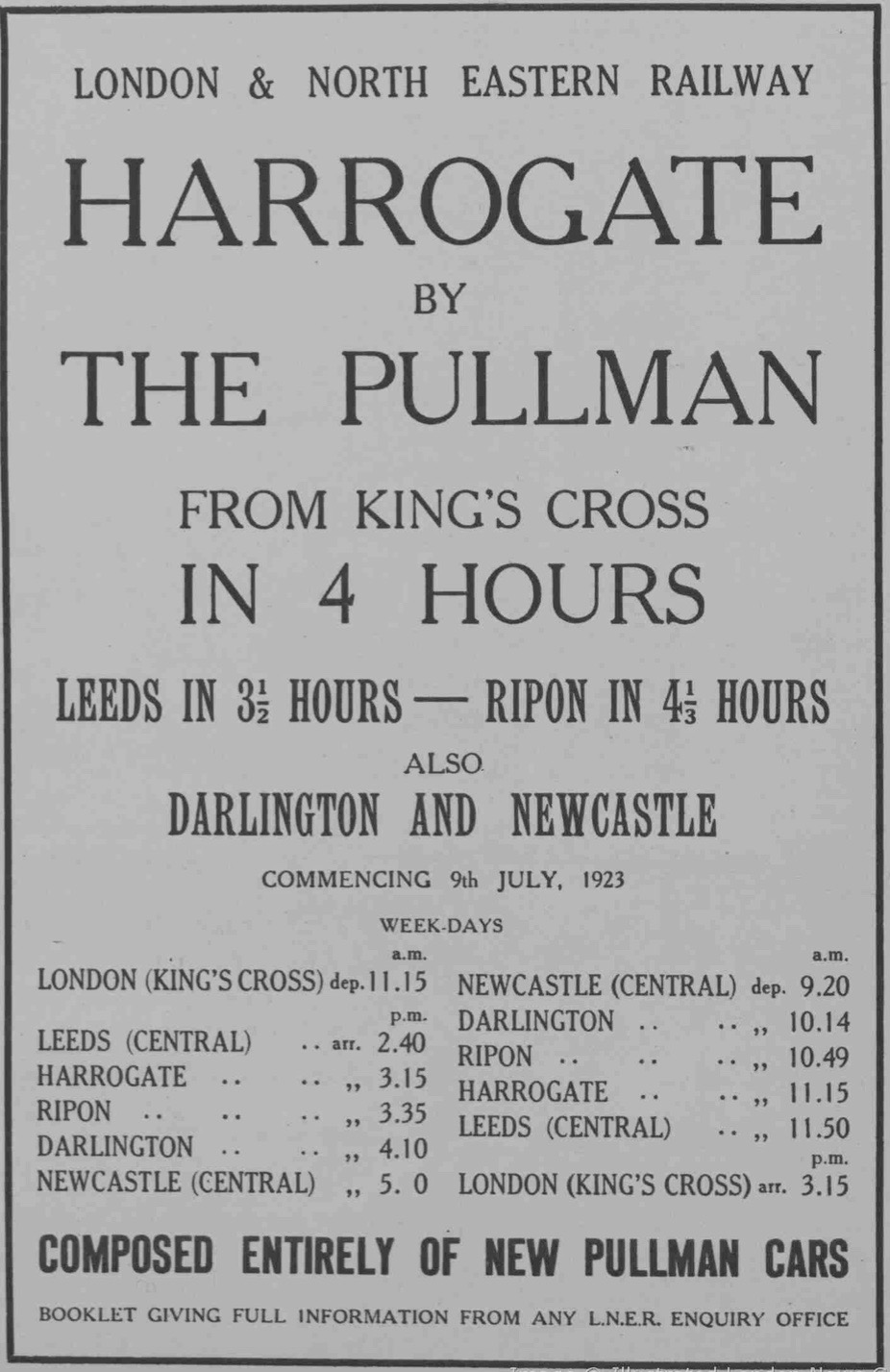
- Advert from the Illustrated London News, 14 July 1923.

Overview
- Service type: Passenger train
- First service: 9 July 1923
- Last service: 1928
- Successor: West Riding Pullman
- Current operator: London and North Eastern Railway

Route
- Termini: London King's Cross; Newcastle
- Distance travelled: Leeds, Harrogate, Ripon, Darlington
- Service frequency: Daily
- Line used: East Coast Main Line

The Harrogate Pullman was a named passenger train operating in the United Kingdom.

== History ==
The Harrogate Pullman was introduced into service by the London and North Eastern Railway and began operating in 1923 between London King’s Cross and Newcastle, via Harrogate and Ripon.

It comprised 12 new specially-built Pullman cars costing £70,000 (equivalent to £5,040,000 in 2023) for the service. The supplement to travel on the service was 10s 1st class (equivalent to £36.02 in 2023) and 6s 3rd class (equivalent to £21.61 in 2023).

In 1928 it was renamed the West Riding Pullman which in 1935 became the Yorkshire Pullman.

In 1928 it became Queen of Scots.
