= Brighton Belle =

British luxury train between Brighton and London

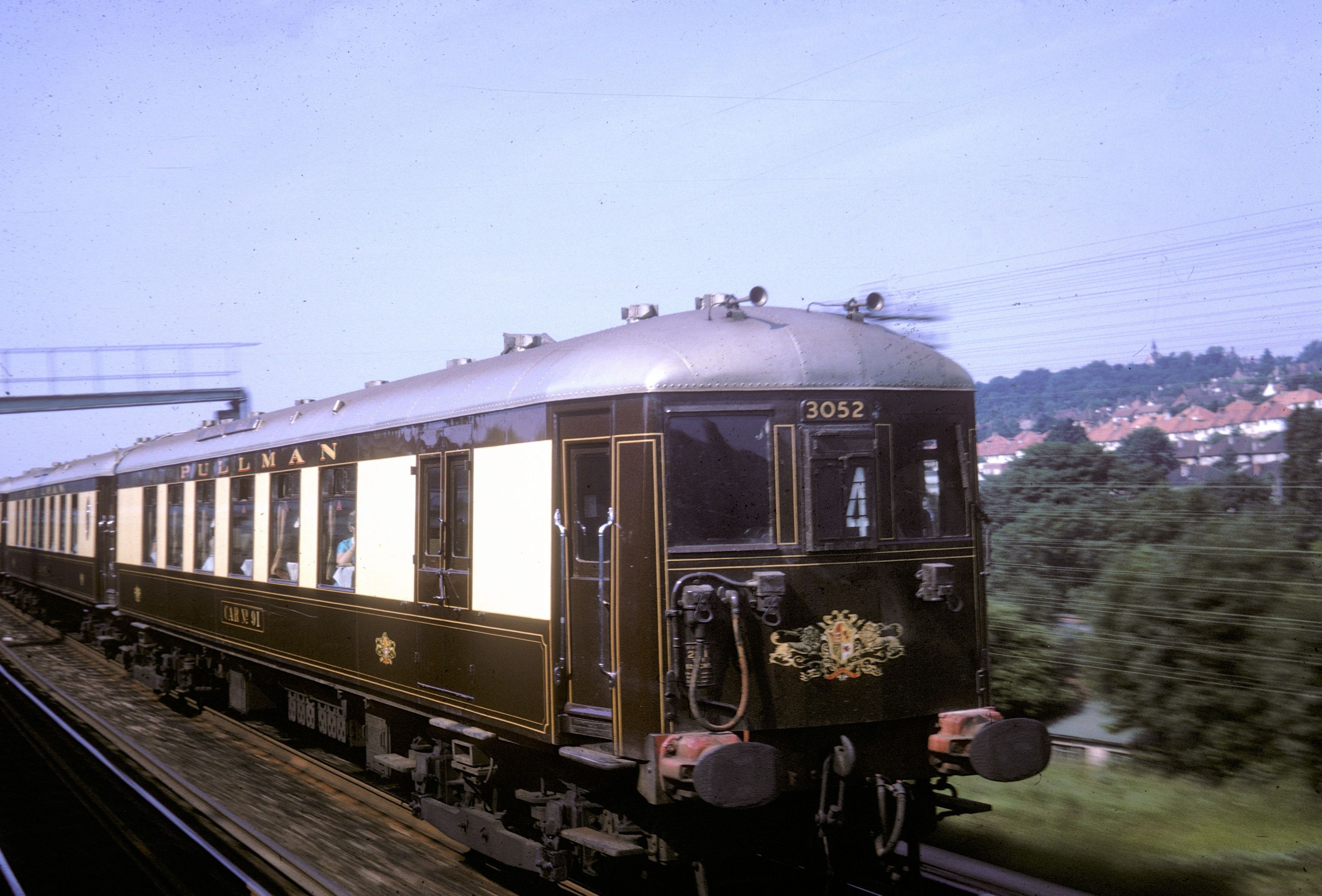
The Brighton Belle passing Purley Oaks at speed in June 1964.

The Brighton Belle was a named train which was operated by the Southern Railway and subsequently by British Railways from Victoria Station in London to Brighton, on the Sussex coast. Commissioned as the flagship of the Southern Railway's mass electrification project, which commenced in January 1931, the world's only electric all-Pullman service ran daily between London Victoria and Brighton from 1 January 1933 until 30 April 1972.

== History ==
The London, Brighton and South Coast Railway (LB&SCR) began using Pullman cars in its express trains in 1875, and in December 1881 they introduced the first all-Pullman train in the UK. Known as the Pullman Limited, this ran between London Victoria and Brighton via Horsham and subsequently ordinary rolling stock was added to the service. In 1888 a second all-Pullman service was instituted, using cars lit by electricity and designed by William Stroudley.

The LB&SCR was the origin of the British umber and cream Pullman livery. In 1903 R. J. Billinton changed the colour of the ordinary LB&SCR coaches to umber brown with white or cream upper panels, and in 1906 this colour scheme was also adopted by the Pullman Car Co., with the name of the car in large gilt letters on the lower panel and flanked on each side by a coloured transfer of the Pullman Company's crest.

Another all-Pullman service was introduced in 1908 under the name of the Southern Belle. Contemporary advertising by the LB&SCR claimed that this was "... the most luxurious train in the world...". In 1908 this could be experienced for a special London Victoria to Brighton day return fare of 12 shillings, a premium rate at a time when average earnings were around £1 a week (or 20 shillings). The Southern Belle was steam-hauled until 1 January 1933, when electric units were introduced. Trial trains had commenced running between London and Brighton on 2 November 1932, using an experimental five-coach unit (No. 2001) and examples of the new rolling stock were exhibited at London Victoria and Brighton stations from 29 December 1932. With the arrival of the mid-day Victoria to Brighton service at Brighton Station on 29 June 1934, the Mayor of Brighton, Margaret Hardy, renamed the train the Brighton Belle, and it retained this title until withdrawal. The service was scheduled to take 60 minutes for the 51-mile (82 km) express journey.

Three five-car all-Pullman electric multiple units designated 5-BEL were commissioned by the Southern Railway as the flagship of the world's then-largest electrification project, which covered over 160 track miles. The 15 cars – built in 1932 by Metropolitan-Cammell at its Saltley works in Birmingham – were operated in trains comprising two units, the remaining unit normally held in reserve. The 'spare' multiple unit set was used for a Sunday Pullman service from Eastbourne, known as the Eastbourne Pullman for much of the 1950s, but this service was discontinued in 1957.

During the Second World War the service was suspended after Unit 3052 was badly damaged by aerial bombing at London Victoria; all cars were placed in safe storage at Crystal Palace (High Level) station, but the service was progressively reinstated in 1946.

In the early 1950s the train was used by the BBC for filming London to Brighton in Four Minutes, a speeded-up version of the journey. The trains were refurbished and overhauled in 1955, but by 1972 the stock was old and rode poorly by contemporary standards. Despite protests, the decision was taken to not replace the rolling stock and the service was withdrawn on 30 April 1972. Every car was preserved, in most cases to meet the ambitions of major breweries to 'bolt on' Pullman restaurants to pubs and hotels, although most were removed relatively quickly because of the high cost of maintenance and refurbishment. A number were progressively acquired by the Venice Simplon Orient Express, while one still remains in use as B&B accommodation at the Little Mill Inn, Rowarth, Derbyshire. Motor brake car 90 was used for passenger service on the Nene Valley Railway between 1980 and 1990, but was subsequently moved in early 1991 to the former Steamtown Depot at Carnforth for a 5-year restoration project, but was scrapped in July 1991 after being gutted by fire caused by an electrical fault.

The Southern ran three Pullman trains with the suffix Belle. The others were the Bournemouth Belle and the Devon Belle. British Railways introduced the Thanet Belle (later renamed the Kentish Belle) in 1948.

== Restoration ==
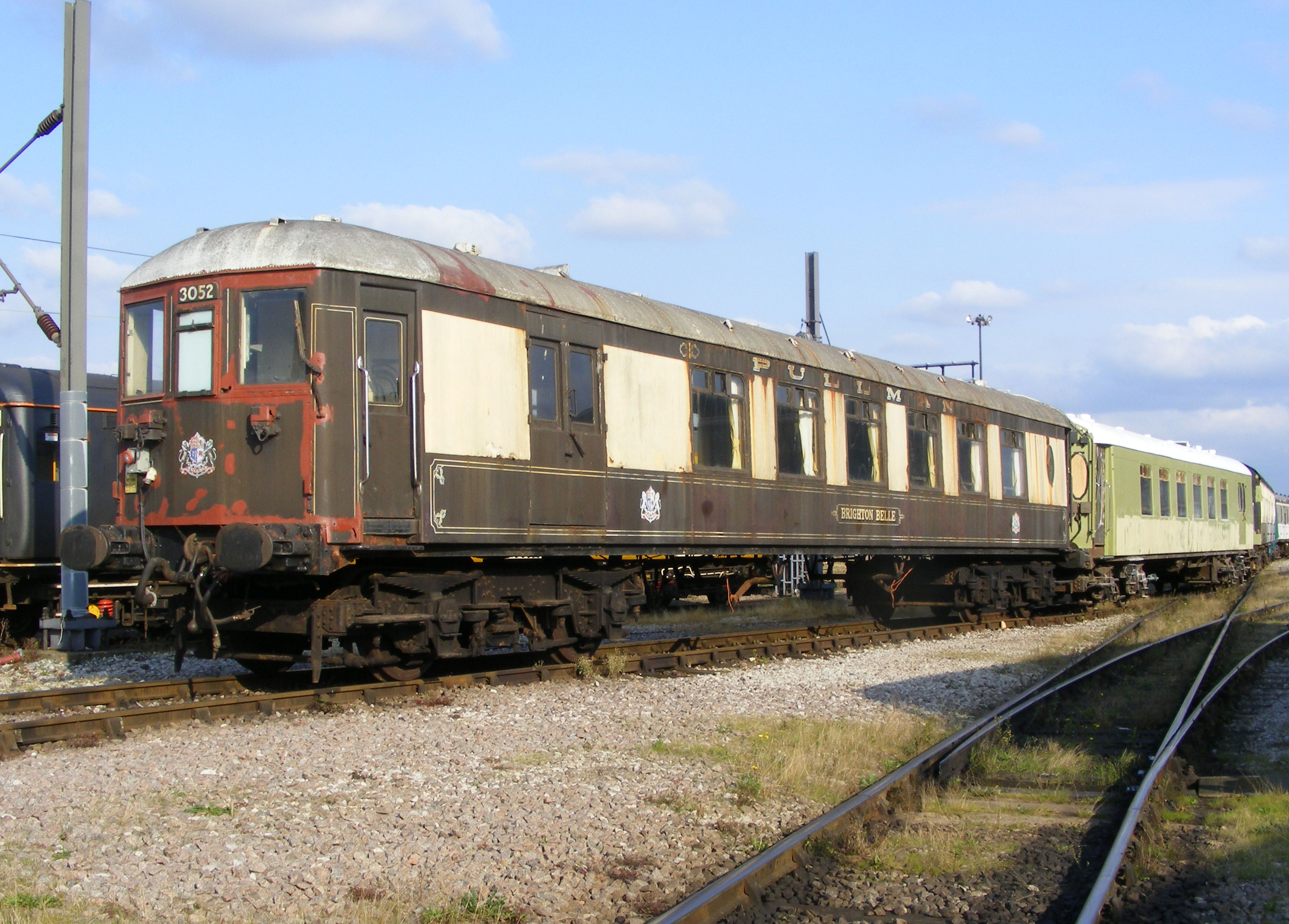
Driving Cars 88 and 91 were coupled together for the very first time when the latter arrived at Rampart of Derby for restoration in September 2009.

A campaign to return the Brighton Belle to mainline service was launched by the 5-BEL Trust in 2009. The trustees had been concerned for some time about the worrying state of electric train preservation in Britain and wanted to raise the profile of the issue and to deal with the issues of financial support and covered accommodation. The project was launched at the National Railway Museum following the acquisition of two of the surviving 14 cars; by early 2009 four out of the five cars needed to form a complete unit had been acquired and the trust had set in place agreements to cover refurbishment of the cars, which began at Pullman restoration specialists Rampart Engineering at the Barrow Hill Engine Shed in February 2009.

When the 5-BEL project is completed, it will be returned to mainline service. Despite the high cost of the restoration (approaching £6 million) the programme is seen as an investment for future generations. Progress with the restoration of the Brighton Belle to mainline use will depend in part on the level of public donations. This is the first time that a complete train will have been restored in Britain. A short train of three cars will undergo mainline proving trials in the near future, with mainline excursions with a four car unit commencing upon testing success. The latest expectation is for testing on the rails in spring 2025 on the Merseyrail network so that charter and public runs might commence a few months after.

== Train unit completed ==
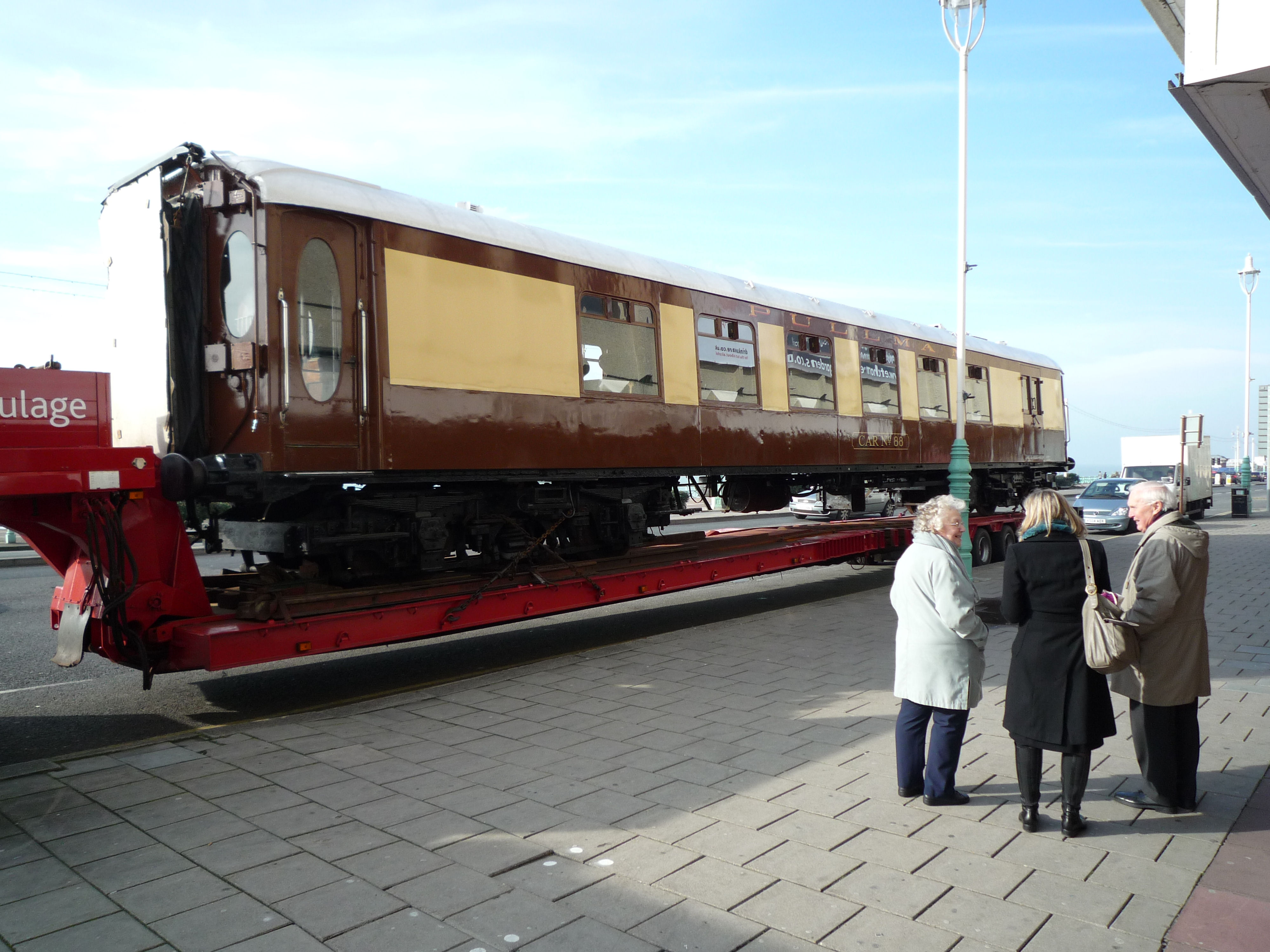
Brighton Belle Car 88 on display in Brighton for the first time in 40 years to celebrate the acquisition of the fifth car needed to form a complete Belle unit.

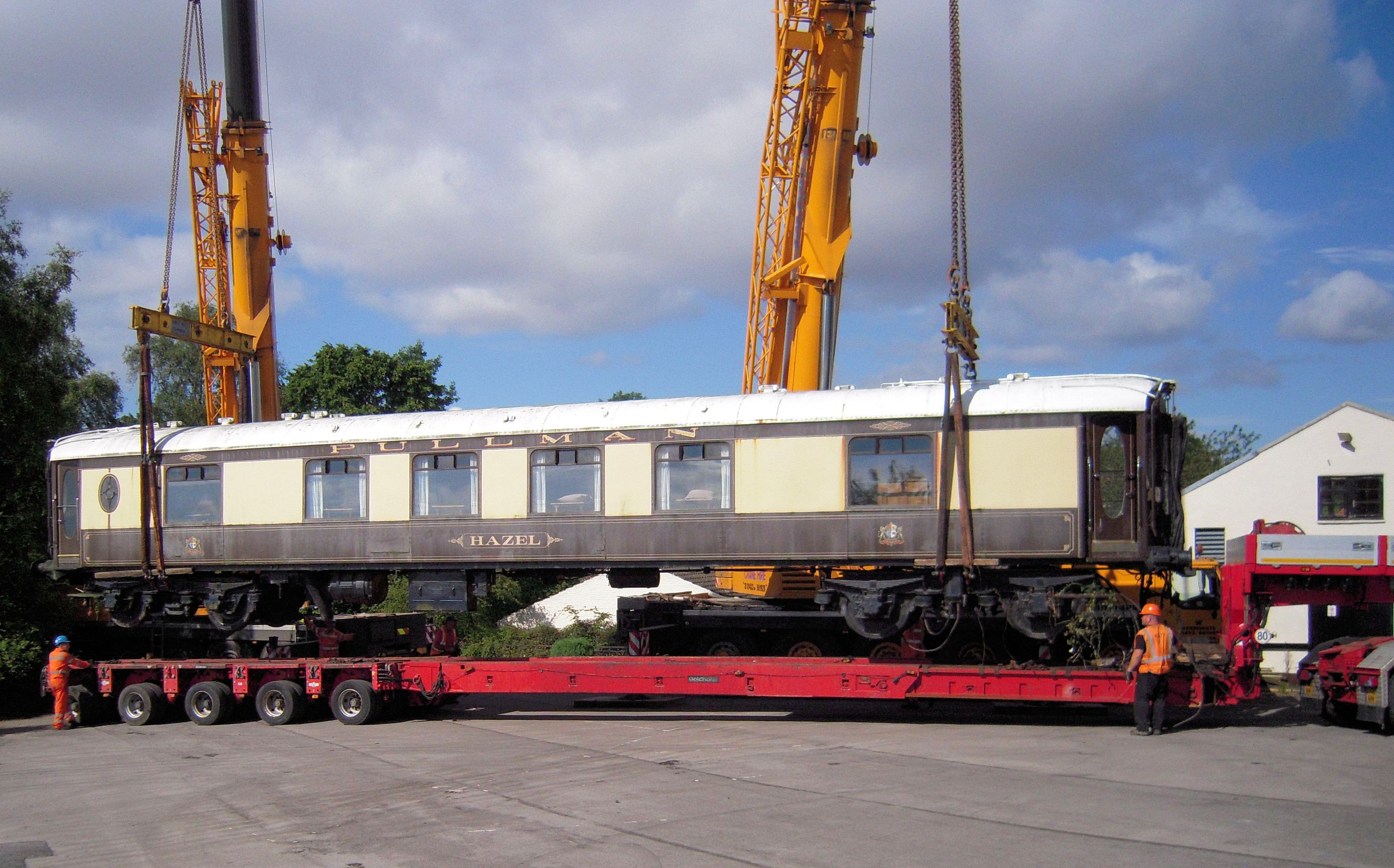
Pullman First Class Car 'Hazel' had been continuously used as a restaurant attached to the 'Black Bull' at Moulton, Yorks, since 1972. It took two enormous mobile cranes to perform the delicate removal operation on 10 August 2012.

During February 2011, Driving Car 88 was displayed on the Brighton seafront to celebrate the acquisition of the Trust's fifth car. The fifth 5BEL car required was Pullman First Doris, then based at the Bluebell Railway for the Bluebell's Pullman rake, and thus a swap was arranged. The 5-BEL Trust had purchased Golden Arrow Pullman Kitchen Car Carina and supplied this to the Bluebell Railway in exchange for Doris, allowing the Bluebell Railway to complete a five-car all-Pullman Golden Arrow rake. Carina is of considerable heritage importance, having formed part of Winston Churchill's funeral train which carried the principal mourners from London to Bladon on 30 January 1965.

The 5-BEL Trust said at the time that acquiring Doris as the trust's fifth car was not only the right move from a heritage standpoint but also it demonstrated the benefits of like-minded organisations working together. The following year, on 6 September 2012, the 5BEL Trust announced that, following two years of complex negotiations with the owners of the Black Bull at Moulton, near Richmond, it had purchased Pullman first 'Hazel' (no. 279) the previous month and had removed the car by road to the Brighton Belle shed at Barrow Hill. The car had been in continuous use as a highly praised restaurant since 1972 and her removal was an extremely delicate operation, involving the use of two of the largest mobile cranes in Britain. The acquisition of a second first class car, originally considered as an impossible outcome, permits the correct unit configuration of two motor brakes, two trailer kitchen firsts and a trailer parlour third, with a trailer held in reserve.

== Brighton mural ==
On 23 September 2010, the then Mayor of Brighton & Hove, Geoffrey Wells, and Sir William McAlpine jointly unveiled a commemorative Brighton Belle street mural. This striking feature has been painted into the arches in Trafalgar Street underneath Brighton Station, and runs along the length of the Brighton Toy and Model Museum.

== See also ==
- List of named passenger trains of the United Kingdom
- Pullman train (UK)
