= The Welshman =

Named British passenger train

Y Cymro – The Welshman
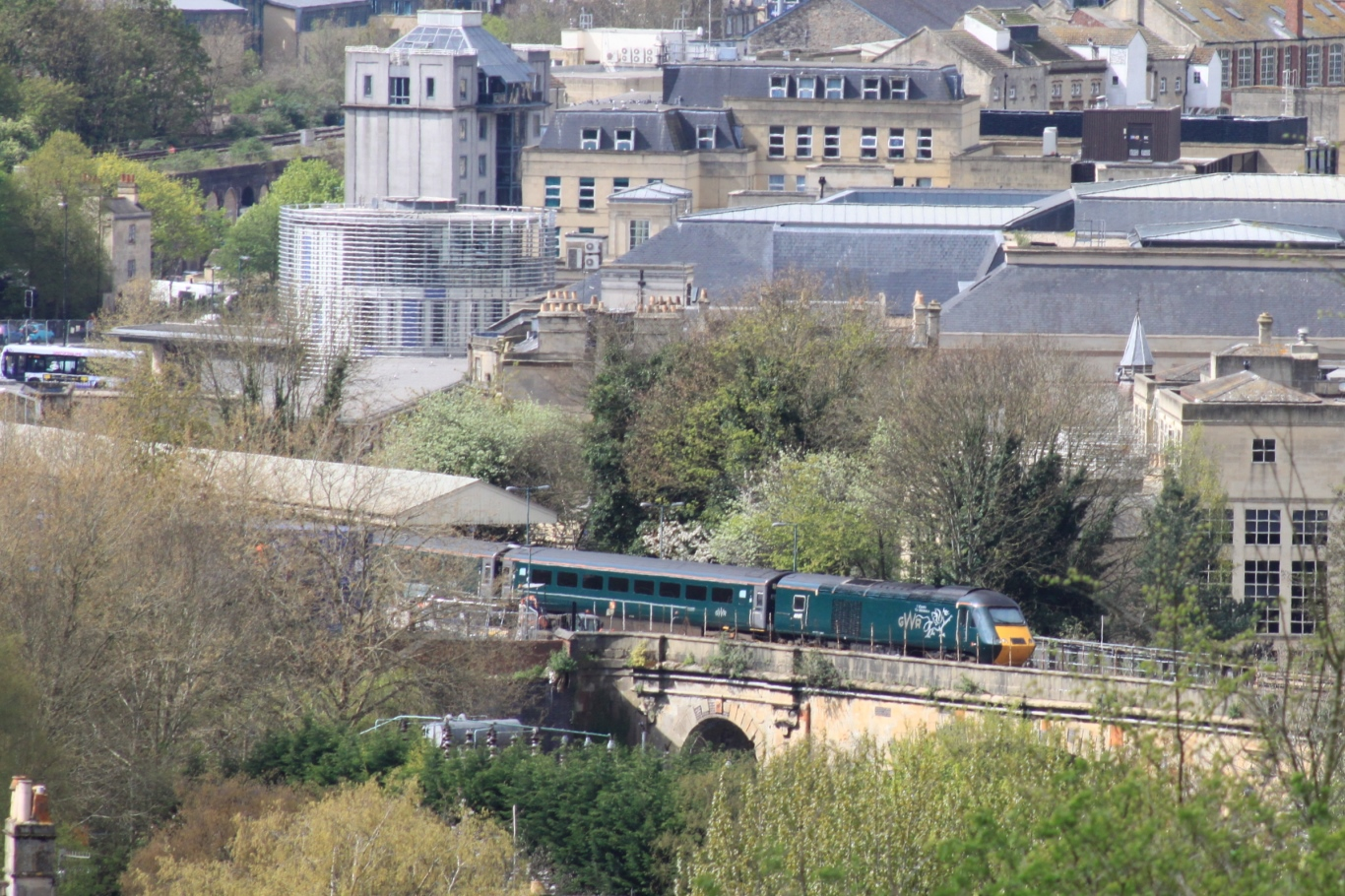
- A GWR InterCity 125 at Bath Spa station wearing the special Y Cymro – The Welshman livery.

Overview
- Service type: Passenger train
- Status: Not in operation.
- First service: 2016
- Last service: 2025
- Former operator: Great Western Railway

Route
- Termini: Swansea; London Paddington
- Service frequency: Weekdays
- Lines used: Great Western; South Wales

On-board services
- Seating arrangements: First & Standard

Technical
- Rolling stock: InterCity 125 (2016–2017); Class 800/3 (2018-present)
- Operating speed: 125 mph

Y Cymro – The Welshman was a named passenger train of the Great Western Railway running between Swansea and London Paddington.

The Welshman was a named passenger train of the London, Midland and Scottish Railway that ran from London Euston Station to Holyhead with portions for Llandudno, Pwllheli and Porthmadog.
