= Golden Hind (passenger train) =

Passenger railway train

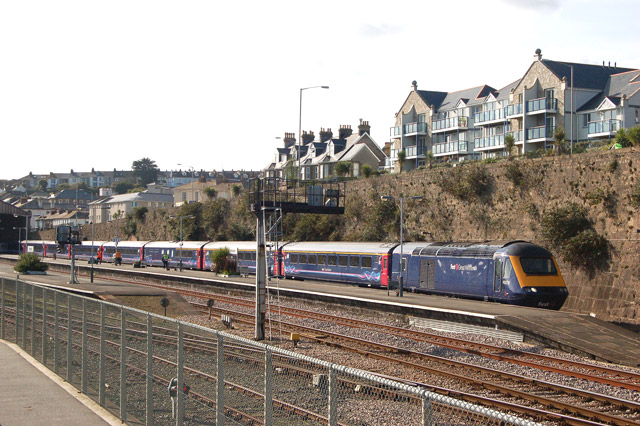
- An InterCity 125 at Penzance similar to that which was used on the Golden Hind

Overview
- Service type: Passenger train
- First service: 15 June 1964
- Current operator: Great Western Railway
- Former operator: British Rail

Route
- Termini: London Paddington; Penzance
- Stops: Main calling points only Reading, Taunton, Exeter St Davids, Newton Abbot, Totnes (westbound only), Plymouth, Liskeard, Bodmin Parkway, Par, St Austell, Truro, Redruth
- Service frequency: Daily

On-board services
- Seating arrangements: First and standard
- Catering facilities: Pullman dining (previous), First Class and Standard trolleys (current)

Technical
- Operating speed: 125 mph
- Timetable numbers: 1A73 Eastbound; 1C92 Westbound

The Golden Hind is a named passenger train operating between London Paddington and Penzance in the United Kingdom. The Golden Hind was first introduced in the summer of 1964; the launch broke the then record for the time of a Plymouth to London journey. The train encouraged one commuter to buy the first ever First Class annual season from Taunton to London Paddington.

== History ==
The Golden Hind was introduced by British Rail on 15 June 1964. The inaugural train was waved off from Paddington by Admiral Sir Royston Wright, Second Sea Lord and the whistle was blown by the Lord Mayor of Plymouth.

The up service departed Plymouth at 07:05, calling at Newton Abbot, Exeter and Taunton, arriving at Paddington at 10:55. The down service was from Paddington at 17:20, calling at the same places and arriving in Plymouth at 21:15. Seven coaches were provided, including a restaurant car, but the introduction of Western diesel locomotives allowed the addition of an extra coach. The provision of this train encouraged a passenger to purchase the first first class season ticket from Taunton to London Paddington.

As of 2017, the Golden Hind is still being run by Great Western Railway as the 05:05 from Penzance to Paddington, returning at 18:03 from Paddington to Penzance.
