= Yorkshire Pullman =

Former named railway service from London King's Cross to Bradford, England

Overview
- Service type: Passenger train
- Predecessor: West Riding Pullman
- First service: 30 September 1935
- Former operator(s): London and North Eastern Railway; British Rail

Route
- Termini: London King's Cross; Harrogate
- Service frequency: Daily
- Line(s) used: East Coast Main Line

The Yorkshire Pullman was a named passenger train operating in the United Kingdom.

== History ==
The service was introduced from the timetable change on 30 September 1935 by the London and North Eastern Railway.

It started life as the Harrogate Pullman Limited in 1923. In 1928 it was renamed the West Riding Pullman and ran between London King's Cross and Newcastle. It was renamed the Yorkshire Pullman in 1935 and terminated at Harrogate, with a through portion for Hull via Doncaster. For Hull it offered a three and a half hour schedule to London. It departed Hull at 11:10 am, and gave a businessman two clear hours in London before returning from King's Cross at 4:45 pm.

In 1937 the service was accelerated with the journey time reduced by 15 minutes.

The service was suspended for the duration of the Second World War and resumed on 4 November 1946. It departed Harrogate at 10:20 am, and arrived at King's Cross at 1:58 pm. The return journey departed King's Cross at 3:50 pm and arrived in Harrogate at 8:20 pm. The service was suspended on 14 February 1947 because of the nationwide fuel crisis and it restarted in October of the same year. The service quickly became popular and by 1950 the demand had led to the train being formed of 11 coaches, with accommodation for 108 first class and 192 third class passengers.

It was withdrawn by British Rail in 1978. In 1995 the name was used for a new service from London King's Cross to Leeds. This survived until 2004.
