= Thanet Belle =

Down 'Thanet Belle' Pullman express hauled by a West Country class locomotive, approaching Bickley Junction, 1950

The Thanet Belle was a named train run by the Southern Region of British Railways from 1948 until it was withdrawn in 1958 due to the electrification of the route. It ran from London Victoria to Margate, Broadstairs and Ramsgate.

The train, composed of Pullman stock, had its origins in the Thanet Pullman Limited, introduced by the South Eastern and Chatham Railway in July 1921 but withdrawn in 1928.

The Thanet Belle was usually hauled by a West Country class or Battle of Britain class locomotive.

From 1951, three coaches were detached at Faversham and ran separately through to Canterbury East, and the name of the whole train was changed to Kentish Belle. The Canterbury service was withdrawn after only one year, but the new name for the train was retained.

The use of the name Kentish Belle was discontinued after 1958 because of the impending completion of the first phase of the "Kent Coast Electrification" in 1959.

== See also ==
List of named passenger trains of the United Kingdom
