= Headboard (train) =

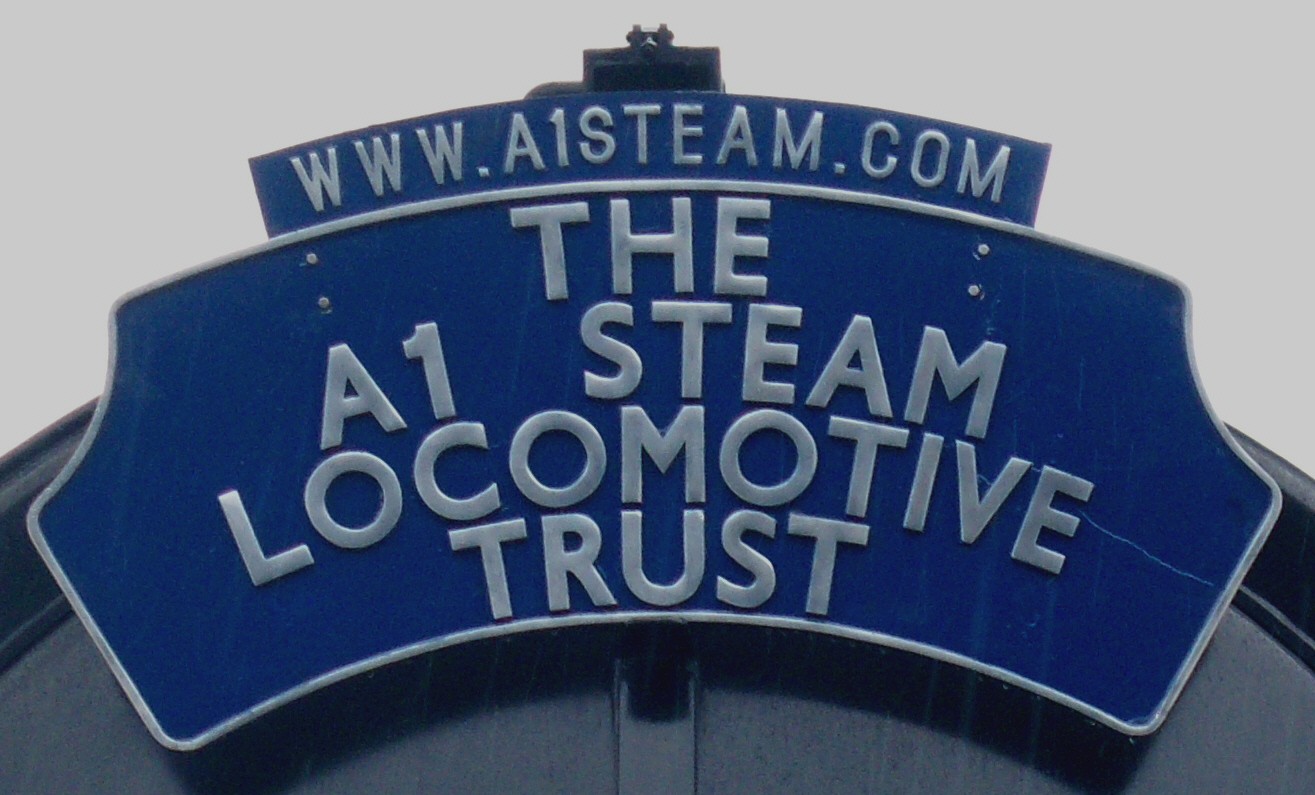
A1 Steam Locomotive Trust headboard on Tornado

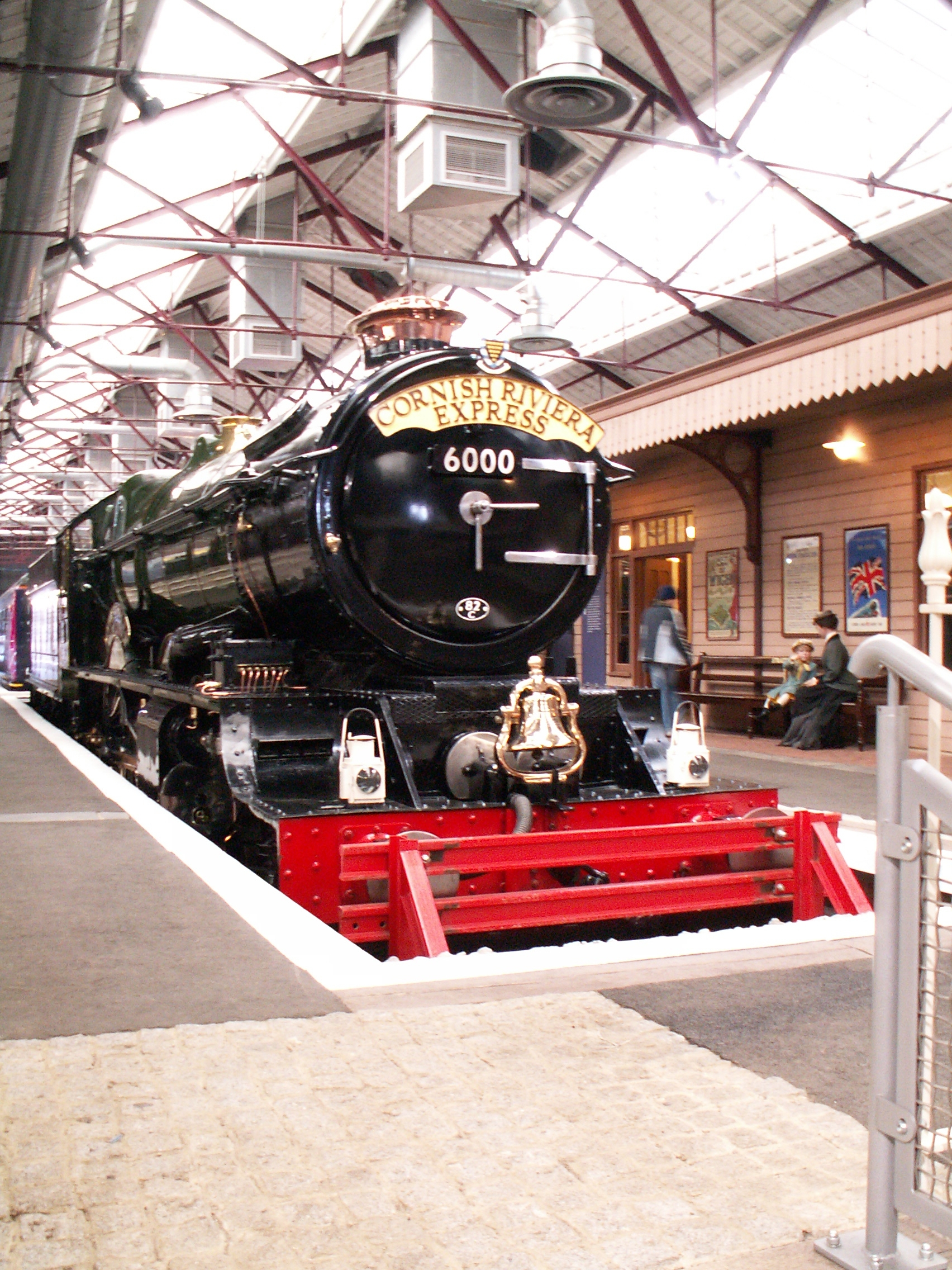
Cornish Riviera Express headboard fitted to King George V

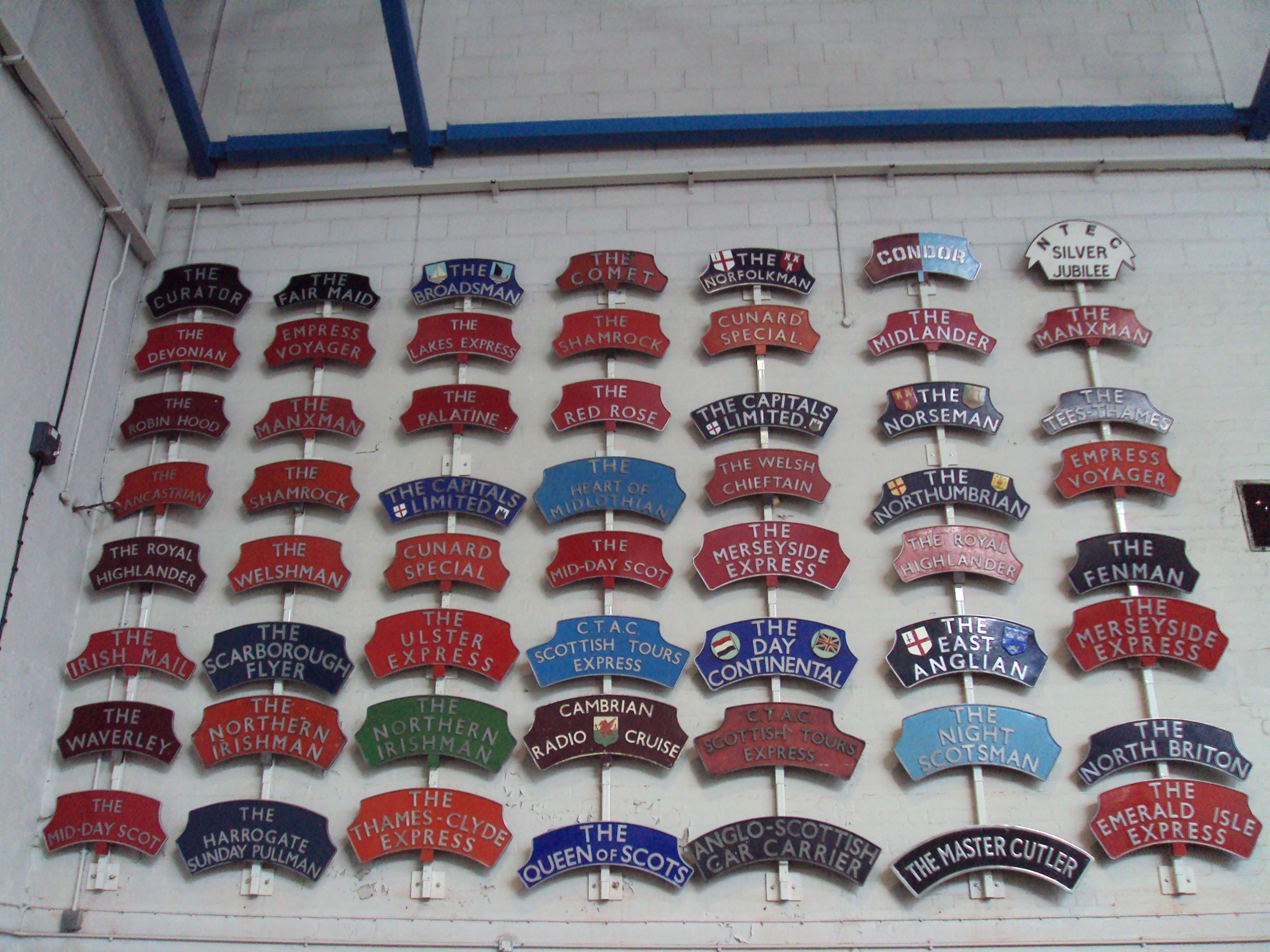
Train headboards at the National Railway Museum, York

A headboard is a board hung on the front of a locomotive. Generally it can depict a named train. Headboards are distinct from locomotive nameplates.

In the United Kingdom, headboards were common on the public railway in the age of steam and into the age of diesel and electric trains, although in modern times, use of headboards on scheduled trains is now defunct, although headboards are often still used on the occasion of a "last train", such as the withdrawal of a particular class of locomotive. On the scheduled network, headboards were used to denote special named trains, such as luxury Pullmans, blue riband expresses or other once-a-day special services such as boat trains. Latterly, headboards are still used by railtour companies for rail enthusiast's excursions, to denote the name of a tour, or more generally the name of the organisation running a tour. Headboards are also frequently used on heritage railway line services to denote special trains, the name of the railway, a locomotive's anniversary, or events.

Common practice in the UK is to display the headboard on the front of a locomotive (temporarily attached, to denote the name of the train or other purpose), and to have the nameplate of the locomotive on the side of the locomotive (permanently attached to denote the name of the locomotive). Confusion may have arisen over the example of the "Flying Scotsman" — where The Flying Scotsman is a famous named train service operating since 1862, after which a now famous locomotive, the 1923 built No. 4472 Flying Scotsman was named — while the Flying Scotsman headboard has been worn by many different locomotives over the years, when No. 4472 was running the service for which it was built, this would give rise to No. 4472 displaying the name Flying Scotsman on both the front and the side of the locomotive.

== See also ==
- Drumhead, a sign hung on the rear of named U.S. trains.
- List of named passenger trains of the United Kingdom — many of these trains would have run with a headboard fitted
