= Preserved British Pullman carriages =

These British Pullman carriages are preserved, or have continued to operate on the main line beyond their original service life:

== Early Pullman cars ==
Early Pullman cars
Origin	Number	Name	Type	Manufacturer	Year	Location	Owner	Photograph
MR	—	Ariel	Parlour First	Pullman, USA	1876	Selsey	—	
MR	—	Ariel	Body only, Now a house					
MR	1–4	—	Clerestory third Baggage	Pullman, USA	—	Midland Railway – Butterley	Midland Railway trust	
MR	1–4	—	Grounded body only					
MR	21	—	Clerestory Sleeping/Day Car	Pullman, USA	—	Midland Railway – Butterley	Midland Railway Trust	
MR	21	—	Grounded body only					
LBSCR	—	Princess Ena	Kitchen First	Brighton	1906	Petworth	Old Station Petworth	
LBSCR	—	Princess Ena	Under restoration at The Old Railway Station B & B, Petworth					
GNR	—	Dunrobin	Clerestory Day / Sleeping car	Pullman Car Company	1882	Embsay	—	
GNR	—	Dunrobin	Used on Great Northern Railway. Body only in remnants as parts for Balmoral.					
MR	GNR3	Balmoral	Clerestory Day/Sleeping Car	Pullman, Detroit/Derby	1882	Embsay	Stephen Middleton	
MR	GNR3	Balmoral	One of four built. Sold to the Midland Railway where it was put onto a 6-wheel underframe. Later worked for GNR on the East Coast Main Line, later bought by the Highland Railway, where given bogies circa 1895. Withdrawn 1907. Eventually went to Brighton in 1918 where it was added to a home for the family of Mr Marks, the Superintendent of the Pullman Car Company, using spare parts from Pullman car Dunrobin and bogies and a few other parts from a scrapped LMS Scenery Van from the Foxfield Railway.					
SER	88	Dolphin	First Parlour	Gilbert Car Company	1891	Selsey	—	
SER	88	Dolphin	Body only, now a house					
SECR	90	Figaro	Baggage car	Gilbert Car Company	1892	Selsey	—	
SECR	90	Figaro	Body only, now a house					
SER	79	Mabel	First Parlour	Metro Carriage Wagon	1897	Selsey	—	
SER	79	Mabel	Body only, now a house					
SER	77	Dora	First Parlour	Midland Carriage Wagon	1897	Selsey	—	
SER	77	Dora	Body only, now a house					
SER	76	Venus II	First Parlour	Metro Carriage Wagon	1897	Selsey	—	
SER	76	Venus II	Body only, now a house					
SER	75	Hilda	First Kitchen	Jackson & Sharp, USA	1897	Selsey	—	
SER	75	Hilda	Body only, now a house					
SER	72	Tulip	First Parlour	Jackson & Sharp, USA	1897	Selsey	—	
SER	72	Tulip	Body only, now a house					

== Pullman 1910–1922 cars ==
1910–1922 cars for service on London, Brighton and South Coast Railway and South Eastern and Chatham Railway
Origin	Number	Name	Type	Manufacturer	Year	Location	Owner	Photograph
SECR	32	Emerald (1st)	Kitchen First	BRCW	1910	Conwy Valley	Conwy Valley Railway	
SECR	32	Emerald (1st)	Awaiting Restoration					
SECR	43	Sapphire	Parlour First	BRCW	1910	Barrow Hill	Folkestone Harbour Company	
SECR	43	Sapphire	For Sale by tender, January 2017. Built with wooden frames and bogies, which would preclude running above 25 mph Intended to become a restaurant at the former Folkestone Harbour railway station.					
SECR	47	Alicante	Kitchen First	Cravens	1912	Petworth	Old Station Petworth	
SECR	47	Alicante	Restored, now Bed and Breakfast accommodation.					
SECR	50	Mimosa	Kitchen First	BRCW	1914	Petworth	Old Station Petworth	
SECR	50	Mimosa	Restored, now Bed and Breakfast accommodation.					
SECR	59	Topaz	Parlour First	BRCW	1914	NRM York	National Railway Museum	
SECR	59	Topaz	Operational					
SECR	92	Malaga	Parlour First (12 wheel)	Pullman, Longhedge	1921	Shepperton	Ian Allan Publishing	
SECR	92	Malaga	Directors and visitors dining room					
SECR	99	Padua	Parlour First (12 wheel)	BRCW	1920	Barrow Hill	Folkestone Harbour Company	
SECR	99	Padua	For Sale by tender, January 2017. Built with wooden frames and bogies, which may preclude running above 25 mph Intended to become a restaurant at the former Folkestone Harbour railway station.					
SECR	102	Rosalind	Kitchen First (12 wheel)	BRCW	1921	Barrow Hill	Folkestone Harbour Company	
SECR	102	Rosalind	For Sale by tender, January 2017. Built with wooden frames and bogies, which may preclude running above 25 mph Intended to become a restaurant at the former Folkestone Harbour railway station.					
LBSCR	113	Car 13	Kitchen Third rebuilt Observation Car	Clayton Wagons Ltd	1921	Paignton and Dartmouth Steam Railway	Dart Valley Railway plc	
LBSCR	113	Car 13	Operational					
LBSCR	114	Car 14	Kitchen Third rebuilt Observation Car	Clayton Wagons Ltd	1921	Swanage Railway	Swanage Railway	
LBSCR	114	Car 14	Operational					
SECR	135	Elimira	Kitchen First	Clayton Wagons Ltd	1921	Ravenglass	Ravenglass and Eskdale Railway	
SECR	135	Elimira	Under Restoration					
SECR	136	Formosa	Kitchen First	Clayton Wagons Ltd	1921	Portsmouth Arms	—	
SECR	136	Formosa	Under Restoration					
SECR	137	Maid of Kent (1st)	Kitchen First	Clayton Wagons Ltd	1921	Ravenglass	Ravenglass and Eskdale Railway	
SECR	137	Maid of Kent (1st)	Under Restoration					

== Pullman 1923–1931 cars ==
1923–1931 cars for service on Southern Railway, London and North Eastern Railway and Great Western Railway
Origin	Number	Name	Type	Manufacturer	Year	Location	Owner	Photograph
SR	154	Flora	Guard Parlour First	BRCW	1923	Petworth	Old Station Petworth	Pullman car Flora at Petworth Old Railway Station B&B
SR	154	Flora	Restored, now Bed and Breakfast accommodation.					Pullman car Flora at Petworth Old Railway Station B&B
SR	156	Montana	Guard Parlour First	BRCW	1923	Petworth	Old Station Petworth	Pullman car Montana at Petworth Old Railway Station B&B
SR	156	Montana	Restored, now Bed and Breakfast accommodation.					Pullman car Montana at Petworth Old Railway Station B&B
LNER	157	Car 54	Brake Parlour Third	Clayton Wagons Ltd	1923	Bluebell Railway	Bluebell Railway	
LNER	157	Car 54	Restored to service, with wheelchair access, 22 March 2024					
SR	175	Fingall	Kitchen First	BRCW	1924	Bluebell Railway	Bluebell Railway	
SR	175	Fingall	Operational					
SR	184	Theodora	Kitchen First	Metropolitan	1926	Kent and East Sussex Railway	Kent and East Sussex Railway	
SR	184	Theodora	Operational.					
SR	185	Barbara	Kitchen First	Metropolitan	1926	Kent and East Sussex Railway	Kent and East Sussex Railway	
SR	185	Barbara	Operational.					
SR	194	Car 36	Parlour Brake Third	BRCW	1926	Bluebell Railway	Private individual	
SR	194	Car 36	Awaiting Restoration					
LNER	208	Car 208	Parlour Third	Midland RC&W	1927	Galway	Gleno Abbey Hotel	
LNER	208	Car 208	Awaiting Restoration; ex-Leona (2nd); Grounded Body and only surviving Pullman coach in Ireland					
LNER	213	Minerva (3rd)	Parlour First	Midland RC&W	1927	Stewarts Lane	VSOE Pullman	
LNER	213	Minerva (3rd)	Operational					
LNER	219	Car 64	Parlour Third	Metropolitan	1928	Bluebell Railway	Bluebell Railway	
LNER	219	Car 64	Operational; named Christine					
LNER	228	Car 75	Parlour Third	Metropolitan	1928	Hilderstone	Spot Gate Inn	
LNER	228	Car 75	Built into restaurant since 1967					
LNER	229	Car 76	Parlour Third	Metropolitan	1928	Carnforth MPD		
LNER	229	Car 76	Awaiting Overhaul; named Lillian					
LNER	232	Car 79 (2nd)	Brake Parlour Third	Metropolitan	1928	North Yorkshire Moors Railway	North Yorkshire Moors Railway	
LNER	232	Car 79 (2nd)	Operational					
LNER	238	Phyllis	Kitchen First	Metropolitan	1928	Stewarts Lane	VSOE Pullman	
LNER	238	Phyllis	Awaiting Restoration					
LNER	239	Agatha	Parlour First	Metropolitan	1928	Stewarts Lane	VSOE Pullman	
LNER	239	Agatha	Awaiting Restoration					
LNER	242	Ursula	Parlour First	Metropolitan	1928	Hilderstone	Spot Gate Inn	
LNER	242	Ursula	Built into restaurant since 1967					
LNER	243	Lucille	Parlour First	Metropolitan	1928	Stewarts Lane	VSOE Pullman	
LNER	243	Lucille	Operational					
CIWL	245	Ibis	Kitchen First	BRCW	1925	Stewarts Lane	VSOE Pullman	
CIWL	245	Ibis	Operational					
CIWL	246	Lydia	Kitchen First	BRCW	1925	South Devon Railway	Private individual	
CIWL	246	Lydia	Under restoration					
CIWL	247	Isle of Thanet	Guard Parlour First	BRCW	1925	Kent & East Sussex Railway	Kent & East Sussex Railway	
CIWL	247	Isle of Thanet	Awaiting overhaul					
GWR	254	Zena	Parlour First	Metropolitan	1928	Stewarts Lane	VSOE Pullman	
GWR	254	Zena	Operational					
GWR	255	Ione	Kitchen First	Metropolitan	1928	Stewarts Lane	VSOE Pullman	
GWR	255	Ione	Operational					
LNER	261	Car 83	Parlour Third	BRCW	1930–31	Keighley and Worth Valley Railway	VSOE Pullman	
LNER	261	Car 83	Operational					
LNER	262	Car 84	Parlour Third	BRCW	1930–31	Keighley and Worth Valley Railway	Keighley and Worth Valley Railway	
LNER	262	Car 84	Operational; named Mary					

== Pullman 1932 cars ==
1932 Metro-Cammell electric multiple units
Origin	Number	Name	Type	Location	Owner	Photograph
SR	264	Ruth	Kitchen Composite	Stewarts Lane	VSOE UK Pullman	
SR	264	Ruth	Awaiting Restoration, Originally with 6-PUL set 3017, later 3042			
SR	278	Bertha	Kitchen Composite	Carnforth	West Coast Railway Company	
SR	278	Bertha	Operational, Originally with 6-PUL set 3012, later 3001			
SR	279	Hazel	Kitchen First	Barrow Hill Engine Shed	5-BEL Trust	
SR	279	Hazel	Awaiting Restoration, Originally with 5-BEL Unit 2051			
SR	280	Audrey	Kitchen First	Stewarts Lane	VSOE UK Pullman	
SR	280	Audrey	Operational, Originally with 5-BEL Unit 2052			
SR	281	Gwen	Kitchen First	Stewarts Lane	VSOE UK Pullman	
SR	281	Gwen	Operational, Originally with 5-BEL Unit 2053			
SR	282	Doris	Kitchen First		5-BEL Trust	
SR	282	Doris	Exchanged for 307 Carina; Originally with 5-BEL Unit 2051			
SR	283	Mona	Kitchen First	Stewarts Lane	VSOE UK Pullman	
SR	283	Mona	Awaiting Restoration, Originally with 5-BEL Unit 2053			
SR	284	Vera	Kitchen First	Stewarts Lane	VSOE UK Pullman	
SR	284	Vera	Operational, Originally with 5-BEL Unit 2052			
SR	285	Car 85	Parlour Third	Barrow Hill Engine Shed	5-BEL Trust	
SR	285	Car 85	Awaiting Restoration, Originally with 5-BEL Unit 2053			
SR	286	Car 86	Parlour Third	Stewarts Lane	VSOE UK Pullman	
SR	286	Car 86	Awaiting Restoration, Originally with 5-BEL Unit 2051			
SR	287	Car 87	Parlour Car	Barrow Hill Engine Shed	5-BEL Trust	
SR	287	Car 87	Awaiting Restoration, Originally with 5-BEL Unit 2052			
SR	288	Car 88	Driving Motor Parlour Third	Barrow Hill Engine Shed	5-BEL Trust	
SR	288	Car 88	Awaiting Restoration, Originally with 5-BEL Unit 2051			
SR	289	Car 89	Driving Motor Parlour Third	Fen Drayton	Carriages of Cambridge	
SR	289	Car 89	Originally with 5-BEL Unit 2051 Formerly located at Little Mill Inn, Derbyshire. Sold to Carriages of Cambridge and moved to new location in June 2023.			
SR	291	Car 91	Driving Motor Brake Parlour	Barrow Hill Engine Shed	5-BEL Trust	
SR	291	Car 91	Awaiting Restoration, Originally with 5-BEL Unit 2052			
SR	292	Car 92	Driving Motor Parlour Third	Stewarts Lane	VSOE UK Pullman	
SR	292	Car 92	Awaiting Restoration, Originally with 5-BEL Unit 2053			
SR	293	Car 93	Driving Motor Parlour Third	Stewarts Lane	VSOE UK Pullman	
SR	293	Car 93	Awaiting Restoration, Originally with 5-BEL Unit 2053			

== Pullman 1951 cars ==
1951 "Festival of Britain" cars
Origin	Number	Name	Type	Manufacturer	Year	Location	Owner	Photograph
BR(S)	301	Perseus	Parlour First	BRCW	1951	Stewarts Lane	VSOE Pullman	
BR(S)	301	Perseus	Operational					
BR(S)	302	Phoenix	Parlour First	Pullman, Preston Park	1952	Stewarts Lane	VSOE Pullman	
BR(S)	302	Phoenix	Operational					
BR(S)	304	Aries	Kitchen First	Pullman, Preston Park	1952	Kent and East Sussex Railway	Kent and East Sussex Railway	
BR(S)	304	Aries	Under Restoration					
BR(S)	305	Aquila	Kitchen First	BRCW	1951	Garden Park, Hewish, Weston-super-Mare	Carriages Cafe at Hewish	
BR(S)	305	Aquila	Intended for use as static restaurant					
BR(S)	306	Orion	Kitchen First	BRCW	1951	Seaton	Peco	
BR(S)	306	Orion	Static Display / Coffee shop					
BR(S)	307	Carina	Kitchen First	BRCW	1951	Bluebell Railway	Private individual	
BR(S)	307	Carina	Awaiting removal from Bluebell Railway					
BR(S)	308	Cygnus	Parlour First	BRCW	1951	Stewarts Lane	VSOE Pullman	
BR(S)	308	Cygnus	Operational					
BR(S)	310	Pegasus ("The Trianon Bar")	Bar Car	Metro Cammell	1951	Crewe Diesel Depot	Locomotive Services Ltd	
BR(S)	310	Pegasus ("The Trianon Bar")	Operational					

== Pullman 1960 cars ==
Pullman 1960 Metro-Cammell cars
Origin	Number	Name	Type	Location	Owner	Photograph
BR(E)	311	Eagle	Kitchen First	Tyseley	(Previously National Railway Museum)	Met Cam Mk.1 Pullman 'Eagle' at Sheffield Park - September 2000
BR(E)	311	Eagle	Operational; restored as part of the Channel 4 television series Great Rail Restorations with Peter Snow.			Met Cam Mk.1 Pullman 'Eagle' at Sheffield Park - September 2000
BR(E)	313	Finch	Sleeping Car (ex Kitchen First)	Hamilton LMD	Belmond Group	
BR(E)	313	Finch	Operational; rebuilt as sleeping car by Royal Scotsman			
BR(E)	315	Heron	Kitchen First	Carnforth	West Coast Railway Company	
BR(E)	315	Heron	Poor Condition			
BR(E)	316	Magpie	Kitchen First	Hamilton LMD	Private owner	
BR(E)	316	Magpie	Poor Condition			
BR(E)	317	Raven	Dining Car (ex Kitchen First)	Hamilton LMD	Belmond Group	
BR(E)	317	Raven	Operational; rebuilt as dining car by Royal Scotsman			
BR(E)	318	Robin	Kitchen First	North Yorkshire Moors Railway	North Yorkshire Moors Railway	
BR(E)	318	Robin	Operational			
BR(E)	319	Snipe	Observation Car (ex Kitchen First)	Hamilton LMD	Belmond Group	
BR(E)	319	Snipe	Operational; rebuilt as lounge car with open observation platform by Royal Scotsman			
BR(E)	321	Swift	Dining Car (ex Kitchen First)	Hamilton LMD	Belmond Group	
BR(E)	321	Swift	Operational; rebuilt as dining car by Royal Scotsman			
BR(E)	324	Amber	Sleeping Car (ex Parlour First)	Hamilton LMD	Belmond Group	
BR(E)	324	Amber	Operational; rebuilt as sleeping car by Royal Scotsman			
BR(E)	325	Amethyst	Parlour First	Carnforth	West Coast Railway Company	
BR(E)	325	Amethyst	Operational			
BR(E)	326	Emerald (2nd)	Parlour First	Carnforth	West Coast Railway Company	
BR(E)	326	Emerald (2nd)	Operational			
BR(E)	327	Garnet	Parlour First	North Yorkshire Moors Railway	North Yorkshire Moors Railway	
BR(E)	327	Garnet	Operational			
BR(E)	328	Opal	Parlour First	North Yorkshire Moors Railway	North Yorkshire Moors Railway	
BR(E)	328	Opal	Operational			
BR(E)	329	Pearl (2nd)	Sleeping Car (ex Parlour First)	Carnforth	Belmond Group	
BR(E)	329	Pearl (2nd)	Operational; rebuilt as sleeping car by Royal Scotsman			
BR(E)	331	Topaz (2nd)	Sleeping Car (ex Parlour First)	Hamilton LMD	Belmond Group	
BR(E)	331	Topaz (2nd)	Operational; rebuilt as sleeping car by Royal Scotsman			
BR(E)	335	—	Kitchen Second	Tyseley	Birmingham Railway Museum Trust	
BR(E)	335	—	Operational			
BR(E)	337	—	Kitchen Second	Carnforth	Belmond Group	
BR(E)	337	—	Operational			
BR(E)	340	—	Kitchen Second	Hurn	Wadsworth and Co	
BR(E)	340	—	Static use at 'The Avon Causeway' Hotel, former Hurn Station, near Bournemouth.			
BR(E)	347	Diamond	Parlour Second	Carnforth	West Coast Railway Company	
BR(E)	347	Diamond	Operational			
BR(E)	348	Topaz	Parlour Second	Carnforth	West Coast Railway Company	
BR(E)	348	Topaz	Operational			
BR(E)	349	—	Parlour Second	Tyseley	Birmingham Railway Museum	
BR(E)	349	—	Operational			
BR(E)	350	Tanzanite	Parlour Second	Carnforth	West Coast Railway Company	
BR(E)	350	Tanzanite	Operational			
BR(E)	351	Sapphire	Parlour Second	Carnforth	West Coast Railway Company	
BR(E)	351	Sapphire	Operational			
BR(E)	352	Amethyst	Parlour Second	Carnforth	West Coast Railway Company	
BR(E)	352	Amethyst	Operational			
BR(E)	353	—	Parlour Second	Hamilton LMD	Belmond Group	
BR(E)	353	—	Sold in 2025 by Vintage Trains Tyseley, to Belmond for use in the 'Royal Scotsman'.			
BR(E)	354	The Hadrian Bar	Bar Car	Carnforth	West Coast Railway Company	
BR(E)	354	The Hadrian Bar	Operational			

== Pullman 1966 cars ==
Pullman 1966 Pullman cars built at Derby
Origin	Number	Name	Type	Location	Owner	Photograph
British Rail	504	Ullswater	Kitchen First	Carnforth	West Coast Railway Company	
British Rail	504	Ullswater	Operational			
British Rail	506	Windermere	Kitchen First	Carnforth	West Coast Railway Company	
British Rail	506	Windermere	Operational			
British Rail	546	City of Manchester	Parlour First	Carnforth	West Coast Railway Company	
British Rail	546	City of Manchester	Awaiting restoration			
British Rail	548	Grasmere	Parlour First	Carnforth	West Coast Railway Company	
British Rail	548	Grasmere	Operational			
British Rail	549	Bassenthwaite	Parlour First	Carnforth	West Coast Railway Company	
British Rail	549	Bassenthwaite	Operational			
British Rail	550	Rydal Water	Parlour First	Carnforth	West Coast Railway Company	
British Rail	550	Rydal Water	Operational			
British Rail	551	Buttermere	Parlour First	Carnforth	West Coast Railway Company	
British Rail	551	Buttermere	Operational			
British Rail	552	Ennerdale Water	Parlour First	Carnforth	West Coast Railway Company	
British Rail	552	Ennerdale Water	Operational			
British Rail	553	Crummock Water	Parlour First	Carnforth	West Coast Railway Company	
British Rail	553	Crummock Water	Operational			
British Rail	586	Derwent Water	Brake Parlour First	Carnforth	West Coast Railway Company	
British Rail	586	Derwent Water	Operational			

== Pullman 1985 cars ==
Mark 3b carriages built at Derby as Intercity Pullman cars.
Origin	Number	Name	Type	Location	Owner	Photograph
British Rail	11073	William Ewart Gladstone	Pullman First Open	Mid-Norfolk Railway	Mid-Norfolk Railway; Preservation Trust (MNRPT)	
British Rail	11073	William Ewart Gladstone	Name carried when in use on Manchester Pullman. Refurbished by Greater Anglia. Preserved on the Mid-Norfolk Railway following withdrawal. Operational			
British Rail	11080	Emmeline Pankhurst	Pullman First Open	Mid-Norfolk Railway	MNRPT	
British Rail	11080	Emmeline Pankhurst	Name carried when in use on Manchester Pullman. Refurbished by Greater Anglia. Preserved on the Mid-Norfolk Railway following withdrawal. Operational			
British Rail	11081	Elizabeth Gaskell	Pullman First Open	Mid-Norfolk Railway	MNRPT	
British Rail	11081	Elizabeth Gaskell	Name carried when in use on Manchester Pullman. Refurbished by Greater Anglia. Preserved on the Mid-Norfolk Railway following withdrawal. Operational			
British Rail	11082	James Joule	Pullman First Open	Barry Tourist Railway	Barry Rail Centre	
British Rail	11082	James Joule	Name carried when in use on Manchester Pullman. Refurbished by Greater Anglia. Preserved on the Barry Tourist Railway following withdrawal. Operational			
British Rail	11085	Sir John Barbirolli	Pullman First Open	Mid-Norfolk Railway	MNRPT	
British Rail	11085	Sir John Barbirolli	Name carried when in use on Manchester Pullman. Refurbished by Greater Anglia including fitting with accessible toilet facilities. Preserved on the Mid-Norfolk Railway following withdrawal. Operational			

== See also ==
- George Pullman
- Pullman Company (USA)
- GWR Super Saloons
- Clerestory, Wikipedia article on Railway Coach roof design following the Pullman American influence.
