= Manchester Pullman =

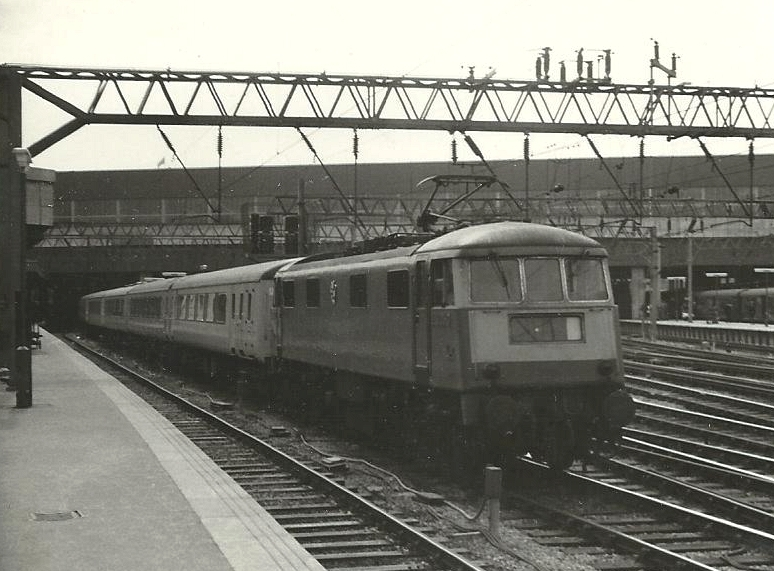
- The Manchester Pullman leaving Euston in July 1966

Overview
- Service type: Passenger train
- First service: 1966
- Last service: 1997
- Former operator(s): British Rail

Route
- Termini: London Euston; Manchester
- Service frequency: Daily
- Line(s) used: West Coast Main Line

Technical
- Operating speed: 100 miles per hour (160 km/h); 110 miles per hour (180 km/h) (After 1985)

The Manchester Pullman was a first-class-only Pullman passenger train operated by British Rail, targeted at business travellers. The service began in 1966, operating between Manchester Piccadilly and London Euston, and offered an at-seat restaurant service to all passengers. It was hauled by 25 kV AC electric locomotives between the British Rail Class 81 and British Rail Class 86 range. The rolling stock had several peculiarities, one being it had the vacuum brake system, so it could not be hauled by the British Rail Class 87 when they were introduced during the later life of the train as they were air brake only locomotives. It replaced the Midland Pullman (operated by the diesel Blue Pullman units) upon completion of the electrification of the West Coast Main Line. There was also a 'sister' Liverpool Pullman service that ran between London Euston and Liverpool Lime Street.

The train consisted of purpose-built British Rail Mark 2 carriages in a special Pullman livery, pearl grey with blue window surrounds (a reversal of the normal British Rail InterCity livery of the period). Some of the other peculiarities included that the coaches featured inward opening doors, to avoid inadvertently opening during the journey, they were fitted with internal locks for additional safety. There were two sets (rakes) of trains, a London and Manchester based train, the London being a slightly longer formation than the Manchester-based one. Each train operated an outward journey in the morning and a return in the evening, thus being at its base each night and weekend. The trains were occasionally used at weekends for premium charter services. London to Manchester trains can be routed via Crewe or Stoke-on-Trent, the Pullmans served Watford Junction, Wilmslow and Stockport, so were all routed via Crewe. Another peculiarity for inter-city trains of that time was that some of the Pullmans were routed via the Styal Line thus precluding a Stockport station stop.

For a while in the late 1970s, the Manchester Pullman was the only remaining regular Pullman service in Britain. The rolling stock eventually came to be seen as dated, and in its later life could not be hauled by Class 87 locomotives because the rolling stock had no air-braking. In May 1985 it was therefore replaced with Mark 3 stock, when non-Pullman standard-class coaches were also added. This was part of a revival of the Pullman brand by InterCity, with Merseyside and Yorkshire services being launched on the same day.

After the withdrawal of the East Coast Pullman trains, the Manchester Pullman once again remained as the only Pullman train on British Rail. The West Coast Main Line InterCity services were taken over by Virgin Trains in 1997 and the Manchester Pullman name was dropped.
