= Birmingham Pullman =

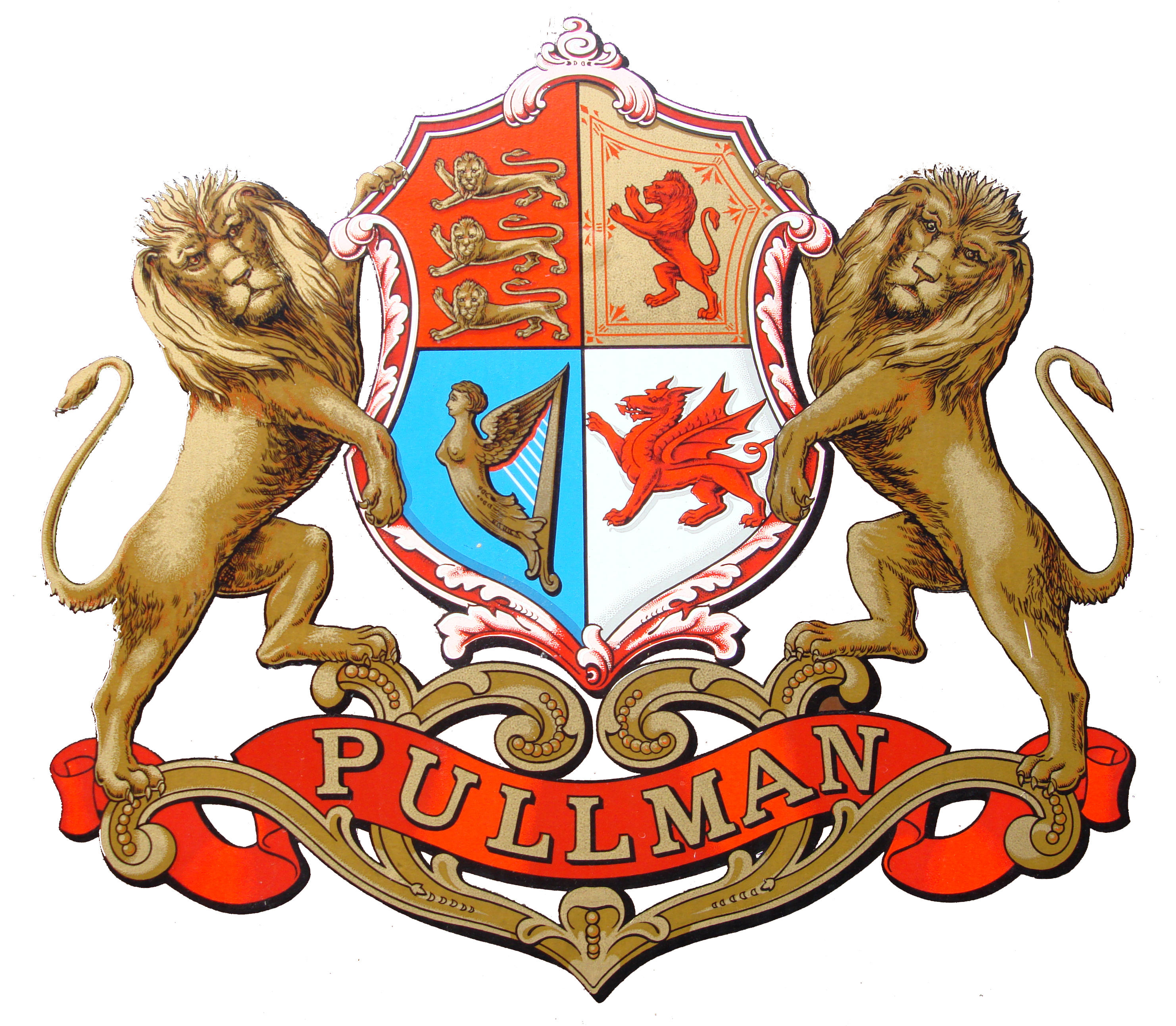

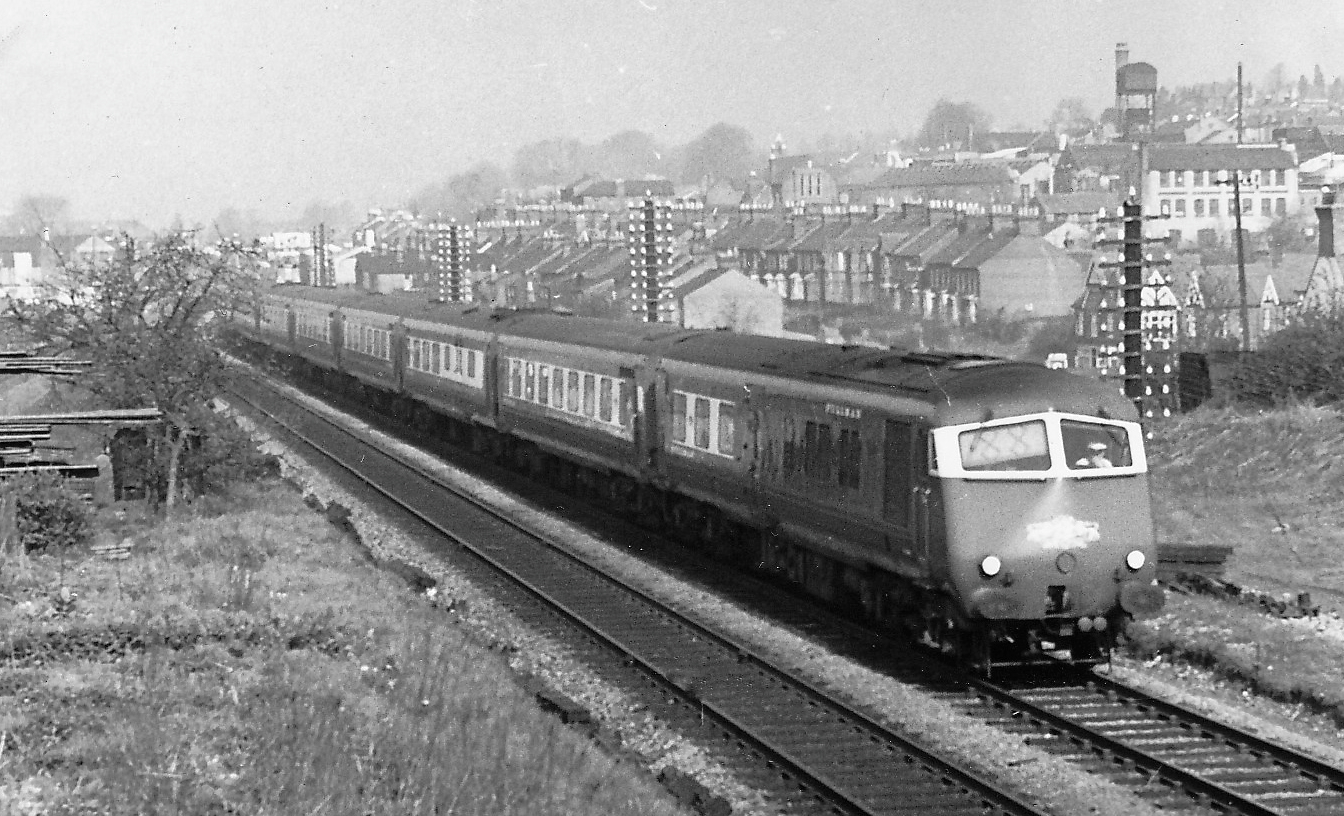
- The Birmingham Pullman passing High Wycombe in 1962

Overview
- Service type: Passenger train
- First service: 12 September 1960
- Last service: 1966
- Former operator(s): British Rail

Route
- Termini: London Paddington; Wolverhampton Low Level
- Stops: Birmingham Snow Hill
- Service frequency: Daily Monday to Friday

Technical
- Rolling stock: British Rail Classes 251 and 261
- Track gauge: 4 ft 8 1/2 in (1,435 mm)
- Operating speed: 90 mph (145 km/h)

The Birmingham Pullman was a named passenger train operating in the United Kingdom.

== History ==
The Birmingham Pullman was operated by the Blue Pullman and introduced by British Rail on 12 September 1960. Departures from Wolverhampton Low Level station at 7:00 am, with pickups at Birmingham Snow Hill at 7:30 am, Solihull at 7:40 am and Leamington Spa at 8:00 gave an arrival time at London Paddington of 9:35 am. A second departure left Birmingham Snow Hill at 2:30 pm, with an arrival at London Paddington of 4:25 pm.

The return services departed London Paddington at 12:10 pm, arriving in Birmingham Snow Hill at 2:05 pm. The evening train left Paddington at 4:50 pm and arrived back at Birmingham Snow Hill at 6:55 pm, and Wolverhampton Low Level at 7:20 pm.

On 15 August 1963, a replacement service for the Birmingham Pullman train, hauled by British Rail Class 52 D1040 Western Queen, ran into freight wagons near Solihull, killing all three men in the cab. It was found to be a signaller's error.

With the electrification of the West Coast Main Line in 1966, the service was withdrawn and the trains were transferred to Oxford, Bristol, and South Wales.
