= Pullman train (UK) =

Luxury railway services in the UK

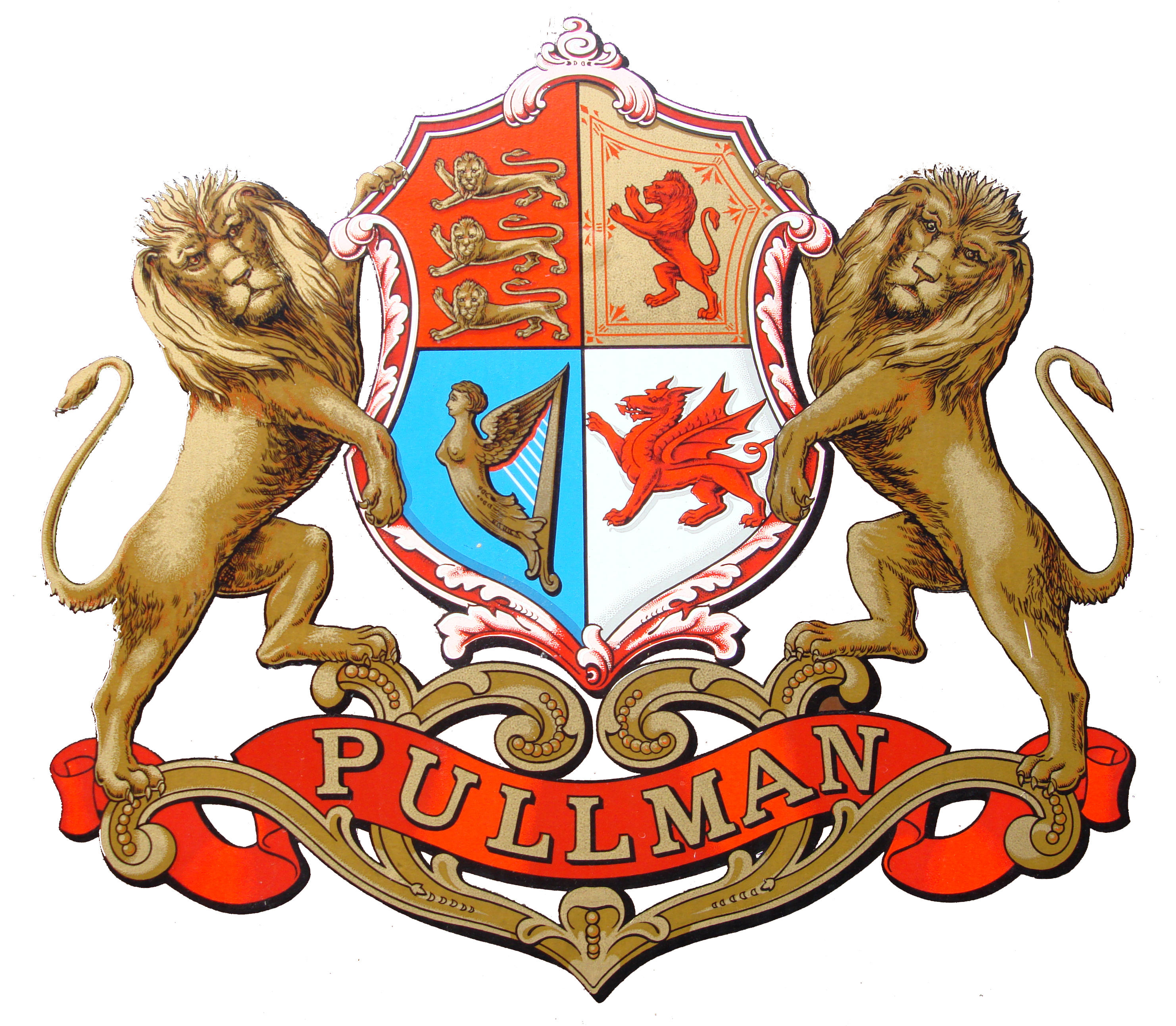
Pullman Shield seen on the sides of the company's coaches

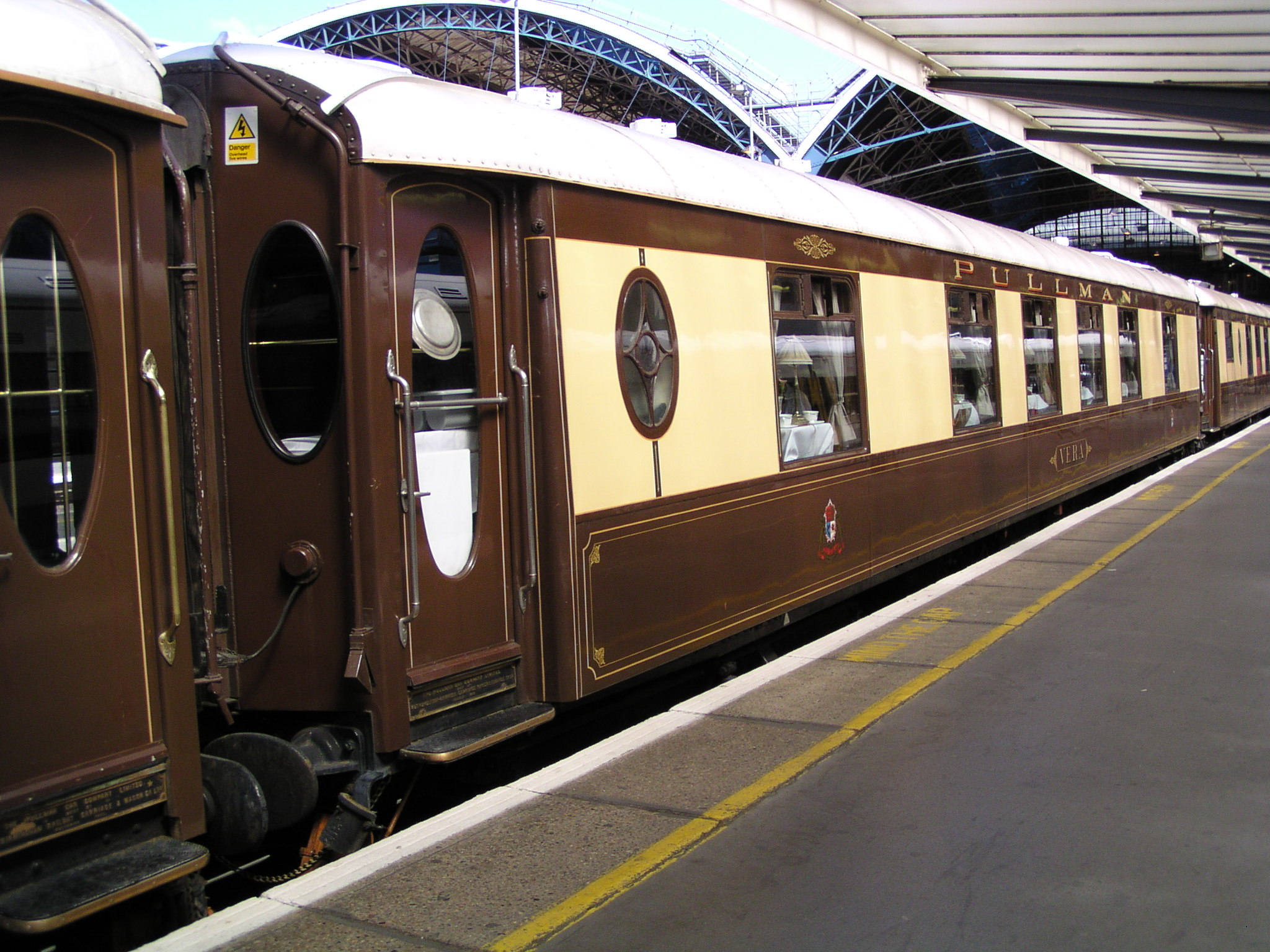
Former Brighton Belle Pullman carriage at London Victoria, now part of the Venice Simplon Orient Express fleet, note the oval lavatory window

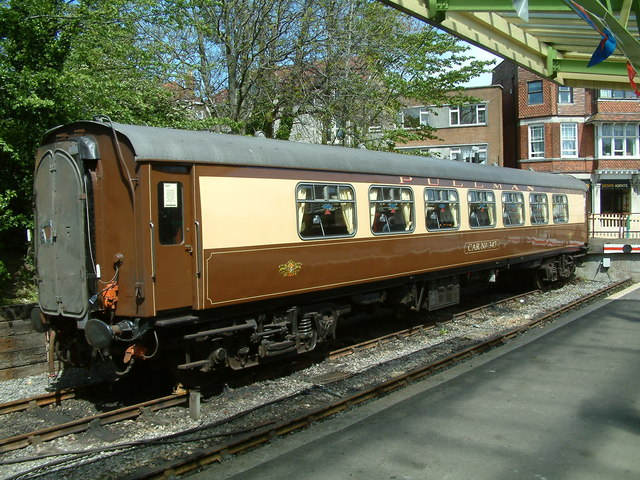
A former East Coast Main Line Pullman car built by Metro-Cammell in 1960 at Swanage station in 2005

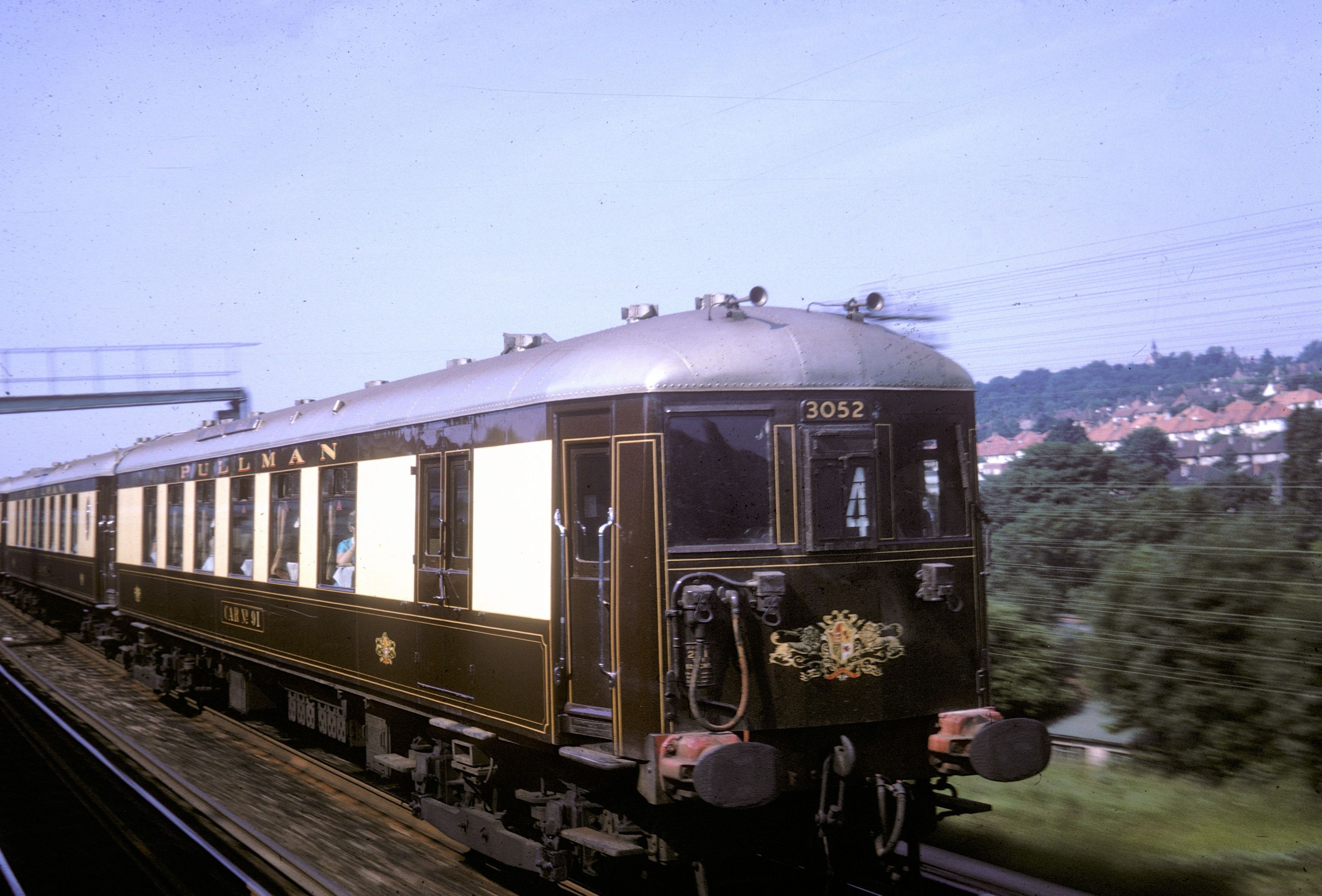
Class 403 on the Brighton Belle at Purley Oaks in June 1964

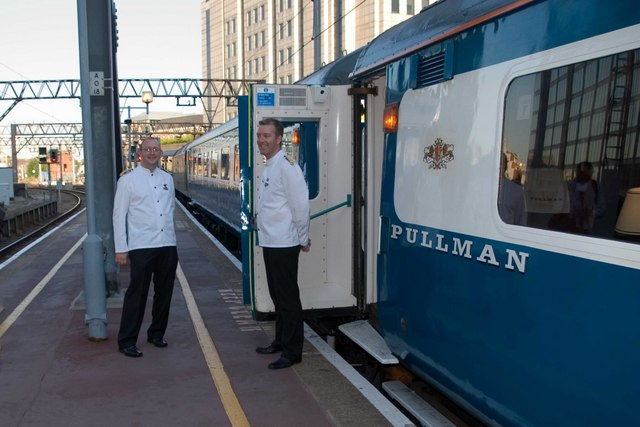
The Blue Pullman recreated by Hertfordshire Rail Tours at Fenchurch Street in June 2006

Pullman trains in Great Britain were mainline luxury railway services that operated with first-class coaches and a steward service, provided by the British Pullman Car Company (PCC) from 1874 until 1962, and then by British Railways from 1962 until 1972. Many named mainline service trains have subsequently used the word 'Pullman' in their titles, but most of these have been normal trains with increased first-class accommodation. Since 1982 however, some railtours have been operated by companies using Pullman coaches dating from the 1920s to 1950s to recreate the ambience of the heyday of Pullman travel.

== Origins ==
The first Pullman Railway Coach to enter service in the UK was in 1874 from Bradford Forster Square to London St Pancras after an assembly of imports from the United States, in an operation pioneered by the Midland Railway, working with the Pullman Company in Chicago. The coach "Midland" was of clerestory roofed design with balconies at both ends. The concept of luxury coaches spread to the other UK railway companies thereafter.

The PCC was formed in 1882 and named after the Pullman concept pioneered in the United States by the American railroader George Pullman. The company entered into contracts with the railway companies to operate Pullman services over their lines.

Pullman trains offered more luxurious accommodation than ordinary mainline trains. The PCC had its own workshops at Brighton. Pullman Car manufacture was also carried out by Birmingham Railway Carriage and Wagon Company and Metropolitan Cammell Carriage and Wagon Co. The London, Brighton and South Coast Railway was the first UK railway company to operate a complete Pullman train, the Pullman Limited, which started on the London Victoria to Brighton route on 5 December 1881.

As Mr Smail recounts:

"...In 1906 the LBSCR introduced three new thirty-five ton twelve-wheelers Princess Ena, Princess Patricia, and Duchess of Norfolk. These last three cars were the first Pullmans to be painted in the now familiar umber and cream livery. Hitherto the Brighton Pullmans had been painted dark mahogany brown with gold lining and scrollwork. Some of the older cars had the name in an oval panel on the side. In 1903 Mr. Billinton changed the colour of the ordinary L.B. & S.C.R. coaches to umber brown with white or cream upper panels, and in 1906 this colour scheme was also adopted by the Pullman Car Co., with the name of the car in large gilt letters..."

This was the beginning of the tradition of PCC services operating with a brown-and-cream livery and named carriages, which continues to the present day. Pullman trains were mostly locomotive-hauled, although from 1932 the electrified Southern Railway and its successors operated electric multiple units, the Class 403 as the Brighton Belle.

The Great Western Railway was reluctant to use Pullmans, considering its own carriages luxurious enough. However, in 1928 the company placed an order for seven Pullman cars – four Kitchen Cars and three Parlour Cars, No's 252-258 – with construction subcontracted to Metropolitan Cammell in Birmingham. Initially deployed from May 1929 on the London Paddington-Plymouth Millbay service, amongst standard GWR stock within the Ocean Liner Express boat train. From 8 July 1929, the vehicles were deployed to a new train, the Torquay Pullman Limited, an all-Pullman service which ran two days a week between London Paddington and Paignton, stopping at Newton Abbot and Torquay only. Not a commercial success, the train returned for the 1930 timetable as a three-car only service, but was withdrawn at the end of the summer timetable, with the carriages stored at Old Oak Common TMD. A proposal was made to return the full seven-car train in summer 1931, but the decision was taken not to operate the service. At the end of the year, the decision was made to terminate the experiment, and the carriages were sold to the Southern Railway, joining their Western Section carriage fleet pool at Clapham Junction. The GWR replaced them in 1932 with the more opulent Charles Collett designed GWR Super Saloons.

During World War II all Pullman services were suspended. They resumed operation shortly after the end of the war. The Pullman agreements were continued by British Railways upon nationalisation in 1948, while the Pullman company remained privately owned. The company acquired the lease on the former Taff Vale Railway carriage and wagon works in Cathays, Cardiff, which then maintained both Pullman stock as well as BR rolling stock, and residual private owner wagons. By the late 1950s the image of Pullman trains remained luxurious, but the rolling stock was increasingly outdated.

== Nationalisation ==
The PCC was bought by the British Transport Commission (BTC) in 1954. The BTC was the public body that controlled the nationalised transport in mainland Britain. At this point most of the Pullman fleet was somewhat elderly – apart from ten new cars which had entered service in 1951-52 (the building of seven of which had commenced in 1939, and another of which had a reconditioned chassis dating from 1927), the newest cars were 38 vehicles built for Southern Railway 5-BEL and 6-PUL electric multiple units in 1932. The BTC decided to modernise Pullman services as part of the British Railways 1955 Modernisation Plan, with new rolling stock and diesel or electric haulage. The most radical manifestation of this policy was the building of five new diesel multiple-unit Blue Pullman trains (36 cars) in 1960, in a special livery of Nanking blue and cream. Among the services which these initially operated were two new trains: the Midland Pullman (Manchester Central to London St Pancras), and the Birmingham Pullman (Wolverhampton Low Level to London Paddington), which offered business travellers alternatives to West Coast Main Line services at a time when that route was subject to frequent disruption due to electrification work. These were joined in 1960-61 by 44 new locomotive-hauled Pullman carriages based on the Mark I design, which were built by Metro-Cammell to modernise the East Coast Main Line Pullman services.

Despite new rolling stock, the Pullman company was experiencing difficulties. Although its equity was wholly owned by the BTC, its separate staffing and operations became an anomaly on the state-owned railway system, and staffing of the new Blue Pullmans had created some union disputes. The National Union of Railwaymen urged its integration into British Railways, which was completed in 1962, with it integrated with British Transport Hotels in January 1963. The Pullman company then ceased to exist as a separate legal entity, but Pullman trains continued to be operated. British Rail went on to build a final 29 cars in 1966, based on the Mark 2 design. These were used on new Manchester Pullman and Liverpool Pullman services over the newly electrified West Coast Main Line, replacing the Blue Pullman services to the Midlands. The Blue Pullman sets were then allocated solely to the Western Region and the traditional umber and cream Pullman livery was replaced by a new grey and blue livery, which the Blue Pullman units also received in 1969.

Despite this investment in new carriages, use of Pullman services declined. In part this was due to the development of the British motorway network and increasing competition from domestic air travel for the passengers who could afford the Pullman surcharge, but improvements to British Rail's normal first-class service also had an impact. For example, the Mark 1 Pullmans lacked air-conditioning, while later batches of ordinary Mark 2 stock had this feature as standard in both first and second class.

The Southern Region had not modernised its Pullman rolling stock, and was first to discontinue its Pullman trains. The Bournemouth Belle ceased in 1967, with the Brighton Belle and Golden Arrow following in 1972, by which time most of the coaches used on those trains were at least 40 years old. The Blue Pullman diesels used on the Western Region were a non-standard design which suffered from poor reliability, and were withdrawn when the Bristol Pullman and South Wales Pullman services ceased in 1973. The advent of much faster InterCity 125 trains with new Mark 3 coaches resulted in the demise of the Mark 1 Pullman services on the East Coast Main Line in 1978. By this time the Liverpool Pullman on the West Coast Main Line had also been discontinued, leaving just the Manchester Pullman. This was finally dropped in 1985, being replaced by increased first-class accommodation on ordinary West Coast Main Line services. A new batch of Mark 3b carriages built for this purpose initially carried Intercity Pullman branding and individual carriage names, but they were ordinary Open Firsts in otherwise standard InterCity livery. Subsequently, a number of named trains have used the word Pullman in their titles, but these have been normal trains with increased first-class accommodation.

== Continuation ==
The Venice Simplon Orient Express company has sought to recreate the ambience of the heyday of Pullman travel prior to World War II by purchasing much of the previous brown-and-cream Pullman stock from preservation trusts or general storage, and after restoration, began operations in April 1982.

In 2006 the Blue Pullman was recreated with locomotive-hauled Mark 2 rolling stock (since none of the original Blue Pullman DEMUs were preserved) by FM Rail's Hertfordshire Rail Tours subsidiary and then after its demise, by Cotswold Rail.

In February 2008, the Stobart Group launched a Pullman-style railtour company as the Stobart Pullman, operating for a period of just six months with Direct Rail Services Mark 3s.

In 2009, the 5BEL Trust commenced a project to return a five-car Class 403 Brighton Belle train to mainline operation. This represents the first time that a heritage electric traction unit will return to the mainline. The class 403 bodies are being fitted to class 421 frames. As at June 2019, testing is planned for spring 2020 so that charter and public runs might commence a few months after.

== Pullman train preservation ==
The Pullman cars have been popular on preserved railways and museums around Britain, with longer lines hosting regular dining services with the restored sets. The list below is of the railways that have or once had a Pullman coach.

- Bluebell Railway – Sheffield Park
- Colne Valley Railway – Castle Hedingham
- Churnet Valley Railway – Cheddleton
- Dartmouth Steam Railway – Paignton
- Ecclesbourne Valley Railway – Wirksworth
- East Somerset Railway – Cranmore
- Keighley and Worth Valley Railway – Haworth
- Kent and East Sussex Railway – Tenterden
- Lavender Line – Isfield
- National Railway Museum – York
- North Yorkshire Moors Railway – Pickering
- Shepperton railway station
- South Devon Railway – Buckfastleigh
- Swanage Railway – Swanage
- Swindon & Cricklade Railway – Blunsdon
- Watercress Line – Alresford
- West Somerset Railway – Minehead

== Notable Pullman trains ==
=== East Coast Main Line ===
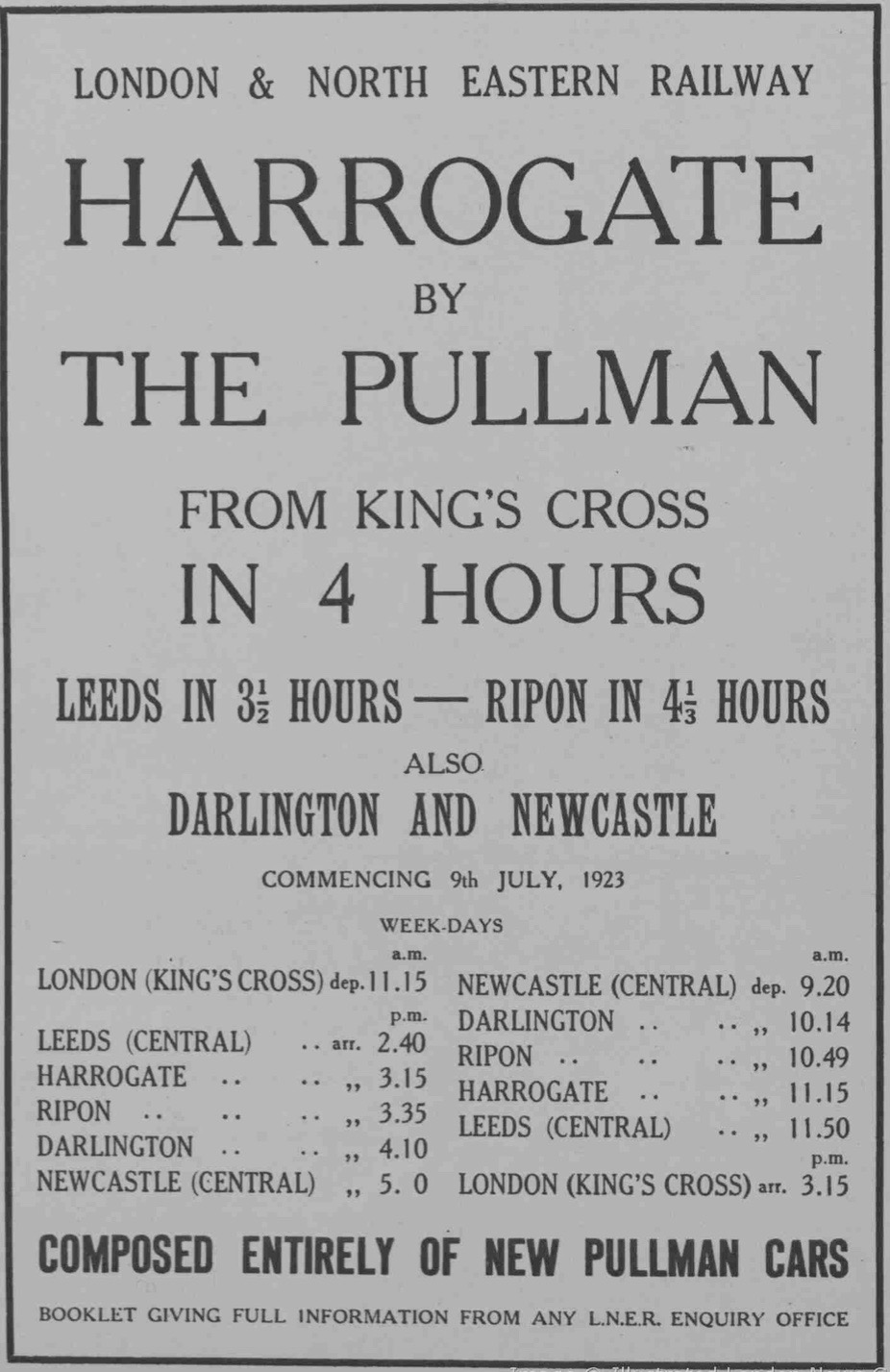
Advert for the Harrogate Pullman from the Illustrated London News 14 July 1923

- Harrogate Pullman (London Kings Cross - Harrogate, Newcastle, July 1923 – September 1925)
- Harrogate Sunday Pullman (London King's Cross - Harrogate, Sundays only, ceased 1967)
- Hull Pullman (London King's Cross - Hull Paragon, formerly Hull portion of Yorkshire Pullman, 1967–78)
- Queen of Scots (London King's Cross – Glasgow Queen Street, ceased 1964)
- Tees-Tyne Pullman (London King's Cross – Newcastle, ceased 1976)
- White Rose (London King's Cross – Harrogate, operated as a Pullman 1964–67 as replacement for Queen of Scots)
- Yorkshire Pullman (London King's Cross – Harrogate / Hull Paragon (to 1967), ceased 1978)
- Eastern Belle Pullman (London Liverpool Street to variously Felixstowe, Lowestoft, Cromer, Sheringham, Clacton, Hunstanton and Skegness, etc, as well as along the Aldeburgh branch line. Ran on one specific day of the week to each destination, e.g., in June 1929 the train ran to Felixstowe on Mondays, Clacton on Tuesdays, Frinton & Walton-on-the-Naze on Wednesdays, Dovercourt & Harwich on Thursdays and Thorpeness/Aldeburgh on Fridays, etc. Destinations and days visited varied in later years. Ran only from 1929 to 1939 and did not resume post-war.

=== Midland Main Line ===
- Midland Pullman (Blue Pullman service, London St Pancras - Manchester Central, also short workings from London to Leicester or Nottingham, 1960–66 only, replaced by Manchester Pullman)

=== West Coast Main Line ===
- Liverpool Pullman (London Euston – Liverpool Lime Street, 1966–75)
- Manchester Pullman (London Euston – Manchester Piccadilly, 1966–85)

=== Great Western Main Line ===
- Birmingham Pullman (Blue Pullman service, London Paddington - Wolverhampton Low Level, 1960–67)
- Bristol Pullman (Blue Pullman service, London Paddington - Bristol Temple Meads, 1960–73)
- Oxford Pullman (Blue Pullman service, London Paddington - Oxford, 1967–69)
- South Wales Pullman (Blue Pullman service after 1961, London Paddington - Swansea High Street, 1955–73)
- Torquay Pullman Limited (London Paddington - Paignton), Ran 08/07/29- summer 1930, Mondays & Fridays

=== Southern Lines ===
- Bournemouth Belle (London Waterloo – Bournemouth West (to 1965) or Bournemouth Central, ceased 1967)
- Brighton Belle (Pullman EMU service, London Victoria – Brighton, ceased 1972)
- Devon Belle (London Waterloo – Ilfracombe, ceased 1954, also a portion to Plymouth Friary until 1949)
- Eastbourne Pullman (Pullman EMU service, London Victoria – Eastbourne, summer Sundays only, 1950–57)
- Golden Arrow (London Victoria – Dover Marine or Folkestone Harbour, ceased 1972)
- Kentish Belle (London Victoria – Ramsgate / Canterbury East, 1951–58, replacement for Thanet Belle)
- Thanet Belle (London Victoria – Ramsgate, ceased 1950)

== Pullman rolling stock ==
- Southern Railway 6-PUL EMU
- Southern Railway 5-BEL EMU (Brighton Belle)
- British Railways Blue Pullman DMU
- British Railways Mark 1
- British Railways Mark 2
- Preserved British Pullman carriages

== See also ==
- George Pullman
- Pullman Company (USA)
- GWR Super Saloons
- Clerestory, railway coach roof design following the Pullman American influence
