= Tees-Tyne Pullman =

The Tees-Tyne Pullman was a British Pullman train which formerly operated on the East Coast Main Line between London King's Cross and Newcastle, England. It first operated in 1948. Other than the Golden Arrow, it was the first British Pullman train to operate with a bar carriage - known as "The Hadrian Bar."

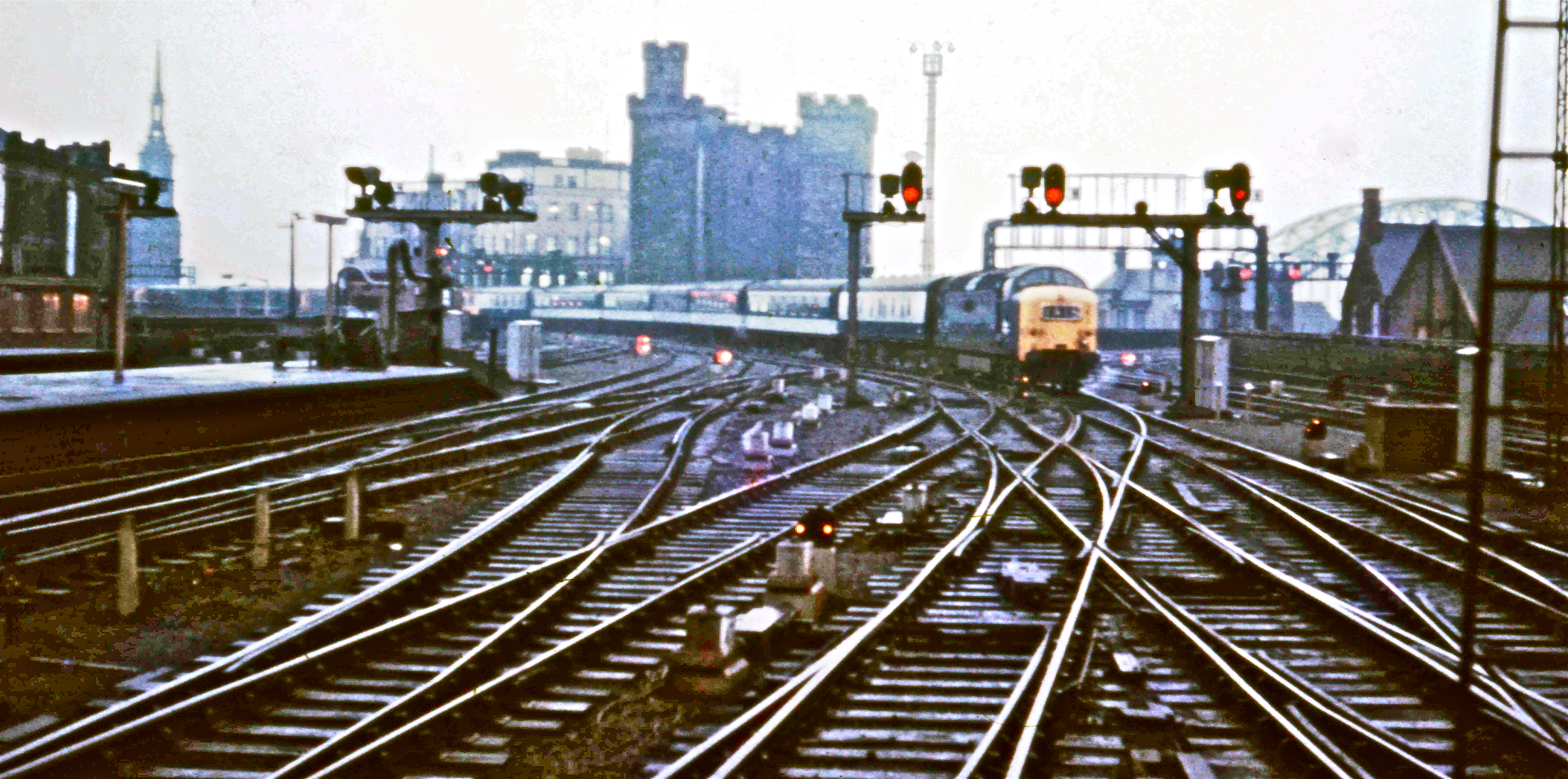
Deltic and empty Tees-Tyne stock entering Newcastle in 1972

The train was initially operated with Pullman carriages built in 1928. These were replaced in late 1960 and early 1961 by new carriages built by Metro-Cammell based on the British Rail Mark 1 design. In 1969 the second class accommodation was replaced with ordinary carriages and the popular Hadrian Bar carriage was withdrawn. The remaining first class carriages were repainted into grey livery with blue window surrounds.

By the 1970s the non-air conditioned Pullman carriages were becoming dated, especially in comparison to the newer British Rail Mark 2 carriages then being introduced. With the imminent introduction of InterCity 125 trains, the Tees-Tyne Pullman was finally withdrawn in 1976.
