= Blue Pullman (film) =

1960 British documentary film by James Ritchie

- Blue Pullman at Cheadle Heath railway station
- Directed by: James Ritchie
- Written by: James Ritchie
- Produced by: Edgar Anstey
- Cinematography: David Watkin; Jack West
- Edited by: Hugh Raggett
- Release date: 1960
- Running time: 23 minutes
- Country: United Kingdom

Blue Pullman is a 1960 British short documentary film directed an written by James Ritchie. It was produced by British Transport Films and follows the development and preparation of a train journey from Manchester to London on new British Railways Blue Pullman diesel multiple units.

== Premise ==
The film includes coverage of engineers conducting the train's technical trials, and the Manchester Piccadilly to London St Pancras journey filmed from the driver's cab and from the air.

== Reception ==
The Monthly Film Bulletin wrote: "It is a pity that the producers, for some inexplicable reason, appear reluctant to show the train starting and stopping properly: the arrival at St. Pancras in particular is sadly botched and comes as a let down after the vivid presentation of the Blue Pullman in motion. A very nicely made informational film which has the distinct virtues too of an effective score by Clifton Parker, stylish editing and a commendable inclination to let the visuals speak for themselves: how pleasant indeed not to have an incessantly chattering commentator and, instead, to have descriptive comments kept to a minimum."

== Accolades ==
The won several awards, including the Technical & Industrial Information section of the Festival for Films for Television in 1961.
