= Knowle and Dorridge rail crash =

1963 railway accident in England

Coordinates: 52.3707°N 1.7511°W

Details
- Date: 15 August 1963; 13:50
- Location: Knowle and Dorridge station, West Midlands
- Country: England
- Line: Birmingham to Oxford
- Cause: Signaller's error

Statistics
- Trains: 2
- Deaths: 3

The Knowle and Dorridge rail crash was a fatal rail crash that occurred at Dorridge railway station in Warwickshire, England, on 15 August 1963. Three people died in the crash after a signalman's error routed a small freight train into the path of an express passenger train which slowed but could not stop before colliding with it.

== The incident ==
Leading end of diesel locomotive after withdrawal of carflat

Loaded carflat, the Rear vehicle of the shunting movement

The express was a Birmingham Pullman service travelling from Birmingham Snow Hill to London Paddington, having departed at 1pm. The freight train movement in Dorridge station (called Knowle and Dorridge at the time, and until 1974) was a routine shunting manoeuvre, one that often occurred both before or after the express train had passed through the station. The express train was normally formed by a Blue Pullman multiple unit, an experimental type of new luxury train built for Pullman services, but this regular train had had to be taken out of service and replaced by the stand-by set of coaches and diesel hydraulic locomotive.

The Pullman was 9 coaches long, and was hauled by an 11-month-old diesel hydraulic Class 52 "Western" locomotive, D1040 Western Queen. The freight train was formed (from the London end) of a 20-long-ton (22-short-ton; 20 t) hopper wagon, a Class 5101 no. 4111, a 20-long-ton (22-short-ton; 20 t) brake van, an empty bogie flatcar, and a bogie flatcar loaded with Land Rover vehicles.

The crash occurred in fine dry weather, at around 1.10 pm. The express was travelling at its usual speed of around 80 mph (130 km/h) approaching the station when the driver noticed the Knowle and Dorridge distant signal at caution. He applied the brakes but was only able to reduce speed to 20 mph (32 km/h), before colliding with the freight train which was stationary on the same line, having stopped when the signalman showed the driver a red flag. The distant signal was only 902 yards (825 m) from Knowle's up main home signal, insufficient distance for the express to stop from 80 mph (130 km/h). The locomotive struck the loaded flat car crushing the cab, but without derailing. Two freight cars were derailed, with the rest pushed 64 yards (59 m) down the track.

All four men on the freight train, the driver, fireman, shunter and guard, managed to jump clear before the collision. The driver, co-driver and second man on the express locomotive all died. One of the drivers killed in the accident was Ernie Morris, one of the first drivers to be certified on the Blue Pullman sets, and who had featured in the 1962 British Transport Film "Lets Go To Birmingham", a driver's eye view of the Blue Pullman sets on a run from London Paddington to Birmingham Snow Hill. Two drivers were required on this working and the other driver killed was Sid Bench. The second man, also killed, was David Corkery who was only on the train to cover for the rostered man who had gone sick.

== Causes ==
It was found that the signalman at Knowle and Dorridge signal box had forgotten he had signalled that the up main line was clear for the express train and allowed the freight train onto the same line, in its path. On receiving a "train approaching" signal for the express, he realised his mistake, but was only able to alert the freight train by red flag. Although it braked to a halt, it could not be cleared from the main line in time to avoid the collision.

As a contributory factor to the crash, it was found that the signalman, in clearing the express, had disregarded a standing order known as Regulation 4A, governing the safe operation of signals in sections of track where the minimum stopping distance for trains was greater than the distance between signals. He had given "line clear" for the express train to the preceding signal box before receiving the required clearance from the following signal box. Instead, he should have sent a "blocking back inside home signal" message to Bentley Heath, the preceding signal box, so that the express train could have been slowed in plenty of time by the Bentley Heath distant signal at caution. However, it was not determined at the enquiry whether the signalman had cleared the express before or after allowing the conflicting freight movement. This may have been academic if the express had been cleared before the freight train was permitted to foul the up main line, even if Regulation 4A had been obeyed.

The Inspecting Officer had the train register studied and compared with those of neighbouring signalboxes. This showed that the signalman had got into the habit of ignoring Regulation 4A and had also made numerous errors and omissions in recording the passage of trains in the train register. These unsafe working practices led directly to the accident. After the crash, the distant signal for the preceding signalbox (Bentley Heath) was interlocked with the Knowle distant signal so that the former could not be cleared if the latter was at caution, giving automatic rather than manual protection. He also discussed with British Railway engineers whether the crash protection of the lightweight cab could be improved.

== See also ==
- List of rail accidents in the United Kingdom
