= Midland Pullman =

Passenger train service

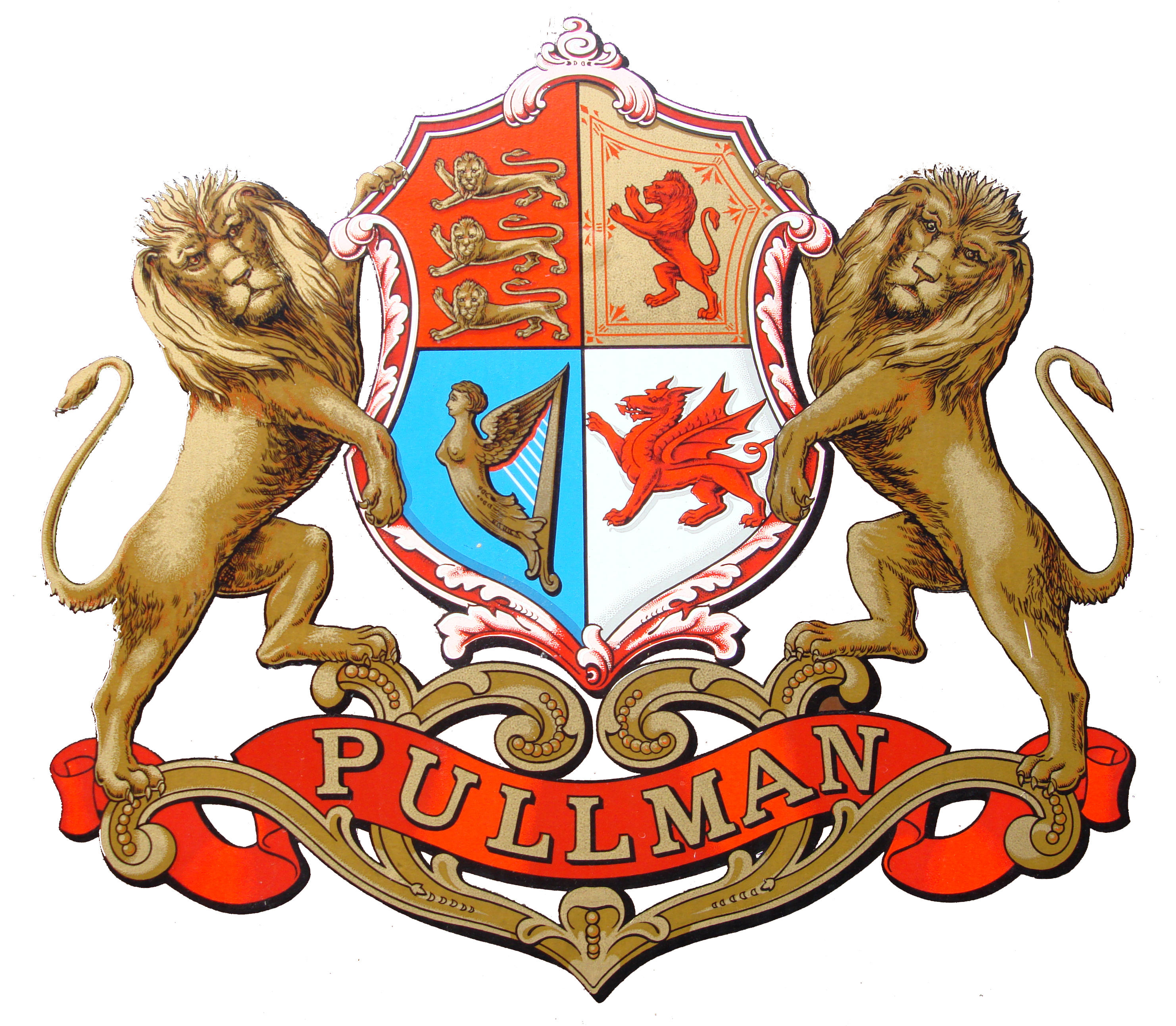

Overview
- Service type: Passenger train
- First service: 12 September 1960
- Last service: 1966
- Successor: Manchester Pullman
- Former operator: British Rail

Route
- Termini: London St Pancras; Manchester Central
- Average journey time: 3 hours 15 minutes
- Service frequency: Every weekday
- Line used: Midland Main Line

Technical
- Rolling stock: Blue Pullman
- Track gauge: 4 ft 8 1/2 in (1,435 mm)
- Operating speed: 90 miles per hour (140 km/h)

The Midland Pullman was the name given to a former express passenger train service operating on British Railways' old Midland Main Line between London St Pancras and Manchester Central via Leicester and Millers Dale. The train completed the journey in 3 hours 15 minutes.

This service is not to be confused with the first Midland Railway Pullman coach introduced in 1874, named "Midland" which was of clerestory roofed design, imported from the Pullman Company in the US and assembled in Derby.

== Blue Pullman ==
On 4 July 1960 the Midland Pullman was relaunched as a luxury all-first-class service using two new Blue Pullman six-car diesel-electric units, aimed at covering the high end of the Manchester-London business market while services on the West Coast Main Line were disrupted during electrification. It called only at Cheadle Heath (now closed), and made the journey from London to Manchester in a record 3 hours 15 minutes. The best time between the two cities immediately previously had been 3 hours 50 minutes.

The Midland Pullman ran every weekday, up to London in the morning and down to Manchester in the evening. To fill in between these turns, there was an afternoon return trip from St Pancras to Nottingham described by railway staff as "The most luxurious ECS (Note: Empty coaching stock) in the world." The train had two kitchens, and a full meal service was provided at every seat.

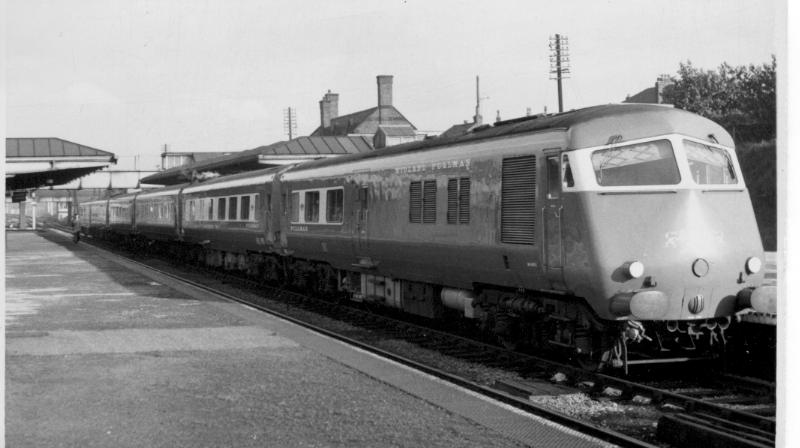
Six-car Midland Pullman train at Cheadle Heath railway station in 1960

The operation attracted criticism because being a fixed-formation train it required a full spare set, making poor use of expensive assets. Critics also noted that the new service was not best timed for priority business use: initially the up Midland Pullman did not leave Manchester until 09:00.

Other commentators, however, praised the speed and smoothness of the journey and the luxury of the trains. Trains were later re-timed to suit business travellers better.

The service was withdrawn in 1966 and replaced by the electric-locomotive-hauled Manchester Pullman running from Manchester Piccadilly to London Euston via the newly electrified West Coast Main Line, with a much-reduced journey time of 2 hours 30 minutes, marking the end of the Midland line as a significant route for Manchester-London traffic.

An attempt was made to find work for the train units on the East Coast Main Line but, plagued as they were by rough-riding bogies, they were never run in revenue-earning service. The two units were eventually transferred to the Western Region to work alongside the Western Pullman units, which were eight-car units and included second class coaches.

== See also ==
- British Rail Classes 251 and 261
- Pullman train (UK)
