= Liverpool Pullman =

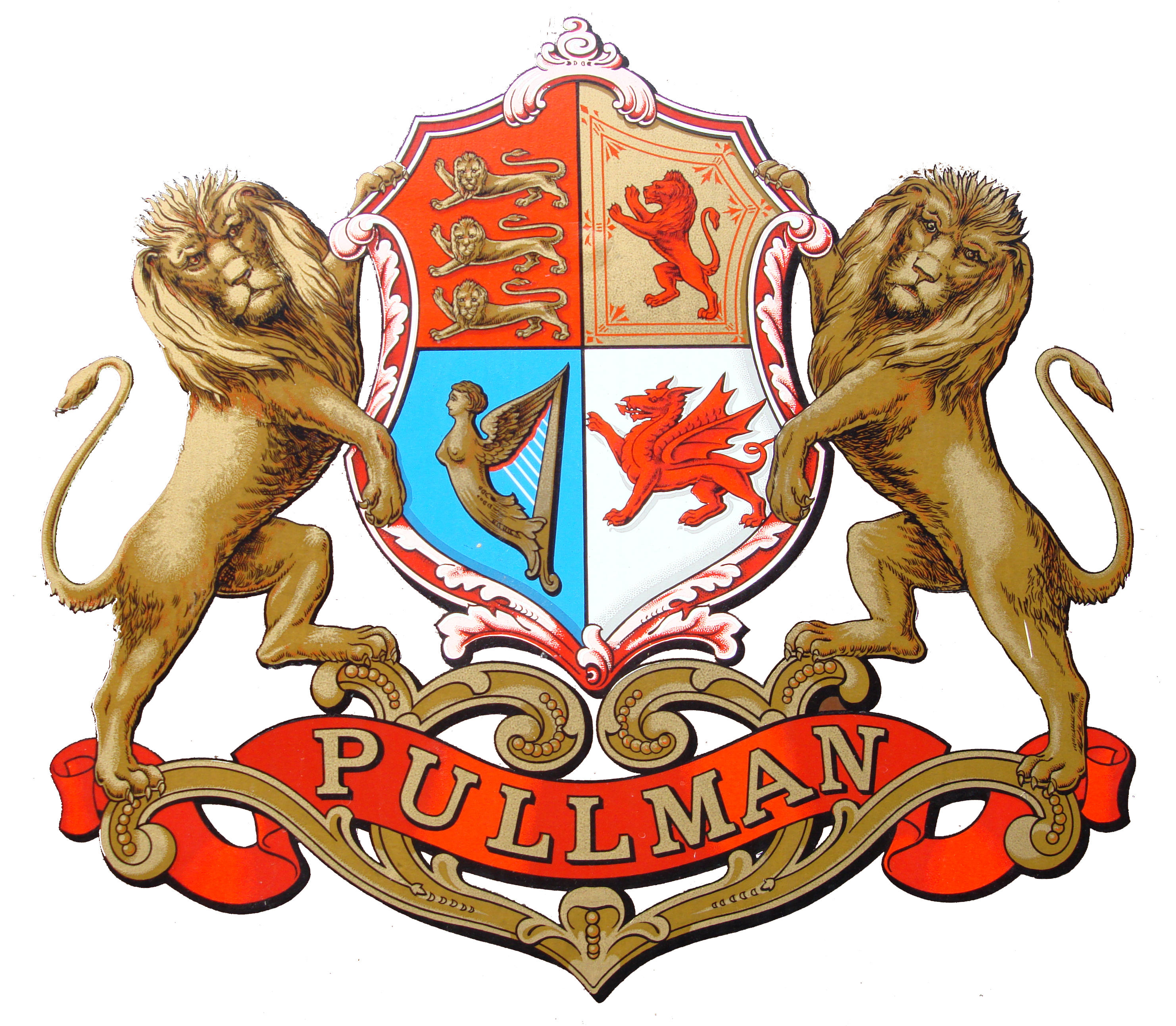

Overview
- Service type: Passenger train
- First service: 18 April 1966
- Current operator(s): British Railways
- Former operator(s): Pullman Car Company

Route
- Termini: London Euston; Liverpool
- Service frequency: Twice daily
- Line(s) used: West Coast Main Line

On-board services
- Class(es): Class 86

Technical
- Rolling stock: Pullman
- Track gauge: 4 ft 8 1/2 in (1,435 mm)
- Operating speed: 100 miles per hour (160 km/h)

The Liverpool Pullman was a British Pullman train operated by the London Midland Region of British Railways. It ran twice daily from Liverpool Lime Street to London Euston and return, calling only at Runcorn and Watford Junction. It was introduced in 1966 upon the electrification of the West Coast Main Line.

The Liverpool Pullman made the end-to-end London-Liverpool journey in a record 2 hours 35 minutes. This was achieved partly by not calling at Crewe, contrary to standard practice at the time, and partly by being of relatively low weight, having only eight coaches in total. Unlike many British Pullman services (including its sister train of the same era, the Manchester Pullman), it was not all-Pullman but also conveyed second-class coaches. Its typical formation was four 2nd-class coaches and four first-class Pullman cars (two 36-seat parlour cars, one 18-seat kitchen car and one 30-seat parlour brake), hauled by a Class 86 electric locomotive.

Upon introduction on 18 April 1966 the timetable was:

Down trains: London Euston dep. / 07:45 / 18:10; Liverpool Lime Street arr. / 10:24 / 20:46	Up trains: Liverpool Lime Street dep. / 07:55 / 18:00; London Euston arr. / 10:30 / 20:46

In 1968 the down (northbound) Liverpool Pullman was scheduled to cover the 163 miles from Watford Junction to Runcorn in 119 minutes, for an average speed of 82.3 mph, then the fastest-ever start-to-stop regular timing in Britain.

The Liverpool Pullman was not as successful as its Manchester counterpart, and in the 1970s it was downgraded to an ordinary unnamed train at a time when the Pullman concept had gone out of fashion.

== See also ==
- List of named passenger trains of the United Kingdom
