= British Rail Class 403 =

Type of Pullman EMU used in Great Britain

Southern Railway 5-BEL; British Rail Class 403
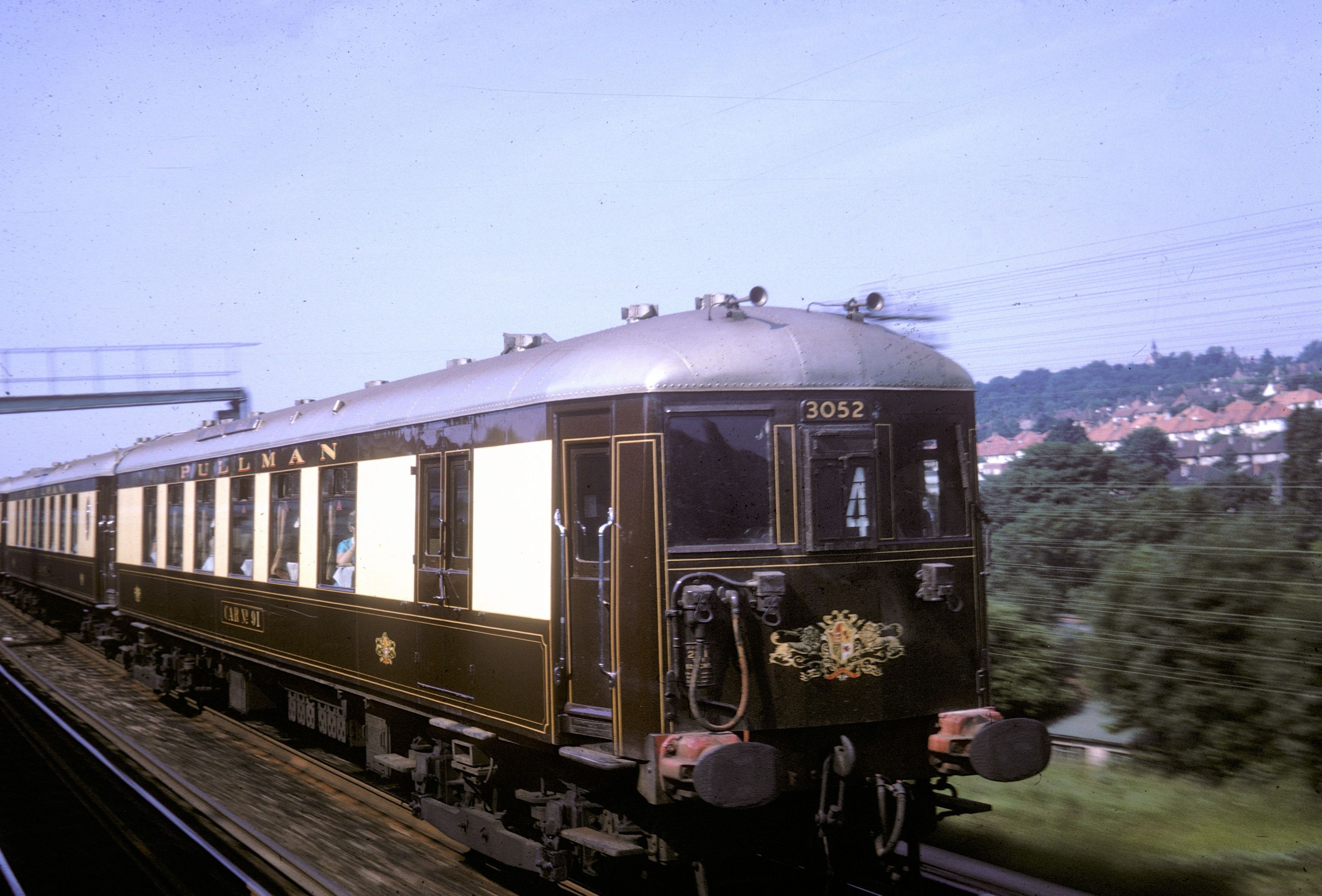
- 3052 passing through Purley Oaks in 1964
- In service: 1932–1972
- Manufacturer: Metropolitan Cammell Carriage, Wagon and Finance Company
- Constructed: 1932
- Number built: Three sets (15 cars)
- Number preserved: 14 cars
- Number scrapped: 1 car
- Formation: 5-car set: DMBPT-TPFK-TPFK-TPT-DMBPT
- Fleet numbers: Sets: 2051–2053 (later 3051–3053); Cars: 279–293
- Capacity: 40 First, 132 Third (DMBPT: 48, TPT: 56, TPFK: 20)
- Operators: Southern Railway (1933–1941, 1946–1947); British Railways (1948–1972)
- Line served: Brighton Main Line

Specifications
- Car body construction: All steel
- Maximum speed: 75 mph (121 km/h)
- Weight: Set: 249 long tons (253 t; 279 short tons)
- Traction motors: Eight EE163 traction motors
- Power output: 8 x 225 hp (168 kW); 1,800 hp (1,342 kW) (total)
- Electric system: 660–750 V DC third rail
- Current collection: contact shoe
- Braking system: Automatic Air
- Coupling system: Screw-link
- Track gauge: 4 ft 8 1/2 in (1,435 mm) standard gauge

The Southern Railway (SR) gave the designation 5-BEL to the five-car all-Pullman electric multiple units which worked the prestigious Brighton Belle trains between London Victoria and Brighton. These units survived long enough in British Rail ownership to be allocated TOPS Class 403. Between 1933 and 1935 the units were designated 5-PUL (the 'PUL' code was then used for the 6-PUL units).

== Construction ==
The SR electrified the London Victoria to Brighton line in the early 1930s, and full electric services commenced over the route from 1 January 1933. For the high-profile Southern Belle Pullman train three five-car units, consisting entirely of Pullman cars, were built. All 15 cars were built by Metropolitan Cammell. In June 1934 the Southern Railway renamed the Southern Belle as the Brighton Belle.

As they were Pullman cars, owned by the independent Pullman Car Company (UK), the individual carriages were numbered in its series, taking numbers 279 to 293, and the first class cars were given women's names while the third (from June 1956, second) class cars carried less-inspiring Car No xx designations, derived from the second and third digits of the Pullman Car Company's number. However, the units together were allocated numbers in the SR series, originally taking 2051-2053, which was revised in January 1937 to 3051-3053.

== Formations ==
Three different car types were built - Driving Motor Brake Parlour Third (DMBPT), Trailer Parlour First with Kitchen (TPFK), and Trailer Parlour Third (TPT). Initial formations of these units were as follows:

Unit Numbers	DMBPT	TPFK	TPFK	TPT	DMBPT
2051 / 3051	288 Car No 88	279 Hazel	282 Doris	286 Car No 86	289 Car No 89
2052 / 3052	290 Car No 90	280 Audrey	284 Vera	287 Car No 87	291 Car No 91
2053 / 3053	292 Car No 92	281 Gwen	283 Mona	285 Car No 85	293 Car No 93

== Withdrawal and preservation ==
The last Brighton Belle train ran on 30 April 1972, and the three 5BEL units were withdrawn. However all 15 cars were sold into private ownership, though no unit was kept together as a single entity. Instead they were split up and each vehicle was initially used as an individual Pullman car, the majority not in railway use. A number have been returned to service on the main line with the Belmond British Pullman (previously the Venice Simplon Orient Express or VSOE), as hauled cars forming part of the British Pullman charter train. A campaign to return the Brighton Belle to mainline service was launched by the 5BEL Trust Bringing back THE BRIGHTON BELLE | THE BRIGHTON BELLE in 2008. By 2009, the trust had assembled a four-car set, having acquired cars from the North Norfolk Railway and VSOE. A fifth car, No.282 'Doris', was acquired from the Bluebell Railway in 2011 and a sixth, No.279 'Hazel' in 2012. After restoration, the Brighton Belle started testing in January 2025 from its base at Crewe.

The table below sets out the current position:

Key:	Stored	In service	Scrapped/Destroyed	Preserved

Number	Name	Location	Note	Image
279	Hazel	Ramparts, Barrow Hill	5-BEL Trust, under restoration	
280	Audrey		VSOE, in service	
281	Gwen		VSOE, in service	
282	Doris	Ramparts, Barrow Hill	5-BEL Trust, to be restored	
283	Mona		VSOE, stored	
284	Vera		VSOE, in service	
285	Car No 85		5BEL Trust, under restoration	
286	Car No 86		VSOE, stored	
287	Car No 87	Ramparts, Barrow Hill	5-BEL Trust, under restoration	
288	Car No 88	Ramparts, Barrow Hill	5-BEL Trust, under restoration	
289	Car No 89	Carriages of Cambridge	Privately owned,	
290	Car No 90		Destroyed by fire in 1991	
291	Car No 91	Ramparts, Barrow Hill	5-BEL Trust, under restoration	
292	Car No 92		VSOE, stored	
293	Car No 93	Ramparts, Barrow Hill	VSOE, stored	

== Model railways ==
Hornby Railways produced OO gauge models of the 5-BEL from 2012, in both BR blue and grey and Pullman umber and cream liveries. N gauge models were introduced in 2013 at 1:143 scale, under Hornby's Arnold brand, in both umber and cream livery and BR blue and grey livery.
