= Blue Pullman =

Series of luxury train used by British Rail

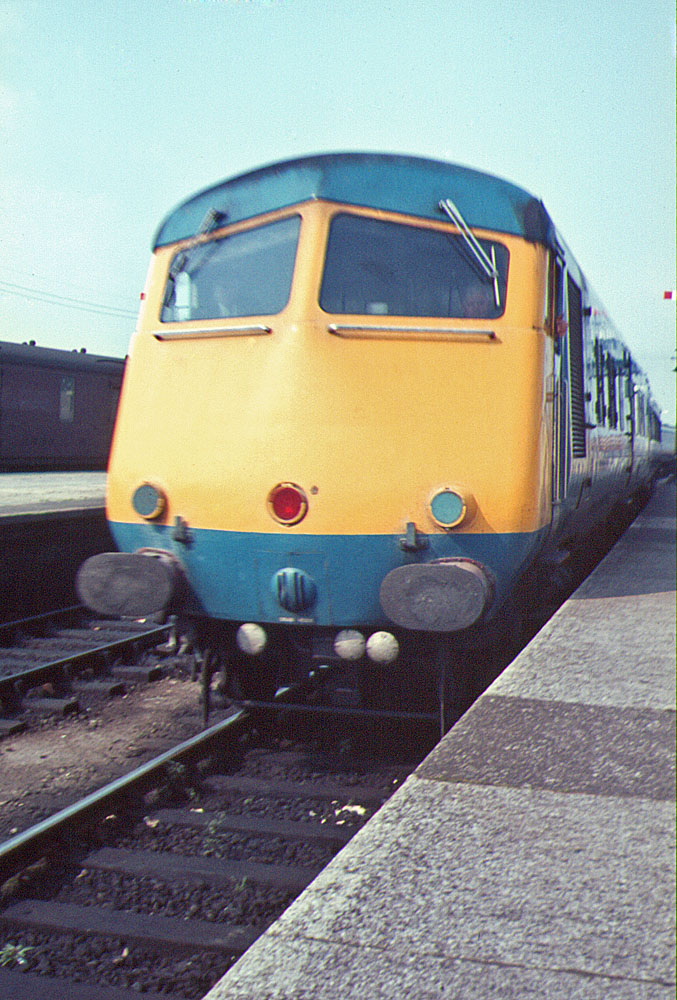
- Blue Pullman at Swansea station in 1967

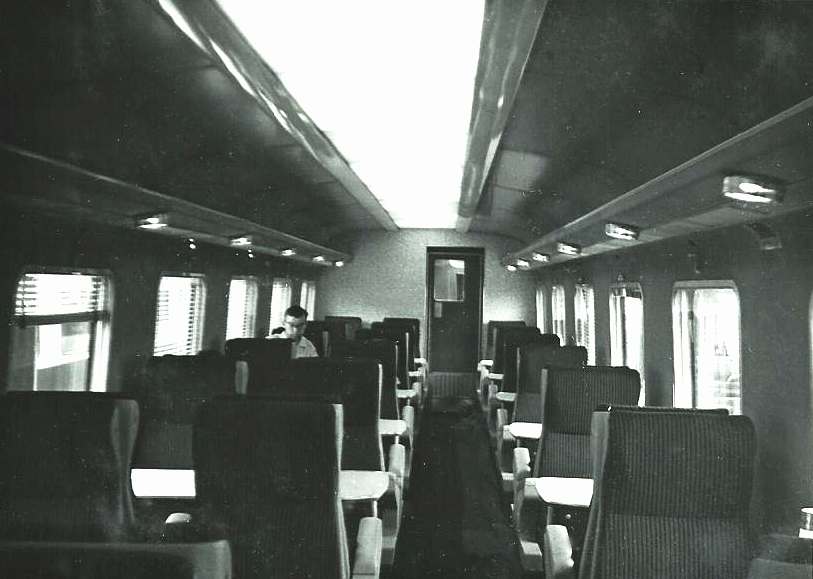
- Interior of Blue Pullman
- In service: 1960–1973
- Manufacturer: Metropolitan-Cammell
- Family name: Blue Pullman
- Replaced: Steam locomotives and carriages
- Constructed: 1959–1960
- Entered service: 12 September 1960
- Refurbished: 1969
- Scrapped: 1974–1975
- Number built: 5 sets (2 × 6-car; 3 × 8-car)
- Number scrapped: All
- Successor: Separate locomotives and Mark 2 coaches
- Formation: 6 or 8 cars per set
- Fleet numbers: DMBFL: M60090–3; DMBS: W60094–9; MSL: W60644–9; MFLRK: M60730–3; TFLRK: W60734–9; TFL: 60740–9
- Capacity: 6-car sets: 132; 8-car sets: 218
- Operator: British Rail
- Depots: Old Oak Common; Reading; Tyseley
- Lines served: 6-car sets: London Midland Region (1960-1967) and Western Region (1967-1973); 8-car sets: Western Region

Specifications
- Car body construction: Steel; Semi-integral
- Train length: 395 ft (120.40 m) (MR); 545 ft 1 in (166.14 m) (WR)
- Car length: 66 ft 5.5 in (20.26 m) (power cars); 65 ft 6 in (19.96 m) (intermediate vehicles)
- Width: 9 ft 6 in (2.90 m)
- Height: 12 ft 4.5 in (3.77 m)
- Doors: Hinged slam, centrally locked
- Maximum speed: 90 mph (145 km/h)
- Weight: 6-car sets: 299 long tons (335 short tons; 304 t); 8-car sets: 364 long tons (408 short tons; 370 t)
- Prime mover: NBL/MAN V12 Supercharged 64L(×2)
- Power output: 1,000 hp (750 kW) (×2)
- Transmission: traction motors: 199 hp (148 kW) (×8)
- Auxiliaries: 2× Rolls-Royce C8NFLH @ 190 bhp, under floor for air conditioning
- UIC classification: 6-car sets: 2′Bo′+Bo′2′+2′2′+2′2′+2′Bo′+Bo′2′ 8-car sets: 2′Bo′+Bo′2′+2′2′+2′2′+2′2′+2′2′+2′Bo′+Bo′2′
- Bogies: Metro-Schlieran frictionless
- Braking system: Westinghouse Electro-pneumatic brake featuring a high speed control
- Multiple working: 2 sets (6-car units (1967-1973)
- Track gauge: 4 ft 8 1/2 in (1,435 mm)

The Blue Pullmans were luxury trains used from 1960 to 1973 by British Rail. They were the first Pullman diesel multiple units, incorporating several novel features.

Named after their original Nanking blue livery, the trains were conceived under the 1955 Modernisation Plan to create luxury diesel express trains aimed at competing with the motor car and the emerging domestic air travel market. Although not entirely successful – they were seen as underpowered and ultimately not economically viable – they demonstrated the possibility of fixed-formation multiple-unit inter-city train services. A decade later, the concept was developed as the InterCity 125, which resembled the Blue Pullmans in having an integral power car at each end of the train.

There were two versions, built by Metro-Cammell in Birmingham: two first-class six-car sets for the London Midland Region (LMR), and three two-class eight-car sets for the Western Region (WR). They were initially operated by the luxury train operator the Pullman Car Company, which the British Transport Commission (BTC) had acquired in 1954. Shortly after their introduction, in 1962, the Pullman Car Company was incorporated into the British Railways network. Originally given the last Pullman vehicle numbers, towards the end of their operational life the trains gained the British Rail TOPS classification of Class 251 (motor cars) and Class 261 (kitchen and parlour cars), although they never carried these numbers.

The WR sets operated from London Paddington to Birmingham and Wolverhampton, and to Bristol, Cardiff and Swansea. The LMR sets operated the Midland Pullman between London St Pancras and Manchester Central via the Midland Main Line, a journey it accomplished in a record 3 hours 15 minutes with a maximum speed of 90 miles per hour (140 km/h). The Midland Pullman was withdrawn in 1966 following electrification of the London Euston to Manchester Piccadilly line, which brought greatly reduced journey times with which the Midland route could not compete. The LMR sets were then transferred to the WR, where some of the first-class seating was downgraded to form two-class sets.

The sets were an advanced and luxurious design, befitting a Pullman train, although they did suffer some criticism particularly over a persistent ride quality problem. Over time, it became costly to maintain such a small fleet of trains. By 1972, with the development of first-class accommodation in Mark 2 coaching stock, the surcharge for Blue Pullmans seemed uneconomical and unreliable to passengers and BR managers. In 1973, the trains were withdrawn and none were preserved.

The sets featured in three films, one of the same name as a documentary of the design and development, and an observation of the first service. From 2006, the Blue Pullman name was revived as a charter railtour, operated by various companies.

== History ==
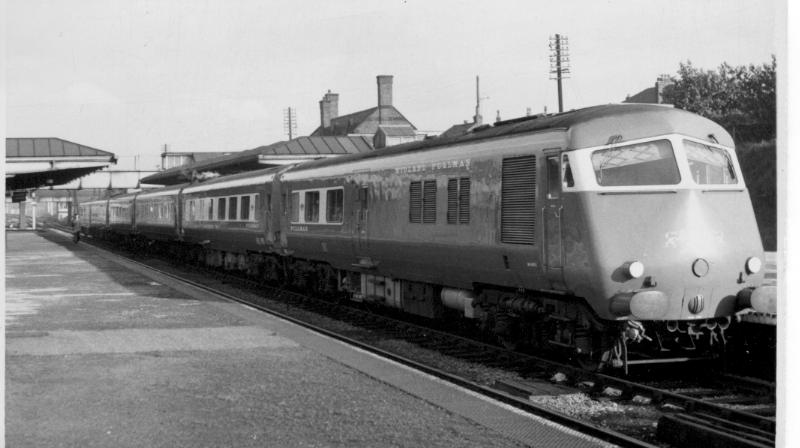
The Midland Pullman at Cheadle Heath before its regular non-stop morning run to London St Pancras in 1960

=== Inception ===
In June 1954, the BTC, which operated the railways through its British Railways subsidiary, purchased the full equity of the Pullman Car Company, a private operator of luxury carriages on the otherwise nationalised passenger network.

Under the 1955 Modernisation Plan, there was a push toward diesel power to replace steam locomotives and Pullman coaching stock was ageing. The BTC and PCC formed a committee to examine the possibility of running diesel express passenger trains using new trains. Initially proposed as the Midland Pullman, it was timed to compete on the London to Manchester route against car and air travel. After being initially rejected for operational reasons, the BTC decided to make use of the reputation of the recently acquired Pullman company to operate the new service. Two six-car units, all first class, were ordered for the LMR and three eight-car units for the WR in 1957.

=== Services ===
The selection of Pullman caused some initial delays due to trade union staffing problems, variances in pay and conditions of the Pullman staff compared to BR train staff. After some production delays, the first set appeared for trials in October 1959. These trials revealed that rough ride quality was a problem, and modifications were made. These mitigated the problem, but it was never entirely removed.

After a demonstration run on 24 June 1960, Midland Pullman commenced on 4 July 1960, and the WR trains on 12 September. They operated Monday to Friday only. Weekends were reserved for maintenance, and allowed their occasional use on special or charter services to events such as the Grand National.

The Midland Pullman ran from 1960 to 1966 in the morning from Manchester Central to London St Pancras, calling at Cheadle Heath; a fill-in journey from St Pancras to Leicester, Loughborough, Nottingham and return; and an evening return to Manchester.

With completion of the electrification of the West Coast Main Line from London Euston to Manchester Piccadilly in 1966, there was the opportunity for a faster electric locomotive-hauled Pullman service than the diesel sets; the Midland Pullman sets were transferred to the WR in March 1967. The introduction of new non-air conditioned Mark 1 Pullman cars on the East Coast Main Line in 1961 had been questioned, as it was believed the ER had not waited for the completion of evaluation of the Blue Pullmans. The later introduction of 2nd-class air-conditioned Mark 2 coaches on these services hastened the perception that the Pullman supplement was not value for money.

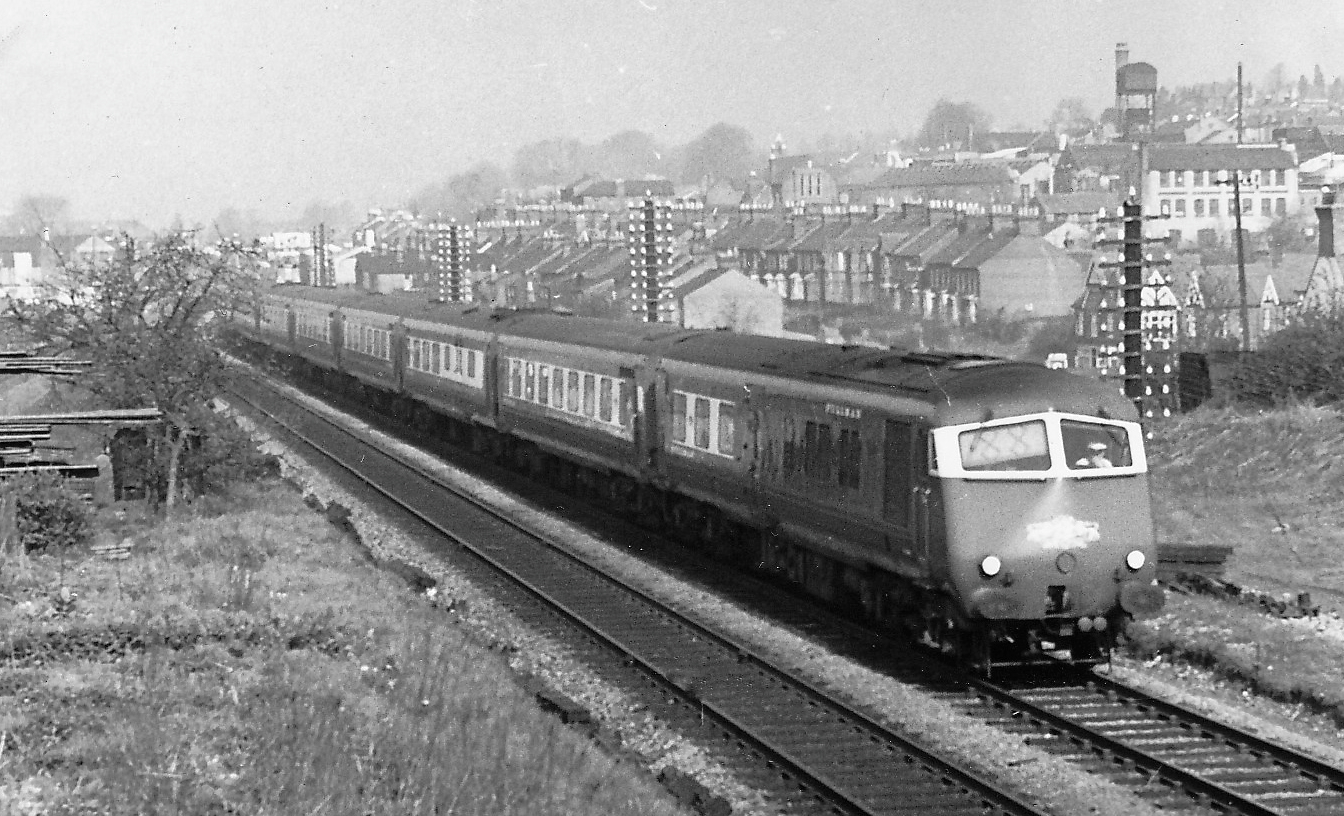
The Birmingham Pullman in 1962

The WR Birmingham Pullman ran in the morning Wolverhampton Low Level to London Paddington, via Birmingham Snow Hill and through High Wycombe, with a fill-in journey from Paddington to Birmingham Snow Hill and back, before the evening return to Wolverhampton. The Bristol Pullman ran from Bristol Temple Meads to London Paddington and back, twice in a day. The two morning services were booked to arrive at the same time at Paddington, giving the possibility of a side-by-side arrival.

From 1961, an additional morning train, the South Wales Pullman, operated from Paddington to Cardiff Central and Swansea.

With the imminent withdrawal of the Midland Pullman, one operated a trial from London King's Cross to Leeds, via the East Coast Main Line, in 1965 . However they were not introduced on this route and after the Midland Pullman ceased, the sets were transferred to the Western Region to be used on a new non-stop service for Oxford, and on additional out-and-back services on the Bristol and Swansea routes. The Birmingham services were eventually withdrawn, with the last services being to South Wales.

=== Withdrawal ===
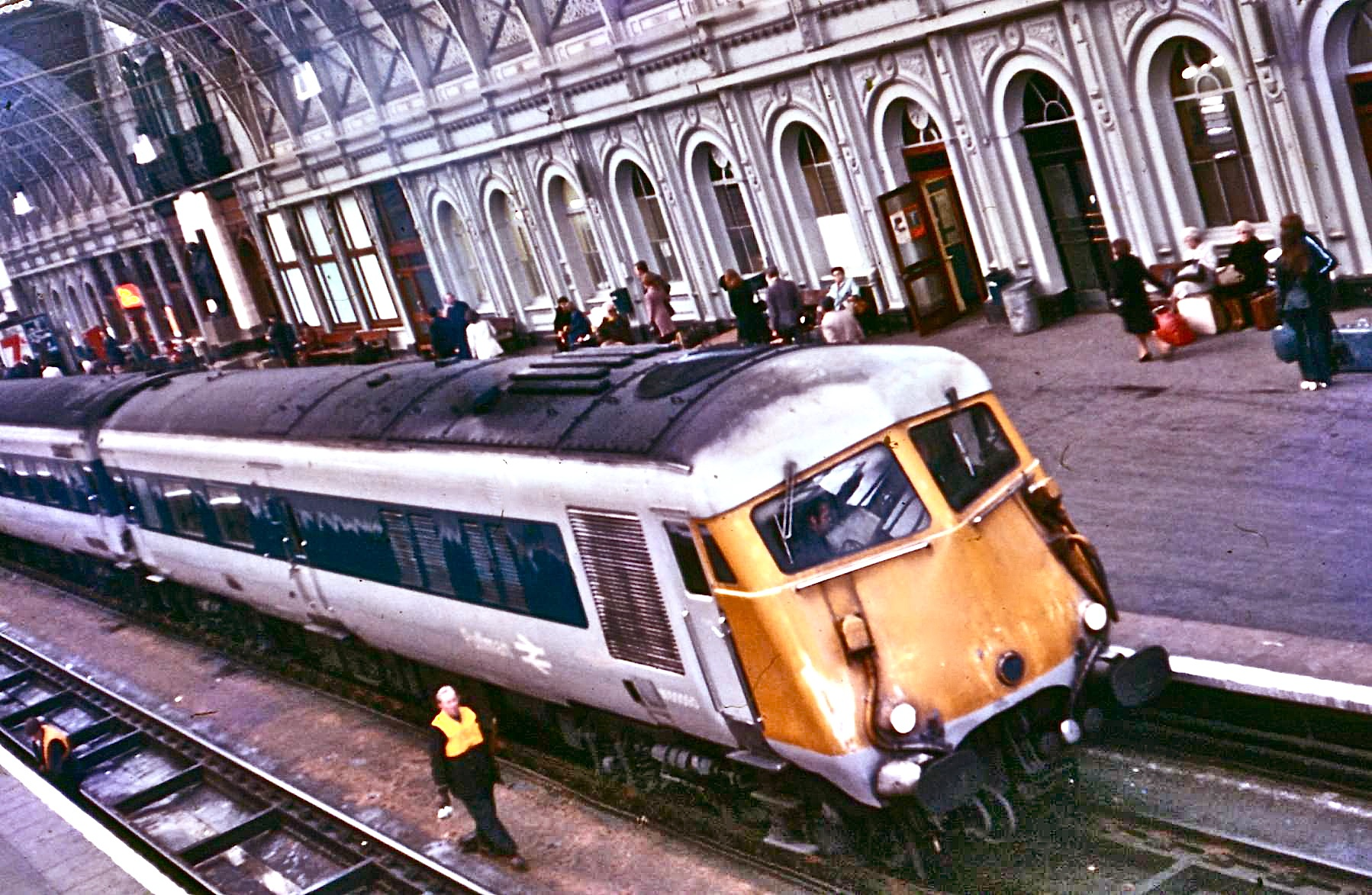
South Wales Pullman at Paddington in 1973

Towards the end of their operational life, the sets operated as three makeshift sets formed from various original cars to maintain a working service. With declining reliability, the last sets were withdrawn en masse in May 1973. A farewell commemorative special journey out and back from Paddington was run by the Western Region, travelling for 12 hours via High Wycombe, Banbury, Leamington Spa, Kenilworth, Coventry, Birmingham New Street, Cheltenham, Bristol Temple Meads, the Severn Tunnel, Swansea, Cardiff Central, Bristol Parkway, Didcot and Slough.

=== After service ===
Ten cars (six Midland and four Western) had been reportedly saved from the scrapyard in July 1975; however, none have been preserved.

Some of the motor cars were retained at Bristol Temple Meads and Bristol Bath Road TMD until mid-1974 as standby electricity generators during industrial action in the electricity and coal-mining industries.

The Irish national rail and bus operator Córas Iompair Éireann gave "serious consideration" to acquiring (and by implication, regauging by exchanging the standard gauge bogies with broad-gauge ones) the Blue Pullman sets but ultimately decided against it.

== Design ==
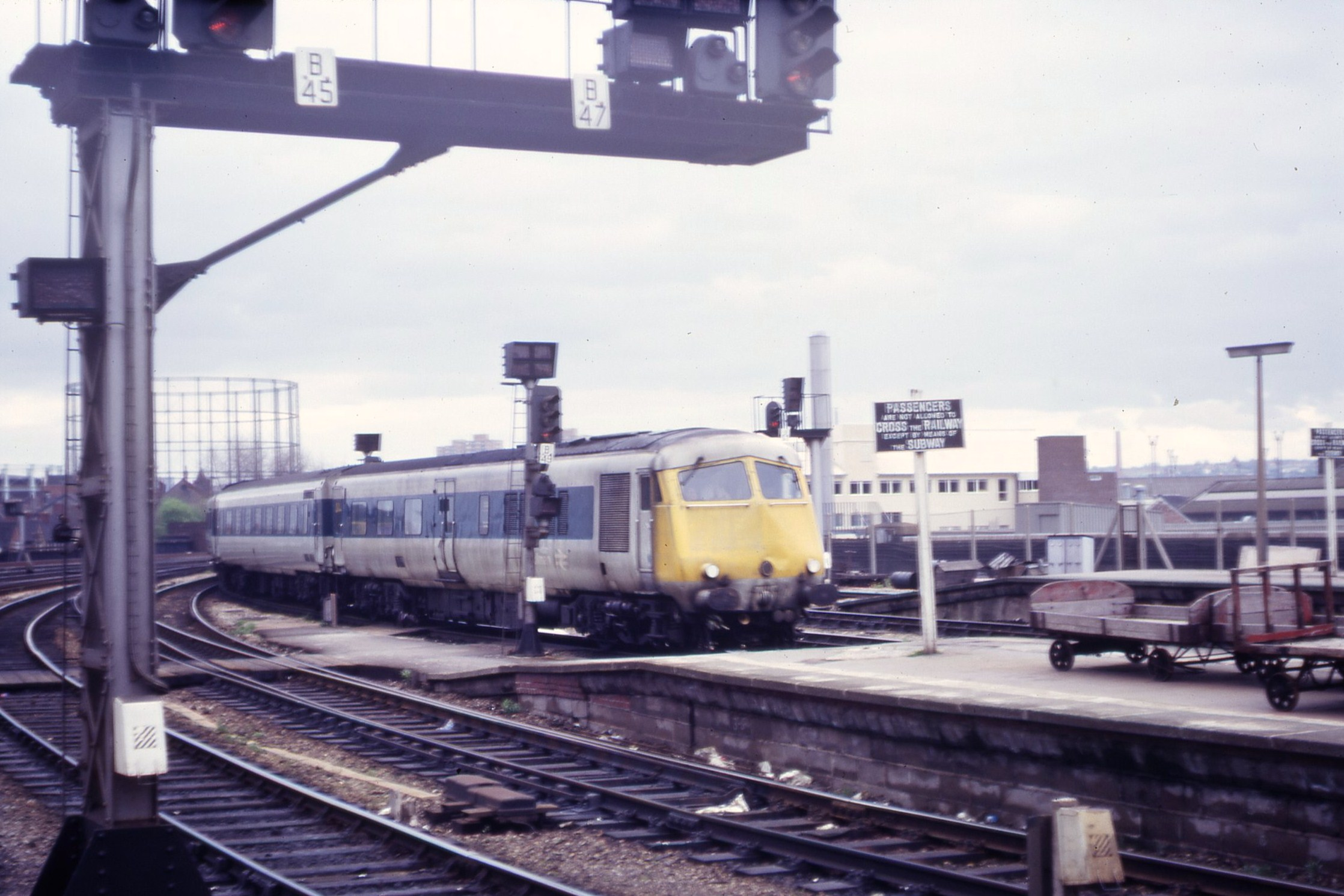
Eight-car Bristol Pullman set arriving at Bristol Temple Meads on 5 May 1973, the final day of operation

The sets had a maximum speed of 90 mph (140 km/h). The fixed couplings reduced much of the jerky movement experienced by conventionally buffered carriages and allowed smooth acceleration and stable running. The bogies had hydraulically damped helical springs and the axles were pneumatically braked in a two-stage system, allowing highly controlled stopping.

They were air-conditioned with automatic humidity control. The power cars were each fitted with 1000hp Supercharged MAN V12's along with generators for motive power, and a secondary Rolls-Royce C8NFLH diesel engine and auxiliary 150 kVA 3-phase 400 V generator beneath the floor provided power for the air-conditioning, fridges and ancillary equipment. A single auxiliary per set was normally sufficient. An onboard Travelling Maintenance Attendant monitored the supply of services.

Seating was 2+1 armchair-type around tables with a table lamp and with steward call button. The saloons were protected from track noise by extra insulation in the bodywork and double-glazed windows, with Venetian blinds between the panes.

=== Livery ===
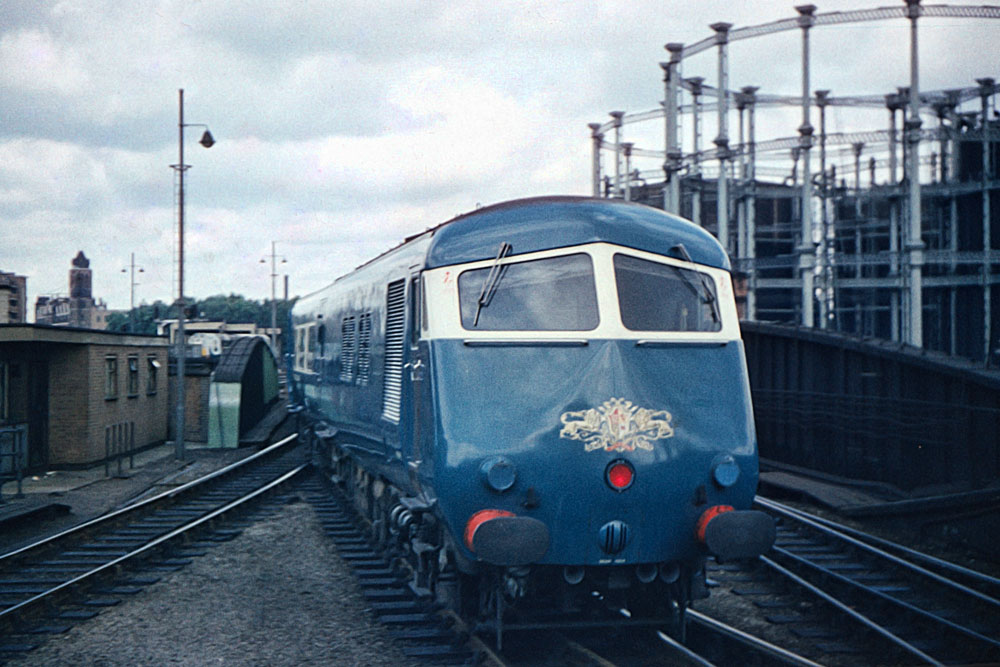
A Blue Pullman in the original Nanking blue and white livery at St Pancras

To emphasise the new type of service, a Nanking blue livery and associated brand image replaced the traditional Pullman livery of brown and cream, and cars bore the word PULLMAN rather than individual names. Seating was also different from traditional first-class Pullman cars, increasing from 1+1 to 1+2.

The original livery was Nanking blue, with white window surrounds and the Pullman crest on the front and sides. From mid-1966 full wrap-around yellow ends were applied to the driving cars. From October 1967, the sets were repainted in a reverse corporate blue and grey livery, similar to other Pullman coaches and the prototype Class 252, though some retained the Nanking blue livery into 1969.

=== Technical details ===
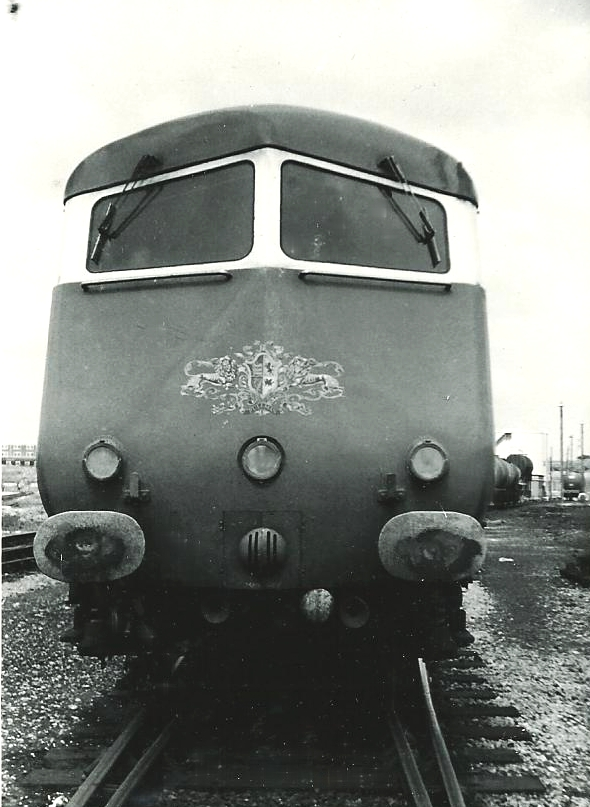
Blue Pullman at Old Oak Common TMD

Power car (one at each end of set):

- Introduced: 1960
- Weight: 67 tons 10 cwt
- Engine: NBL/MAN 1,000 bhp (750 kW)
- Main Generator 500 kW GEC
- Motors: two 199 hp (148 kW) GEC traction motors (plus two on the adjoining car)
- Maximum tractive effort: Not known
- First, second and third bogies from each end were of 9 ft 6 in wheel centres, all other inboard bogies had 8 ft 6 in centres. The four traction motors at each end were mounted on the second and third bogies.
- Driving wheel diameter: 3 ft 6 in
- Braking: Two stage Electro Pneumatic
- Coupling code: Unknown
- Train heating: Electric, powered by 190 bhp (140 kW) Rolls-Royce underfloor engine on adjoining vehicle 133 kVA 400 V 50 Hz alternator

=== Formation ===
The sets were formed from six types of car:

1. 1st class motor car, driving
2. 2nd class motor car,
3. second class parlour car with under-floor diesel generator (see train heating engine above),
4. first class kitchen car with under-floor diesel generator,
5. first class kitchen car, and
6. first class parlour car.

The cars were coupled into trains of six or eight cars. Each car was hermetically sealed for the air-conditioning and all sets were symmetrical, with two kitchen cars serving their respective half of the train. London Midland trains were formed up as [types] 1-4-6-6-4-1, whilst Western region sets ran as 2-3-5-6-6-5-3-2. In an emergency, the buffers on the front of the sets were used in conjunction with a normally concealed coupling hook.

The LMR thus operated two sets of six first-class cars, the WR three sets of eight cars. Withdrawal of the Midland Pullman allowed operation of 12-car formations. The seating in the full length of the parlour cars was augmented by seated sections in the kitchen cars, and motor cars also had a passenger compartment. Kitchen cars and Midland Pullman power cars had one toilet, parlour cars two.

== Recreations ==
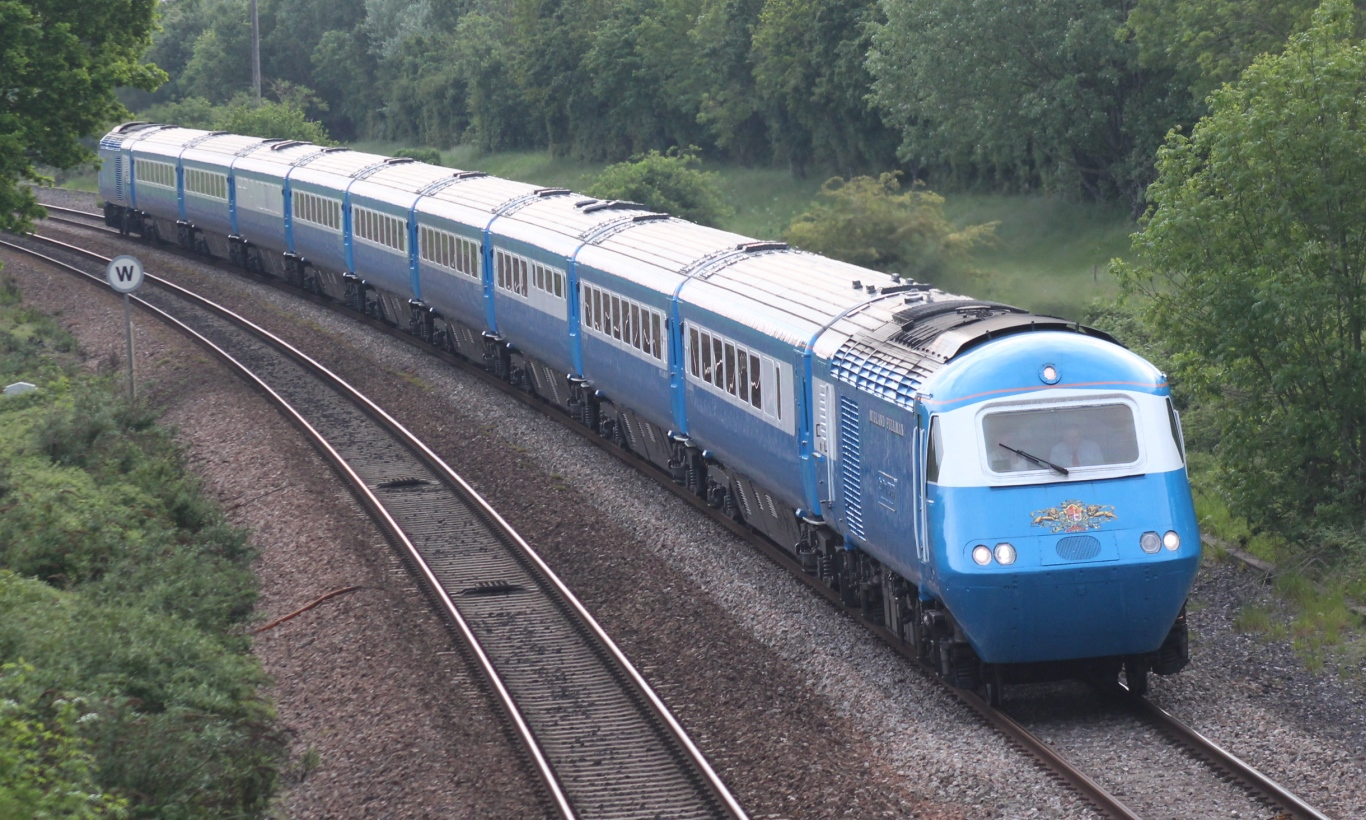
Locomotive Services' 'Blue Pullman' HST

In January 2006, charter operator FM Rail revived the Blue Pullman brand, repainting two Class 47s and a set of Mark 2 carriages into the original Nanking blue livery. After FM Rail ceased trading, they were operated by Cotswold Rail from February 2007.

In 2020, an HST set operated by Locomotive Services Ltd was repainted in replica Blue Pullman livery. The train made its inaugural run on 12 December that year, from London St Pancras to Crewe and back. LSL offers several railtours every year as the Midland Pullman.

== In film ==
The units starred in the 1960 British Transport Films Blue Pullman directed by James Ritchie, which followed their development, preparation and a journey on the train. As with earlier British Transport films, many of the personnel, scientists, engineers, crew and passengers were featured. It won several awards, including the Technical & Industrial Information section of the Festival for Films for Television in 1961. It is particularly notable for its eerie score, by Clifton Parker.

The units were the subject of the British Transport Film Let's Go To Birmingham in 1962. This was of a run from London Paddington to Birmingham Snow Hill via Leamington Spa and was largely a sped-up "cab view" film in the style of London to Brighton in Four Minutes. The driver in the film, Ernest Morris, was killed on 15 August 1963 in the Knowle and Dorridge rail crash when his express train collided with a freight train at 20 mph (32 km/h). His train was a Birmingham Pullman hauled by a Class 52 Western diesel-hydraulic locomotive, a stand-in for the regular Blue Pullman set.

In the 1963 British Transport Film Snow, there are very short passing shots of a set (5 min 9 sec and 6 min 23 sec) and two views of a LMR set with 6 intermediate cars, in panorama (5 min 10 sec to 5 min 26 sec) and from the cab of an approaching train (5 min 28 sec to 5 min 38 sec).

A Blue Pullman made brief appearances in the 1965 Norman Wisdom film The Early Bird, destroying Pitkin's milk cart at a level crossing.

== Models ==
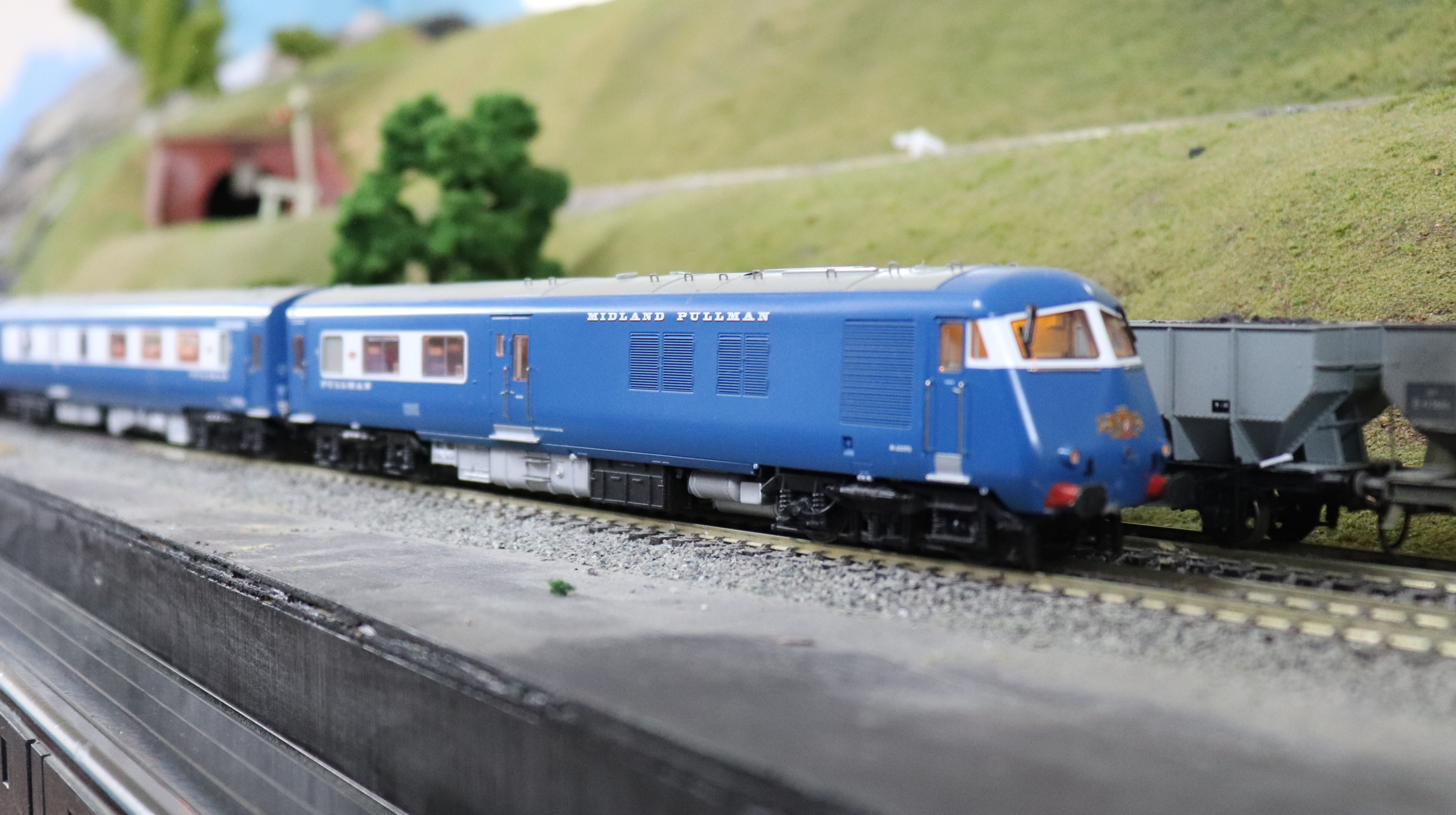
Bachmann Branchline OO scale blue Pullman power car; note the lighting in cab and passenger compartments

Kitmaster produced an unpowered polystyrene injection-moulded model kit of car types 1, 4 and 6 at 00 scale. In late 1962, the Kitmaster brand was sold by Rosebud Dolls to Airfix and it is thought the tools were destroyed in a fire, so no further kits were produced. However, examples can still be bought on eBay and the Kitmaster Collectors Club buys and resells built and unbuilt kits.

From 1964 to 1967, Tri-ang (later Tri-ang Hornby) produced ready-to-run models of the type 2 power cars and the type 6 (first class) parlour car.

No models of car types 3 or 5 were ever produced, though brass etchings to convert the window mouldings of Triang types are available, but very rare.

In May 2010, Olivia's Trains of Sheffield announced its intention to produce a ready-to-run model in association with Heljan models of Denmark. On Bachmann's announcement that it would be producing a model, the project was cancelled.

In July 2010, Bachmann Branchline announced two Nanking blue versions of the Midland Pullman, with and without full yellow wrap-around ends. The models were released in late 2012 correctly reproducing car types 1, 4 and 6. In December 2012, a British Railway Modelling review described the Bachmann model as having "exquisite detail". In June 2016, Bachmann released a collectors' edition of the Midland Pullman, which included a book about the Midland Pullman, written by Kevin Robertson, a reproduction menu card, a print of the artwork featured on the box, as well as a set of stewards and train crew figures.

In early 2013, Graham Farish introduced a British N gauge model in Nanking blue. In January 2018, Graham Farish announced planned production of versions of the Western Pullman in grey and blue livery, which was available by the following year.

== See also ==
- George Pullman
- Pullman Company (USA)
- British Rail brand names
- List of British Rail classes
