= GWR Super Saloons =

GWR Super Saloon
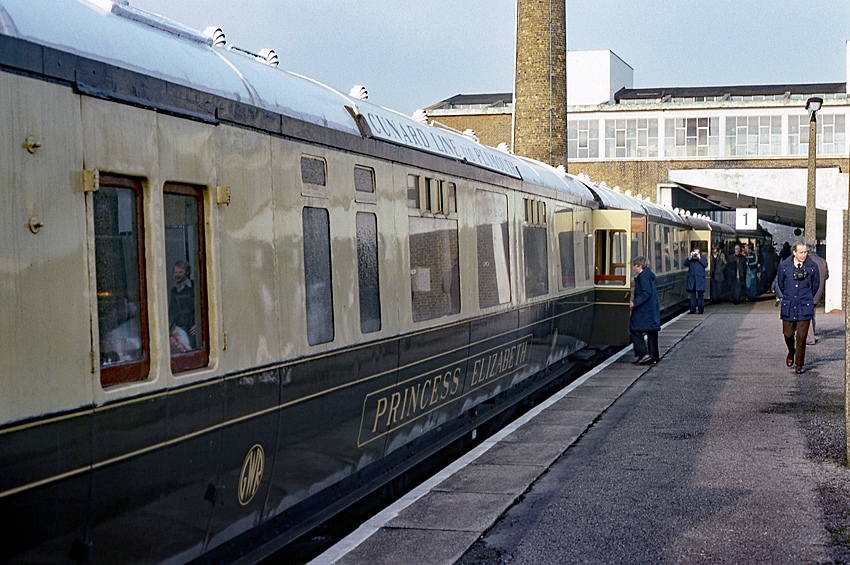
- GWR Super Saloons at Banbury
- In service: 1931–1967
- Manufacturer: Great Western Railway; Designer: Charles Collett
- Built at: Swindon Works
- Constructed: 1931–1932
- Number built: 8
- Number scrapped: 3
- Diagram: G60 (2), G61 (6)
- Fleet numbers: 9111–9118
- Operators: Great Western Railway (1931-1948); British Railways (1948-1967)
- Depots: Old Oak Common and Laira

Specifications
- Car body construction: Steel; Body-on-frame, non-integral
- Car length: 61 feet 4 1/2 inches (18.707 m)
- Width: 9 feet 7 inches (2.92 m)
- Doors: hinged slam
- Maximum speed: 100 mph (160 km/h)
- Weight: 35 long tons (36 t)
- HVAC: Steam
- Braking system(s): Automatic vacuum
- Coupling system: Drawhook
- Track gauge: 4 ft 8 1/2 in (1,435 mm)

The Great Western Railway Super Saloons were eight railway carriages developed to service the boat train traffic from London to Plymouth. Built to the maximum loading gauge to be more opulent than the rival Pullman Company coaches offered by rival railway companies, and all named after members of the British royal family, their success was short-lived due to the onset of the Great Depression of the 1930s. Taken out of service by British Rail in 1967, today five of the original carriages survive in preservation.

== Background ==
The original backers of the GWR had adopted Isambard Kingdom Brunel's plan to speed trans-Atlantic Ocean passage for both passengers and freight by providing a direct route from London westwards to the connecting ports located in the West Country and Wales. However, many of the financial backers were based in Bristol, itself a major port, and so although the company eventually developed Brunel's plan, the only major high-speed railway connection was eventually developed to Plymouth.

Post-World War I and with the United States now economically booming, new developments in Ocean Liner design and construction brought about new, faster ships with more luxury capacity. These nouveau-riche first-class passengers were used to speed, quality and service; mixing with commuters and third class passengers, let alone mail and freight, was not what they wanted. What the new passengers required were high-speed dedicated boat train services.

As a result, from the mid-1920s a new race to attract the Ocean Liners and hence these passengers began between the Southern Railway and the GWR. Although the GWR had access to Southampton Docks via a circuitous route, the company decided to instead focus on developing services from Plymouth. Effectively, this would save ocean liners 6 hours of steaming in the crowded English Channel, and reduce the overall travel time by 4 hours. By 1930, 684 liners had landed 38,472 passengers at Plymouth, with the vast majority being trans-Atlantic customers who then needed transport to London.

=== Pullman carriages ===
The GWR was reluctant to use Pullman Carriages, considering its own carriages luxurious enough. However, in 1928 the GWR board approved the lease from Pullman Company of seven cars - four Kitchen Cars and three Parlour Cars, No's 252-258 - with construction subcontracted to Metropolitan Cammell in Birmingham. Initially deployed from May 1929 on the London Paddington-Plymouth Millbay service, amongst standard GWR stock within the Ocean Liner Express boat train. These trains were also known as the "Cunarders", as Cunard were the main shipping company that docked their trans-Atlantic services in the port.

From 8 July 1929, the Pullman cars were deployed in a new train the Torquay Pullman Limited, an all-Pullman service which ran two days a week between London Paddington and Paignton, stopping at Newton Abbot and Torquay only. Not a commercial success, the train returned for the 1930 timetable as a 3 car only service, but was withdrawn at the end of the summer timetable, with the carriages stored at Old Oak Common. A proposal was made to return the full seven car train in summer 1931, but the decision was taken not to operate the service.

== Development ==
In 1929, under the auspicies of Chief Mechanical Engineer Charles Collett, the GWR board agreed development from 1929 of a new, bigger carriage for the Ocean trains. Due to the GWR's original adoption of broad gauge, its loading gauge using standard gauge track was larger than any other mainland UK railway. This allowed the company to develop a larger bespoke carriage to its own dimensions, which would be wider than the Pullman saloons then in operation on both the Great Western and Southern Railways.

Collett made full use of the loading gauge advantage, designing a basic carriage shape that was 61 feet 4.5 inches (18.707 m) in length and 9 feet 7 inches (2.92 m) wide—a full 7 inches (180 mm) wider than a standard British loading gauge carriage. The result was that the Swindon Works designated "Super Saloons"—which also became known as "Ocean Saloons" and "Cunarders" in service operation—were restricted to the mainline of the GWR that had been originally developed as broad gauge. Hence, each carriage had painted on its end plate:

Not to run over the Eastern and Western Valleys, North of Saltney Junction or between Littlemill Junction and Maindee Junction.

Collett had also designed-in a clearance insurance policy, by designing the carriages with inset end doors which were angled at 30 degrees to the exterior body panels.

All Super Saloons were built within Swindon Works Lot No. 1471, the first two carriages fitted out by specialist contractor Trollope & Co. under Diagram G.60 in 1931, whilst the remaining six were all fitted out by the Swindon Works Saloon Gang under Diagram G.61 in 1932. Initially the windows were of a wind-down Beclawat type, but these were replaced in 1935 by fixed windows of more modern type with sliding vents. Once the exterior was completed, each of the carriages was fitted-out with fine French-polished light-coloured walnut, with book-matched burr veneer panels on the interior sliding doors and fold-down tables, outlined with gold-leaf hairlines. Each carriage was then equipped with 30 loose (but heavy, to prevent them from moving during the journey) wing-back chairs: 26 in saloon; 4 in coupé. The complete run of eight carriages, all named after members of the British royal family were as opulent as the Pullmans they replaced, and had an unladen weight of 35 long tons (36 t).

With the Super Saloons now fully available for traffic, the lease on the seven Pullman cars was terminated at the end of 1931, and these were transferred to the Southern Railway, joining the SR's Western Section carriage pool at Clapham Junction. The legacy of the Super Saloons included Collett's 1935 development of the new "Centenary" carriages built for the Cornish Riviera Express, which again made full use of the wider loading gauge on that route.

== Operations ==
Introduced in 1931, the Ocean Liner Express ran non-stop in each direction between London Paddington and Plymouth Millbay. Passengers were charged a full first-class fare as appropriate for their journey, plus a one-way tariff of 10 shillings to use the carriages.

Due to their weight, commonly only five Super Saloons were operated in one train at any one time, together with two passenger brake vans to accommodate passengers' luggage. Often, the trains were reduced to three Super Saloons and two passenger brake vans, allowing the train to run at higher speed. The Ocean Liner Express was always banked both ways over the Devon and Wellington Banks.

=== Decline ===
Although a relative financial success initially, the launch of the Ocean Super Saloons and their dedicated trains coincided with the start of the Great Depression. Consequently, the number and frequency of trains was reduced, whilst the shipping companies ran their passenger liners at slower speeds to consume less fuel, and hence speed became less of a deciding factor in choice of route. As Southampton developed as the south coast passenger port of choice, Plymouth declined in importance as a passenger port, although Royal Navy officers and the gentry from Cornwall became regular customers on the Ocean Liner expresses.

The GWR looked for new uses for their Super Saloons, and began using them on specialist dining trains to Newbury Racecourse, as well as on private-charter traffic. Post-World War II, British Railways continued this usage pattern, and once the carriages were painted in the new crimson and cream livery in the early 1950s, they all lost their royal names. The last dedicated Ocean Express using the Super Saloons ran in September 1962, when the standard formation of the train was: Full Brake–-Brake Composite–-Super Saloon–Kitchen Restaurant–Super Saloon–Super Saloon–Full Brake.

== Preservation ==
Five of the eight Super Saloons have survived into preservation:

| Number | Name | Location | Status | Notes |
|---|---|---|---|---|
| 9111 | King George | South Devon Railway | Operational | Bought direct from BR by the South Devon Railway Association, it arrived at Buckfastleigh in 1967. Forms one-half of the SDR dining train with 9116. |
| 9112 | Queen Mary | Didcot Railway Centre | Preserved | Second carriage built and brought into operations, it was fitted out internally by contractors Trollope & Co. One of three bought by the Great Western Society direct from BR in 1967, they were all moved to Didcot in 1976. Used with 9118 as part of the "Wine & Dine" facility until the end of the 1980s. In the queue to be restored, but after 9113 and 9118. |
| 9113 | Prince of Wales | Didcot Railway Centre | Under Restoration | The third carriage built, and the first fitted out by Swindon Works Saloon Gang. One of three bought by the Great Western Society direct from BR in 1967, they were all moved to Didcot in 1976. Structurally sound it is currently being substantially rebuilt so that it can be returned to service. |
| 9114 | Duke of York | | Scrapped | |
| 9115 | Duke of Gloucester | | Scrapped | |
| 9116 | Duchess of York | South Devon Railway | Operational | Bought direct from BR by the South Devon Railway Association, it arrived at Buckfastleigh in 1967. Now owned by the South Devon Railway Trust, it forms one-half of the SDR dining train with 9111. |
| 9117 | Princess Royal | | Scrapped | |
| 9118 | Princess Elizabeth | Didcot Railway Centre | Preserved | Originally configured with two open-plan saloons, to avoid the need to provide a full kitchen car when the saloon's were used for hire to private hire, in 1937 the coupé and one lavatory were removed to allow fitment of a small kitchen, which is still operational. One of three bought by the Great Western Society direct from BR in 1967, they were all moved to Didcot in 1976. Used with 9112 as part of the "Wine & Dine" facility until the end of the 1980s. Awaiting restoration behind 9113. |
