= Brake van =

Non-revenue wagon used on trains with or without continuous braking

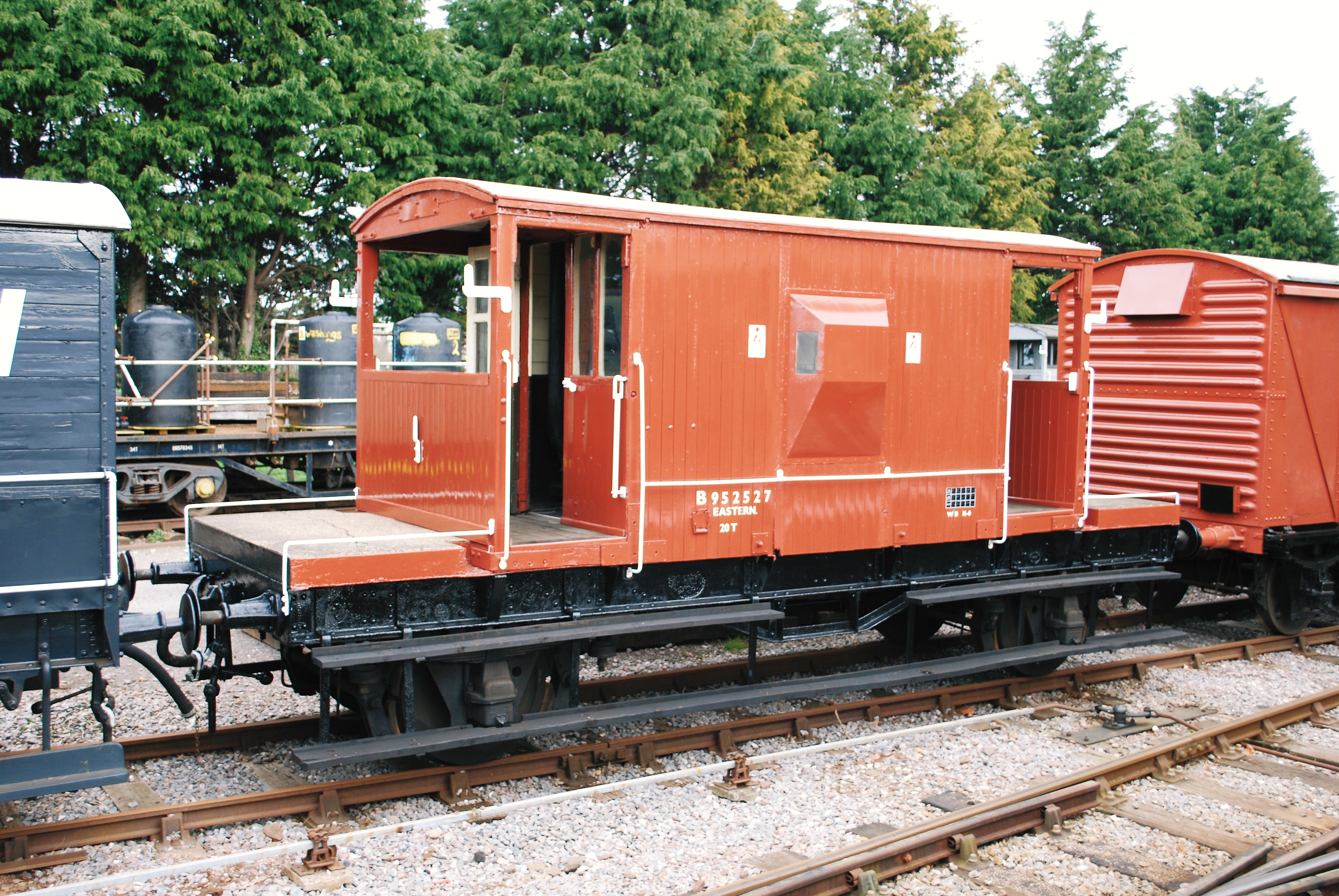
British Railways "standard" brake van

Brake van and guard's van are terms used mainly in the UK, Ireland, Australia, and India for a railway vehicle equipped with a hand brake which can be applied by the guard. The equivalent North American term is caboose, but a British brake van and an American caboose are very different in appearance and use. A brake van usually has only four wheels, while a caboose usually has bogies. Further, cabooses are not used to provide braking on a train, but instead once served as a mobile office for the conductor and the brakemen who helped monitor the train. German railways employed brakeman's cabins that were combined into other cars.

Many British freight trains formerly had no continuous brake, so the only available brakes were those on the locomotive and the brake van. Because of this shortage of brake power, the speed was restricted to 25 mph (40 km/h). The brake van was marshalled at the rear of the train so both portions of the train could be brought to a stand in the event of a coupling breaking.

When freight trains were fitted with continuous braking, brake vans lost their importance and were discontinued by many railways. However, they still operate on some important railways, such as Indian Railways, as well as on heritage railways.

== Origin ==
Railways were a formalised development of industrial tramways, which, on occasion, had to add braking capacity by attaching an empty truck to the rear of a group of tramcars. This allowed the "locomotive" — often a cableway powered by a steam engine at the surface — to operate both safely and, more importantly, at higher speed.

The first railways, such as the pioneering Liverpool and Manchester Railway of 1830, used a version of the tramway buffer-and-chain coupling, termed a screw coupling. Vehicles are coupled by hand using a hook and links with a turnbuckle-like device that draws the vehicles together. Vehicles have buffers, one at each corner on the ends, which are pulled together and compressed by the coupling device. With no continuous brake across the entire train, the whole train was reliant on the braking capacity of the locomotive, and train lengths were restricted.

To allow for longer trains, early railway companies from the 1840s onwards began replicating industrial tramway practises by adding "break vans". The term was derived from their name on the industrial tramways, in which they controlled the (residual) train if there was a "break" in the linkage to the locomotive. Early railway couplings was prone to breakages. The term was only replaced by "brake van" from the 1870s onwards.

Because of the combined risks of shortage of brake power and breaking couplings, the speed of freight trains was initially restricted to 25 mph (40 km/h). The brake van was marshalled at the rear of the train, and served two purposes:

- Provided additional braking for 'unfitted' goods trains
- Put a man (the guard) at the rear of the train, who could take action in the event of a breakdown or accident

While the UK railway system persisted until post-nationalisation in 1948 with "unfitted" (discontinuously braked) trains and loose couplings (the final unfitted trains ran in the 1990s), other systems, such as North America's adoption of the Janney coupler, addressed the same railway safety issues differently.

== The guard's duties ==
On unfitted trains, the brake van has several purposes and, hence, several jobs for the guard: operating the brake, supervising the train, and providing illumination and communication.

Firstly, and most importantly, the guard would use the brake van's brakes to help keep the train under control on downward gradients and whenever they saw that the locomotive crew was attempting to slow the train. Route knowledge would allow the guard to initiate the braking before the driver. To aid in this, signalling regulations mandated that signals be left at clear until the entire train (including the guard's van) had passed, as the guard would immediately apply the brakes upon seeing a signal at danger.

Secondly, they minimized the risk of snapped broken couplings by application of the handbrake wheel, which would keep otherwise-loose screw couplings taut between unfitted wagons. This helped mitigate the risk of a coupling failure from uneven acceleration ("snatching" or jerking). This was particularly a problem as locomotives became more powerful. Because coupling failures were a fairly common occurrence when starting an unfitted train, train crews were given specific instructions upon starting a freight train that the footplate crew look back towards the brake van for a signal from the guard (by flag or lamp) that the entire train was moving. All couplings were taut before accelerating to higher speeds.

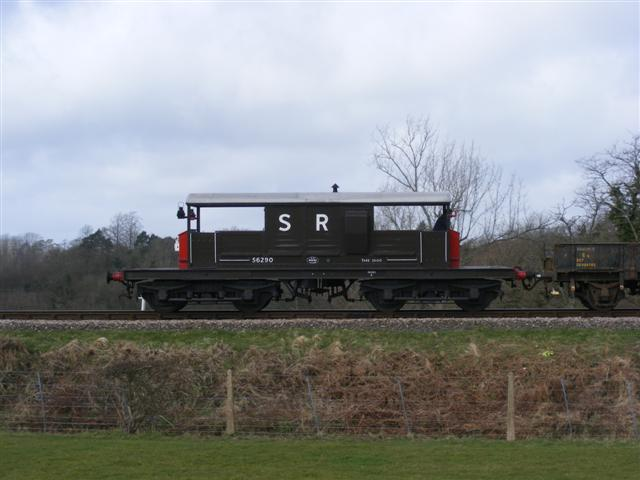
Preserved SR "Queen Mary" bogie brake van - most British brake vans had just four wheels and a rigid wheelbase. This one has all three side lamps visible.

A later job for the guard was to provide side lamps on brake vans. The white lamp is the tail lamp, whilst the grey lamps are the side lamps, along with the standard tail lamp (showing red to the rear and sides) required on the rear of every train. The side lamps showed a white light towards the front and a red light to the side/rear. The front-facing lamps indicated to the locomotive crew that the train was still complete, whilst the provision of extra red lights at the rear was an additional safety measure. Due to the very low chance of all three lights being out at once, it was stipulated that a freight train passing without any lamps on the rear had split, and that the rear portion was potentially running away. These side lamps were used on passenger trains before the adoption of continuous braking.

Another purpose of these side lamps was to alter the colour of their illumination. Because a removable filter provided the red indication, a white light could be shown to the rear of the train when needed. This could be used to indicate to a train on a parallel, faster line that the slower freight train showing the white light was travelling in the same direction but on another line, posing no danger of collision. The white lamp would be on the side closest to the faster-running line and would be deployed on relief or slow lines where faster-running lines ran parallel with no more than one intervening line, or on loops or refuge sidings next to running lines. In an emergency, the guard could attract the attention of other railway staff by reversing these side lights, so that red lights shone forward to alert the locomotive crew and any other railway staff who saw them.

== Country overview ==
=== Great Britain ===
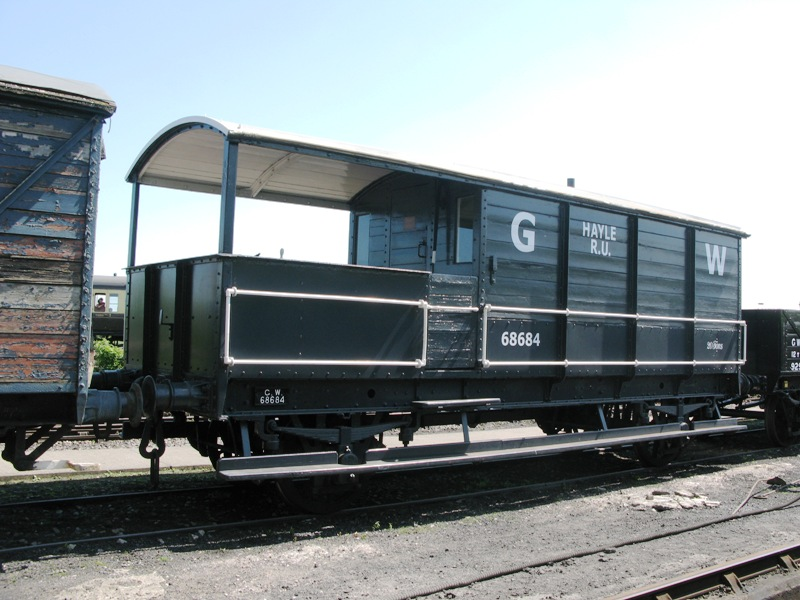
A "toad" brake van of the Great Western Railway

==== Past ====
In Great Britain, freight trains without a continuous braking system throughout the train or in the rearmost section ("unfitted" or "partly fitted", respectively, in UK railway parlance) were still prevalent in the 1970s but were mostly eliminated by the 1980s.

Early brake vans were heavily weighted, adapted open freight wagons, equipped with an externally mounted, hand-operated brake that acted on all four wheels. The term brake van began to be adopted from the 1870s onwards, when bespoke-designed vehicles had a specific hut added to house the guard away from the weather. In keeping with tradition, most brake vans had an open area, but from the 1870s onwards, this "veranda" became partly enclosed with the addition of a roof. Some vans were fully enclosed but equipped with windows at each end, allowing the guard to view the entire train.

All operating equipment, specifically the brakes and sandboxes for improved traction, was located in the open area of the brake van. Brakes were normally controlled using a hand wheel mounted within the veranda, although some early designs continued with an externally mounted shaft. To improve the guard's visibility, many were fitted with look-outs on the roof, but side look-outs (termed "duckets") were the more common. The North Eastern Railway, Great Central Railway, London, Brighton and South Coast Railway, and the Lancashire and Yorkshire Railway all built brake vans with a raised look-out at one end of the roof.

Two issues always added to brake power: wheels and weight. Hence, many companies tried both approaches to improve their brake vans. Brake vans often had a significant amount of ballast, in the form of concrete, cast iron, or water tanks built into their structure, to increase the available braking effort.

Whilst most brake vans had two axles with four wheels, many railway companies built brake vans with three axles and six wheels. The Great Northern Railway built a few eight-wheelers for very heavy coal trains, the only rigid eight-wheeler brake vans built in the UK. In the 1930s, the London, Midland and Scottish Railway (LMS) built three bespoke twin-bogied vans (four axles, eight wheels), for use on a particular branch line, where they replaced pairs of four-wheeled vans. The design covered the entire chassis length, with two extended verandas on either side of a cabin equipped with twin duckets.

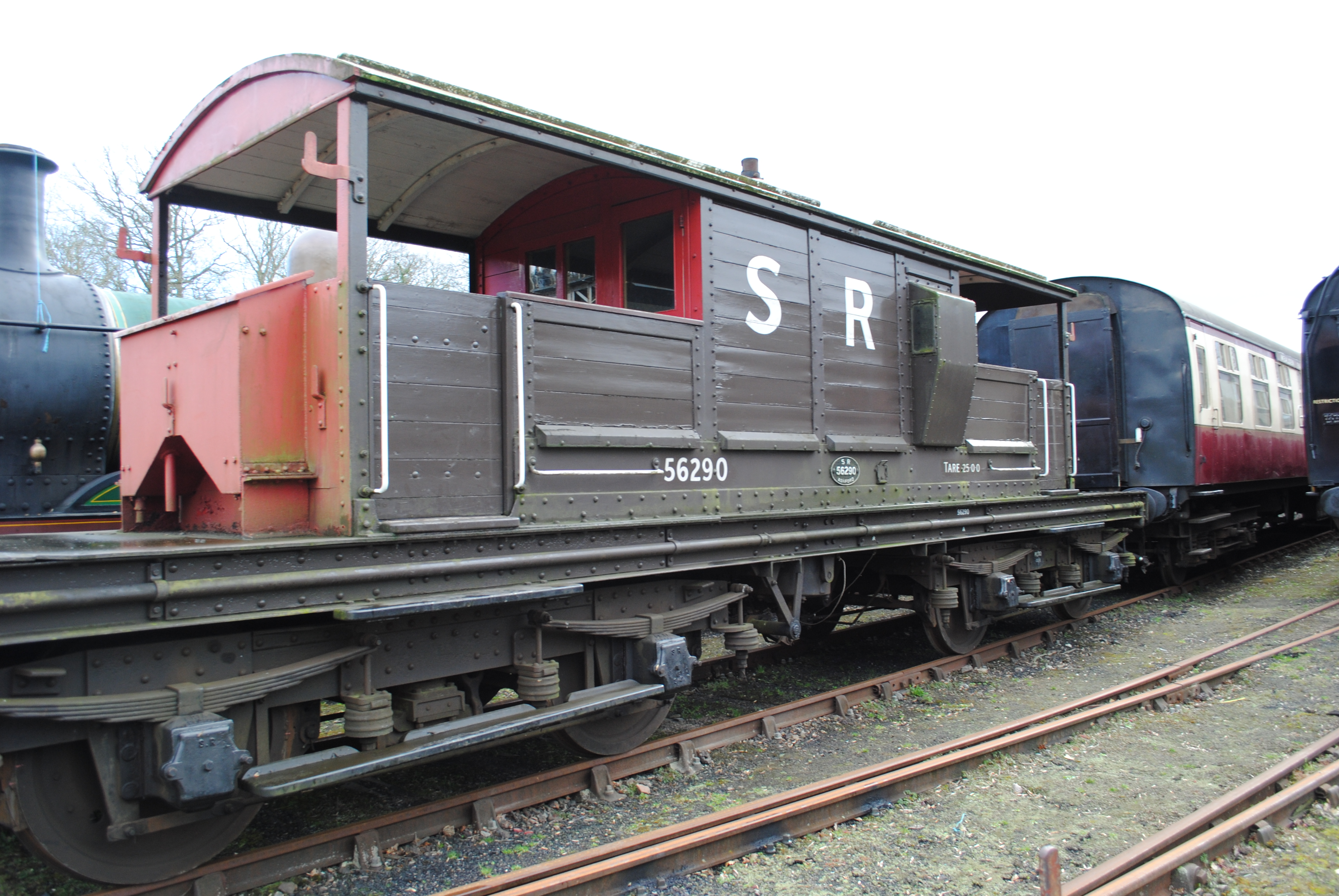
Southern Railway "Queen Mary" bogie brake van

To further improve braking, some LMS and LNER brake vans were fitted with vacuum brakes in addition to their normal brakes, which the guard could operate. Almost all War Department brake vans were fitted with vacuum cylinders, as they were exclusively used on ammunition trains. The Southern Railway built 46 twin-bogie brake vans: the first 21 on redundant electric locomotive chassis, termed the "Gondola" brake vans; and the last 25 on new chassis, termed the "Queen Mary" brake vans. Designed for high-speed operation on milk and parcels trains rather than stopping power, they had a lengthened cabin. Still, they did not cover the entire twin-bogie chassis.

==== Equipment and Furniture ====
Equipment carried aboard the brake van, which had to be checked by the guard before the train's departure, consisted of:

- A shunting pole: a wooden pole about 6 feet long with a twisted hook on the end, which was used to couple and uncouple 3-link and instanter couplings without the guard having to position himself dangerously in between the vehicles,
- At least 2 "sprags": A section of wood designed to be shoved into gaps in the side of a railway wagon wheel, that physically prevents the wheel from rotating, effectively immobilizing a wagon. They were often used during shunting operations, or when wagons needed to be detached from a train as a means to prevent runaways.
- Brake stick: similar in shape to a square-ended baseball bat, and used to lever down the handbrakes of wagons by placing it under the solebar and applying downward pressure.
- Track circuit clips: A pair of metal spring clips connected by a wire used on lines with track circuits to indicate to the signalman that a train is occupying that section. They would be used in the event of an accident in which other running lines were fouled, and trains on them had to be stopped as a matter of great urgency.
- A set of red and green signalling flags,
- At least 12 detonators (fog signals),
- Various lamps: A guard would ensure they were carried, filled, trimmed, and ready for use where required by railway rules.
  - Hand lamp: A lamp kept inside the brake van that was required to be lit at night, during fog or falling snow, in long tunnels, or in any other location ordered by the Operating Superintendent,
  - Tail lamp: A lamp mounted on the center of the brake van, that displayed a red light to anyone viewing the train from behind, such as a following train, indicating that there was a train, enabling signallers to confirm the train was complete.
  - Side lamps: Two lamps were mounted on either side of a brake van. The lamps showed a white lamp forward to enable the engine crew to see that the train was complete, and either a red or white light to the rear. (The rear-facing color depended on the location of the train in multi-track situations.)

These checks were part of the guard's train preparation duties and their responsibility. The guard would also ensure that the van carried coal and kindling to light the stove fire, even in summer, if the train was to be relieved by another crew who might have to work into the cool of evening or night. It was common for guards to carry old newspapers with which to stop up any draughts that made their presence felt at speed; partly fitted freight trains might run up to 60 mph (97 km/h).

Other features of the van's interior included a coal stove for the guard's heating and cooking needs, above which was a rail with hooks for drying wet clothing. Furniture would consist of padded seating, with pads at shoulder height to protect the guard from the inevitable jolts and jerks ('snatches') of freight work, at the duckets; the guard would sit here for protection while the train was moving, unless necessary. The guard could reach the brake wheel from that position. This padded seat would be on top of a bench locker that stretched along one side of the van and half of the other (the side with the stove). A further padded seat was provided at the end of this bench locker, where a small desk was available for the guard to perform any necessary written work.

==== Decline ====
In 1968, the requirement for fully fitted freight trains to end with a guard's van was lifted. By this time, nearly all steam locomotives had been withdrawn, and most of the standard-design British Railways diesel and electric locomotives which replaced them had cabs at both ends. The guard was therefore allowed to ride in the rearmost locomotive cab, which gave a good view of the whole train. There being in consequence no operational need for so many brake vans, many types were withdrawn. In 1985, the rail unions agreed to single-man operation of some freight services, and for the first time in over 150 years, trains were operated without a guard on board. Nevertheless, brake vans were required on trains carrying dangerous chemicals until the late 1990s.

==== Present ====
The requirement to use brake vans on trains in Great Britain was formally removed in 2021 with changes to the formal rules for freight train operation (colloquially known as the 'White Pages').

In the years immediately before that, brake vans were deemed necessary only by the HM Railway Inspectorate or Network Rail in certain special cases, for example, on trains with unusual cargoes or on track maintenance trains. The nearest equivalent to a brake van still in use on main-line British railways is the driving van trailer (DVT), which is used on locomotive-hauled trains to control the locomotive from the other end of the train in a push-pull configuration, removing the need for the locomotive to run around its train at termini. Although the DVT has braking capability of its own, this is incidental, as the vehicle's primary purpose is to allow the train to be driven from the opposite end to the locomotive and to provide accommodation for bulky luggage.

Brake vans are still a common sight on many heritage railways. On occasion, multiple brake vans will be coupled together in what is known as a "brake van special" for people to ride in.

=== Australia ===
In Australia, brake vans (or guard vans; both terms were in common use) were often also used to carry parcels and light freight, and usually had large compartments and loading doors for such items. Some of the larger vans also included a compartment for passengers travelling on goods services or for drovers travelling with their livestock.

==== Cane railways ====
Sugar cane railways in Queensland sometimes have radio-controlled brake vans. The wagons in these trains are unfitted and have no continuous brake pipes.

=== India ===
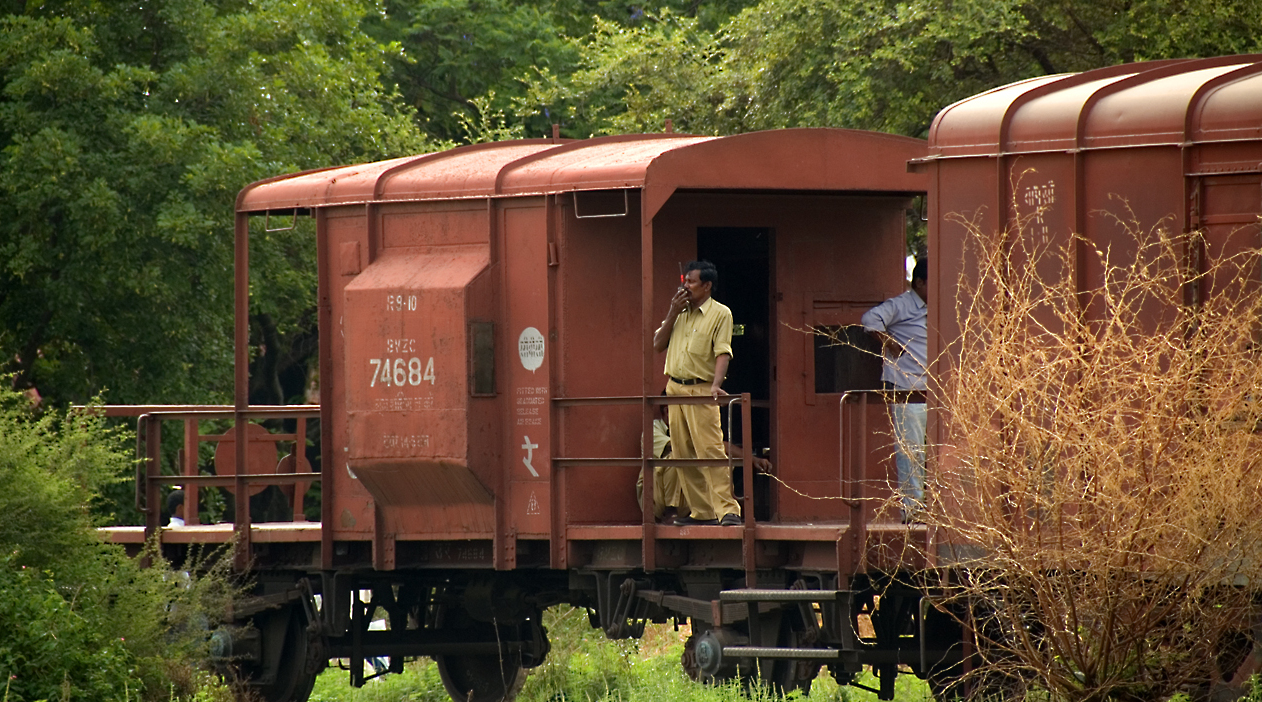
Indian goods brake van with four wheels (BVZC)

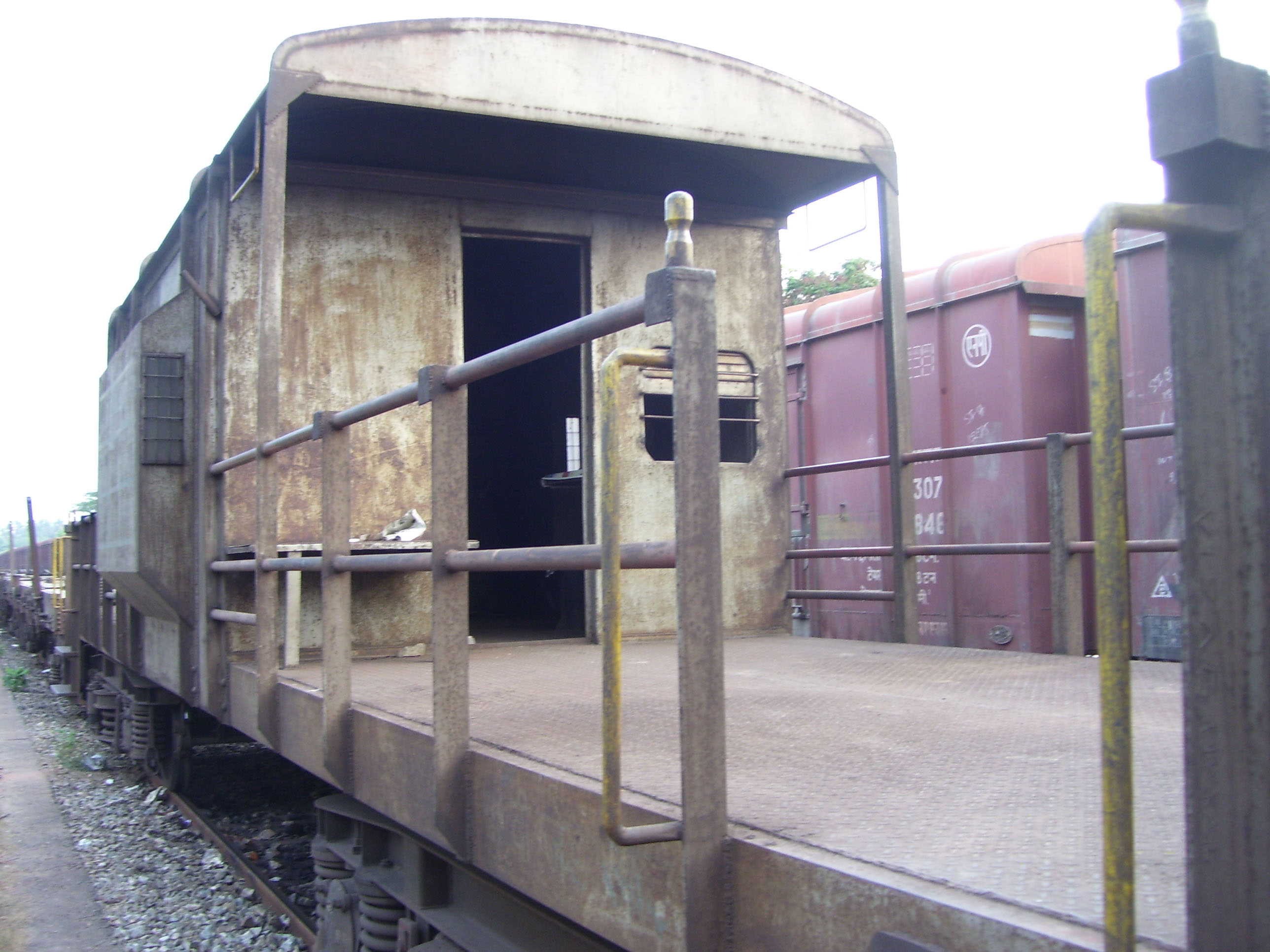
Indian goods brake van with eight wheels (BVZI)

On Indian Railways, brake vans are still in use to a great extent on freight (goods) trains and on some passenger trains.

The brake van in passenger trains (usually the first and last coaches) is a type of coach. It consists of an enclosed room/cabin with two small seats facing each other, one seat with a writing table for the guard to assist with writing and working on his train, and the opposite seat is a spare. The van also has a small lavatory. A special feature of the passenger brake van is a small dog box where passengers can carry their pets while travelling in the same train in a different coach. The guard generally remains responsible for the water and pet food while the train is in motion, and the dog box is designed to allow this. The brake van also contains a stretcher, an emergency train lighting box, and a stand to hold the lamp signal during the night. The vacuum or air pressure gauge is mounted in front of the guard's seat with a lever to operate it in case of emergency. The hand brake can be used in case of a high emergency. The remaining part of the coach consists of space for carrying parcels and small goods. It also has seating for ladies or people with disabilities (wheelchair-friendly).

The goods brake van is less attractive, is generally the last vehicle on the train, open on both sides, and does not necessarily have interior lighting/lamps. Still, it does house a small lavatory seat for the guards, owing to their long hours on freight trains. The van is less secure and has fewer features than a passenger brake van. Eight-wheeled brake vans were recently introduced to improve the guards' riding comfort.

== Passenger brake van ==
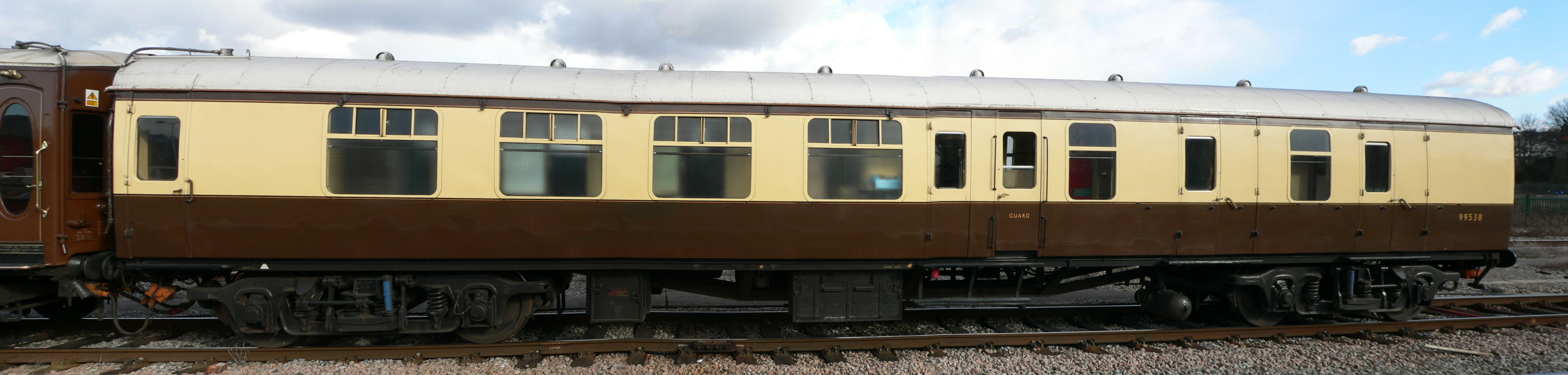
British Rail Mark 1 coach with passenger compartments (left) and brake/luggage area (right)

A passenger brake van was a combine car originally designed to serve the same purpose as a goods brake van, but, when continuous brakes became standard on passenger trains, its use changed. The van may have equipment to apply continuous brakes in an emergency, if fitted alongside the hand brake, for when the train is parked without a locomotive present. The vehicle also provides a compartment for the guard, a luggage compartment, and sometimes passenger accommodation.

=== Examples ===
Examples of British passenger brake vans include:

- Brake Gangwayed
- Brake Standard Open
- Brake Standard Open (Micro-Buffet)

=== Support coaches ===
In the UK, converted British Railways Mark 1 passenger brake vans are used as the basis for preserved steam locomotive support coaches.

== See also ==
- Baggage car/luggage van
- Brakeman's cabin
- Brake tender
- Caboose
- Crew car
