= Brake Standard Open (Micro-Buffet) =

Type of Railway Carriage

British Rail Brake Standard Open (Micro-Buffet)
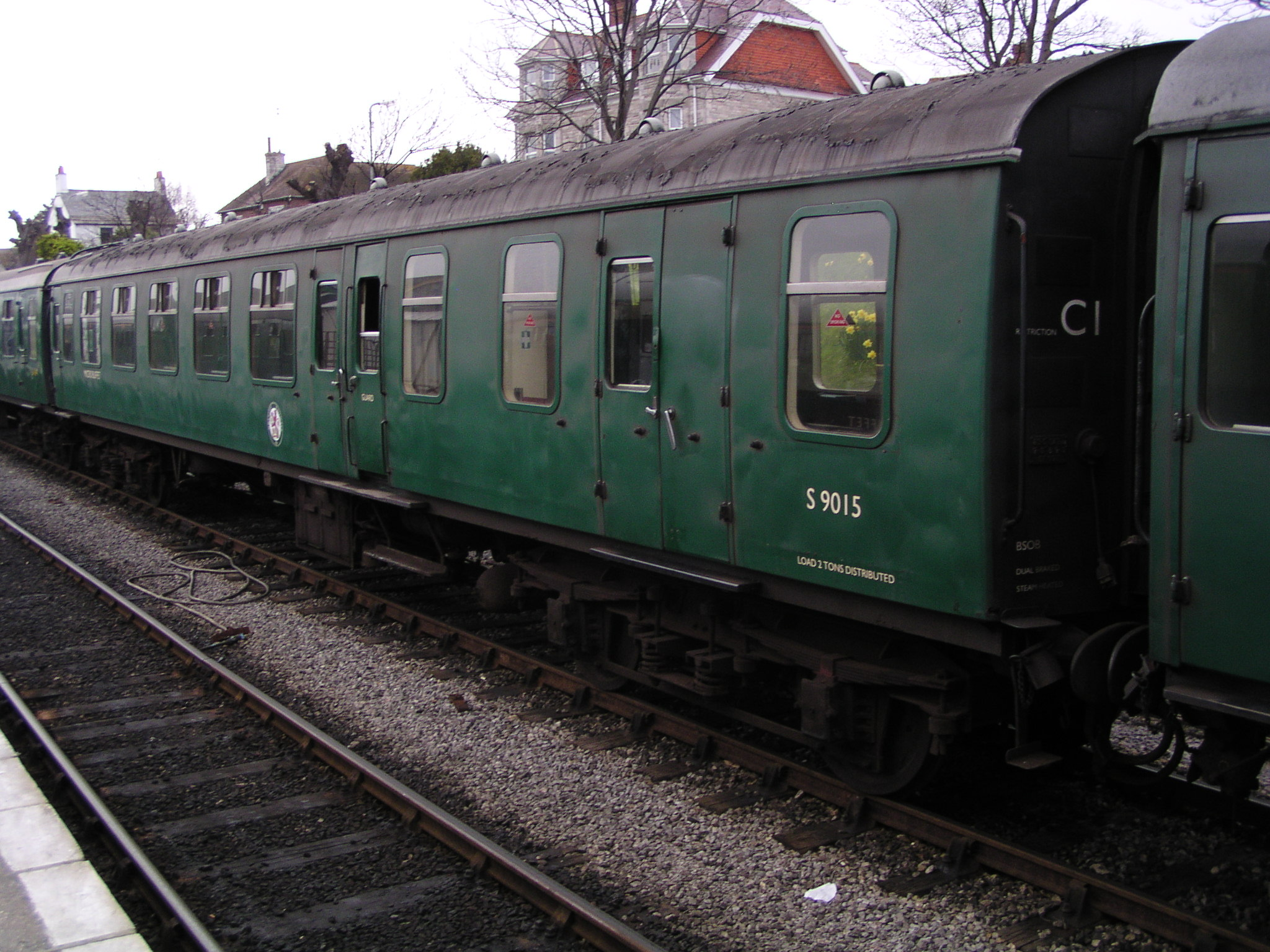
- BR Mk 1 BSOT, no. 9015 at Swanage on 13 April 2006. This coach is preserved on the Swanage Railway and is painted in Southern Region coaching stock green. It was converted from BSO 9229.
- In service: 1952–
- Manufacturers: Mark 1: BR Doncaster & Wolverton, Mark 2: BR Derby
- Number built: Mark 1: 18, Mark 2: 8
- Fleet numbers: Mark 1: 9000-9017, Mark 2: 9100-9107
- Capacity: Mark 1: 31 seats, Mark 2: 23 seats
- Operator: British Rail

Specifications
- Car length: 64 ft 6 in (19.66 m)
- Width: 9 ft 3 in (2.82 m)
- Height: 12 ft 9 1/2 in (3.90 m)
- Maximum speed: 90 or 100 mph (145 or 161 km/h)
- Weight: 34 long tons (35 t; 38 short tons)
- HVAC: Steam, electric, or dual heating, ETH index (Mk1 3, Mk2 4)
- Bogies: Mark 1: BR1 or Commonwealth, Mark 2: B4
- Braking systems: Vacuum, air, or both
- Coupling system: Drop-head knuckle coupler on draw-hook (dual)
- Track gauge: 4 ft 8 1/2 in (1,435 mm) standard gauge

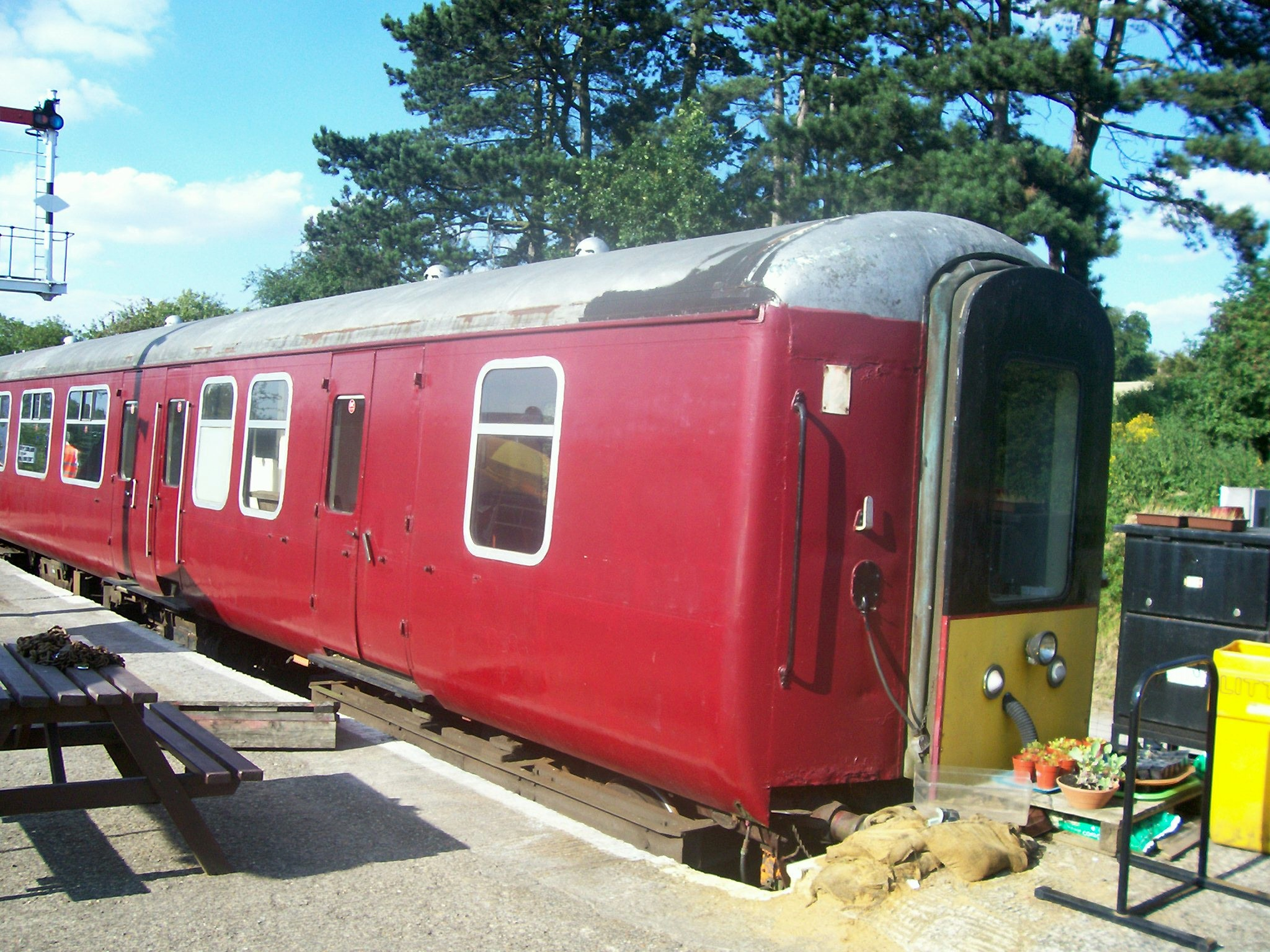
Mk 2 BSOT number 9102 at the Northampton & Lamport Railway. Converted for use by a Motorman in push-pull train operation.

A Brake Standard Open (Micro-Buffet), often abbreviated to BSOT or BSO(T), is a type of railway carriage used by British Rail.

These coaches were converted from a Brake Standard Open (BSO), by replacing one passenger seating bay with a counter for serving food, and space for a trolley for light refreshments. The toilet was removed and the space converted to a steward's prep-room and store.

Two batches of coaches were converted, as shown below.

Number range	Type
9000-9017	Mark 1
9100-9107	Mark 2

These coaches are no longer in scheduled main-line services, the last being withdrawn in the mid-1990s. However, several coaches from both Mk1 and Mk2 types have been preserved on heritage railways, or are used by charter companies. These are detailed below:

Numbers		Built	Location	Condition
BSOT	BSO	Built	Location	Condition
9000	9276	1956 Doncaster	Gloucestershire Warwickshire Railway	In service
9001	9275	1956 Doncaster	Paignton and Dartmouth Steam Railway	In service
9002	9372	1963 Wolverton		Scrapped
9003	9377	1963 Wolverton	Dean Forest Railway	In service
9004	9379	1963 Wolverton		Scrapped
9005	9373	1963 Wolverton		Scrapped
9006	9365	1963 Wolverton		Scrapped
9007	9374	1963 Wolverton		Scrapped
9008	9367	1963 Wolverton		Scrapped
9009	9378	1963 Wolverton		Scrapped
9010	9369	1963 Wolverton	Mid Norfolk Railway	In service
9011	9370	1963 Wolverton	Embsay and Bolton Abbey Steam Railway	In service
9012	9371	1963 Wolverton		Scrapped
9013	9368	1963 Wolverton		Scrapped
9014	9380	1963 Wolverton	West Somerset Railway	In service
9015	9229	1955 Doncaster	Swanage Railway	In service
9016	9237	1956 Doncaster	Bo'ness and Kinneil Railway	In service
9017	9375	1963 Wolverton		Scrapped
9100	9405	1966 Derby	Royal Deeside Railway	Static use as a visitor centre
9101	9398	1966 Derby	Vintage Trains	Mainline charter service
9102	9383	1966 Derby	Northampton & Lamport Railway	In service
9103	9389	1966 Derby	Nottingham Heritage Centre	In service
9104	9401	1966 Derby	West Coast Railways	Mainline charter service
9105	9404	1966 Derby	Peak Rail	In service
9106	9406	1966 Derby	Telford Steam Railway	Under Restoration
9107	9407	1966 Derby		Scrapped
