= Brake Standard Open =

British Rail Brake Standard Open
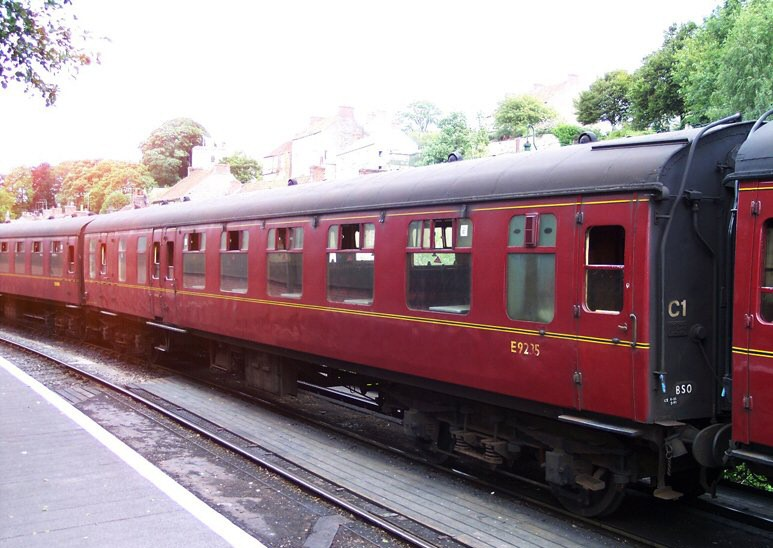
- In service: 1955–
- Manufacturers: Mark 1: BR Doncaster, Wolverton and Gloucester RCW; Mark 2: BR Derby
- Family name: British Railways Mark 1, British Rail Mark 2
- Constructed: Mark 1: 1955–1963; Mark 2: 1966–1974
- Number built: 340
- Fleet numbers: 9200–9539
- Capacity: Mark 1: 39; Mark 2/A–D: 31; Mark 2E/F: 32
- Operator: British Rail

Specifications
- Car length: 66 ft 0 in (20.12 m)
- Width: 9 ft 3 in (2.82 m)
- Height: 12 ft 9 1/2 in (3.90 m)
- Maximum speed: 90–100 mph (145–161 km/h)
- Weight: 33 long tons (34 t; 37 short tons)
- HVAC: Steam, Electric or both
- Bogies: BR1, Commonwealth, or B4
- Braking systems: Vacuum, Air, or both
- Coupling system: Drop-head knuckle coupler on draw-hook
- Track gauge: 4 ft 8 1/2 in (1,435 mm) standard gauge

A Brake Standard Open (BSO) is a type of railway carriage used by British Rail. Both Mark 1 and Mark 2 types were built. Each consists of a standard class open passenger saloon with a centre aisle, a guard's compartment with hand brake and a lockable luggage compartment.

A number of Mark 1 and Mark 2 BSOs were converted to Brake Standard Open (Micro-Buffet) (BSOT), and fourteen Mark 2 BSOs were converted to Driving Brake Standard Open (DBSO). A number of BSO and BSOT coaches have been preserved, and some are still in use on main line charters. One significant survivor is No. 9267, the last surviving coach in the final excursion train on the Somerset & Dorset line on 6 March 1966, which is appropriately located at Midsomer Norton.

== Orders ==
Lot No.	Diagram	Mark	Built	Builder	Qty	Fleet numbers	Notes
30170	183	1	1955–1956	Doncaster	77	9200–9276	BR1 bogies
30244	183	1	1956	Doncaster	45	9277–9321	BR1 bogies
30443	183	1	1959	Gloucester	41	9322–9362	BR1 bogies
30698	184	1	1963	Wolverton	18	9363–9380	Commonwealth bogies, fluorescent lighting
30757	185	2	1966	Derby	36	9381–9416	B4 bogies
30777	180	2A	1967	Derby	9	9417–9425	B4 bogies
30788	180	2A	1968	Derby	13	9426–9438	B4 bogies
30798	186	2C	1970	Derby	10	9439–9448	B4 bogies
30820	186	2C	1970	Derby	30	9449–9478	B4 bogies
30824	187	2D	1971	Derby	17	9479–9495	B4 bogies
30383	188	2E	1972	Derby	14	9496–9509	B4 bogies
30861	189	2F	1974	Derby	30	9510–9539	B4 bogies

== See also ==
- Open coach
