= British Rail Mark 2 =

British railway passenger carriages

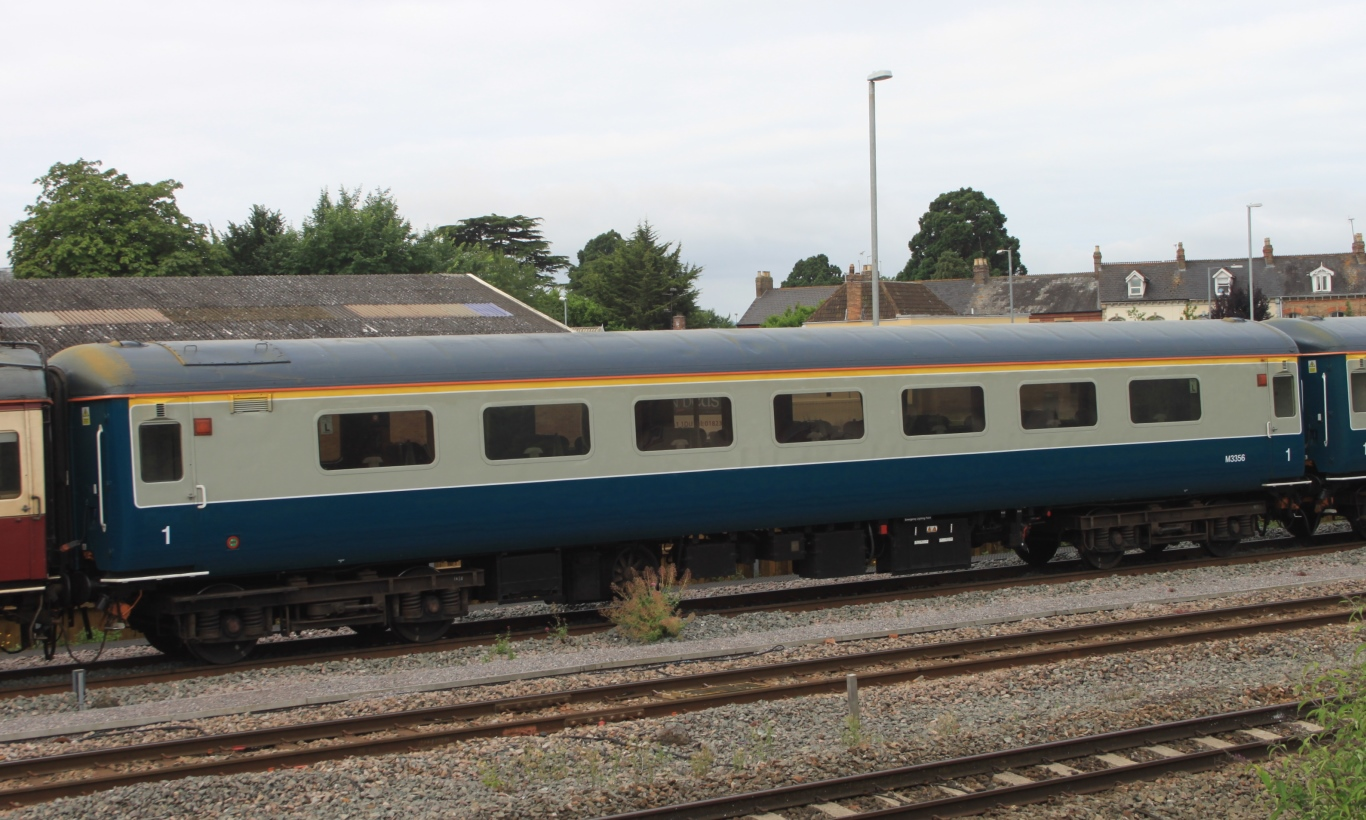
- Mark 2f First open in original British Rail livery

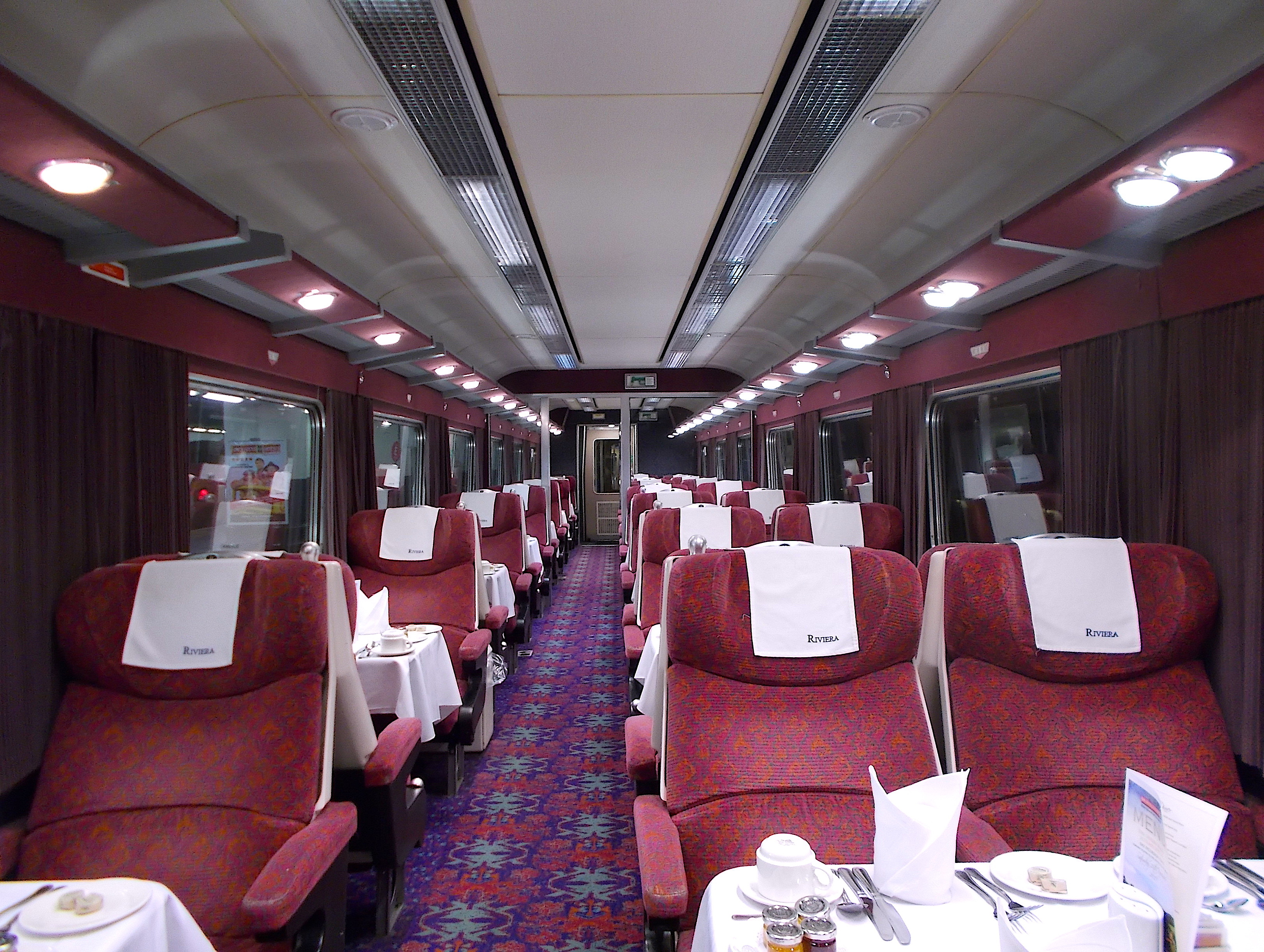
- The interior of a Mark 2 Open First showing the former Virgin Trains West Coast Burgundy seat moquette trim
- In service: 1964–present
- Manufacturer: British Rail Engineering Limited
- Built at: Prototype: Swindon Works, Production: Derby Litchurch Lane Works
- Constructed: 1963–1975
- Entered service: 1964
- Number built: 1,876
- Operators: DB Cargo UK; Direct Rail Services; Network Rail; Riviera Trains; West Coast Railways

Specifications
- Car body construction: Steel; Semi-integral
- Car length: 64 ft 6 in (19.66 m)
- Doors: Hinged slam, centrally locked
- Maximum speed: 100 mph (161 km/h)
- HVAC: Pressure Ventilation; Air Conditioning (1971 onward)
- Bogies: B4 or B5
- Braking systems: Mark 2 as built: Clasp, Vacuum operated; Mark 2a–2f as built: Clasp, Air operated
- Track gauge: 1,435 mm (4 ft 8 1/2 in) standard gauge; 1,600 mm (5 ft 3 in) (NIR IÉ); 1,067 mm (3 ft 6 in) NZ TR; 1,000 mm (3 ft 3 3/8 in) metre gauge (KRC)

The Mark 2 family of railway carriages are British Rail's second design of carriages. They were built by British Rail workshops (from 1969 British Rail Engineering Limited (BREL)) between 1964 and 1975 and were of steel construction.

== Development and production ==
The Mark 2 has a semi-integral construction, giving it more strength than a Mark 1 in the event of an accident. A key driver of the changed construction method was to overcome the serious corrosion problem point in the Mark 1 at the base of the body, where it was attached to the underframe. Other changes of design, such as the window units, were for the same reason, which had become a serious problem in Mark 1 vehicle maintenance costs. Revised painting methods were also part of this, which coincided with the change of livery from maroon (dark green on the Southern) to the blue and grey that Mark 2 coaches wore for much of their lives (some of the earliest Mark 2 coaches had the old livery at first). The prototype Mark 2, FK 13252, was built in 1963, and is now preserved by and located at the Mid-Norfolk Railway.

| Variant | Built | Type | Features | No. Built | Original Numbers |
|---|---|---|---|---|---|
| Mark 2 | 1964–66 | Pullman Kitchen First (PK) | The basic model, with pressure ventilation and wood panelling. Fitted with vacuum brakes, so they could run with Mark 1 stock. Dual heating (steam & electric). Later some were fitted with air-operated disc brakes for Edinburgh - Glasgow push-pull services with Class 27s, which replaced Inter-City Class 126 DMUs. | 8 | 500–507 |
| Mark 2 | 1964–66 | Pullman Parlour First (PC) | The basic model, with pressure ventilation and wood panelling. Fitted with vacuum brakes, so they could run with Mark 1 stock. Dual heating (steam & electric). Later some were fitted with air-operated disc brakes for Edinburgh - Glasgow push-pull services with Class 27s, which replaced Inter-City Class 126 DMUs. | 14 | 540–553 |
| Mark 2 | 1964–66 | Pullman Brake First (PB) | The basic model, with pressure ventilation and wood panelling. Fitted with vacuum brakes, so they could run with Mark 1 stock. Dual heating (steam & electric). Later some were fitted with air-operated disc brakes for Edinburgh - Glasgow push-pull services with Class 27s, which replaced Inter-City Class 126 DMUs. | 7 | 580–586 |
| Mark 2 | 1964–66 | Tourist Open Second (TSO) | The basic model, with pressure ventilation and wood panelling. Fitted with vacuum brakes, so they could run with Mark 1 stock. Dual heating (steam & electric). Later some were fitted with air-operated disc brakes for Edinburgh - Glasgow push-pull services with Class 27s, which replaced Inter-City Class 126 DMUs. | 59 | 5070–5228 |
| Mark 2 | 1964–66 | Open Second (SO) | The basic model, with pressure ventilation and wood panelling. Fitted with vacuum brakes, so they could run with Mark 1 stock. Dual heating (steam & electric). Later some were fitted with air-operated disc brakes for Edinburgh - Glasgow push-pull services with Class 27s, which replaced Inter-City Class 126 DMUs. | 28 | 5229–5256 |
| Mark 2 | 1964–66 | Open Brake Second (BSO) | The basic model, with pressure ventilation and wood panelling. Fitted with vacuum brakes, so they could run with Mark 1 stock. Dual heating (steam & electric). Later some were fitted with air-operated disc brakes for Edinburgh - Glasgow push-pull services with Class 27s, which replaced Inter-City Class 126 DMUs. | 36 | 9381–9416 |
| Mark 2 | 1964–66 | Corridor First (FK) | The basic model, with pressure ventilation and wood panelling. Fitted with vacuum brakes, so they could run with Mark 1 stock. Dual heating (steam & electric). Later some were fitted with air-operated disc brakes for Edinburgh - Glasgow push-pull services with Class 27s, which replaced Inter-City Class 126 DMUs. | 71 | 13252, 13361–13406, 13410–13433 |
| Mark 2 | 1964–66 | Corridor Brake First (BFK) | The basic model, with pressure ventilation and wood panelling. Fitted with vacuum brakes, so they could run with Mark 1 stock. Dual heating (steam & electric). Later some were fitted with air-operated disc brakes for Edinburgh - Glasgow push-pull services with Class 27s, which replaced Inter-City Class 126 DMUs. | 28 | 14028–14055 |
| Mark 2A | 1967–68 | Tourist Open Second (TSO) | Adoption of more features from the XP64 set. Air-braked so had to run in dedicated sets. Green folding plastic gangway doors and vestibule ends. | 177 | 5257–5433 |
| Mark 2A | 1967–68 | Open Brake Second (BSO) | Adoption of more features from the XP64 set. Air-braked so had to run in dedicated sets. Green folding plastic gangway doors and vestibule ends. | 22 | 9417–9438 |
| Mark 2A | 1967–68 | Corridor First (FK) | Adoption of more features from the XP64 set. Air-braked so had to run in dedicated sets. Green folding plastic gangway doors and vestibule ends. | 42 | 13434–13475 |
| Mark 2A | 1967–68 | Corridor Brake First (BFK) | Adoption of more features from the XP64 set. Air-braked so had to run in dedicated sets. Green folding plastic gangway doors and vestibule ends. | 48 | 14056–14103 |
| Mark 2B | 1969 | Tourist Open Second (TSO) | Centre door omitted and wide wrap-round doors at the ends. Space saved by removal of the centre vestibule used to move toilets to one at each end instead of two at one end, as previously. Red folding plastic gangway doors and vestibule ends. | 64 | 5434–5497 |
| Mark 2B | 1969 | Corridor First (FK) | Centre door omitted and wide wrap-round doors at the ends. Space saved by removal of the centre vestibule used to move toilets to one at each end instead of two at one end, as previously. Red folding plastic gangway doors and vestibule ends. | 38 | 13476–13513 |
| Mark 2B | 1969 | Corridor Brake First (BFK) | Centre door omitted and wide wrap-round doors at the ends. Space saved by removal of the centre vestibule used to move toilets to one at each end instead of two at one end, as previously. Red folding plastic gangway doors and vestibule ends. | 9 | 14104–14112 |
| Mark 2C | 1969–70 | Open First (FO) | As Mk2b, with lowered ceiling with provision for ducts for air conditioning (never fitted). Red folding plastic gangway doors and vestibule ends. | 18 | 3152–3169 |
| Mark 2C | 1969–70 | Tourist Open Second (TSO) | As Mk2b, with lowered ceiling with provision for ducts for air conditioning (never fitted). Red folding plastic gangway doors and vestibule ends. | 118 | 5498–5615 |
| Mark 2C | 1969–70 | Open Brake Second (BSO) | As Mk2b, with lowered ceiling with provision for ducts for air conditioning (never fitted). Red folding plastic gangway doors and vestibule ends. | 40 | 9439–9478 |
| Mark 2C | 1969–70 | Corridor First (FK) | As Mk2b, with lowered ceiling with provision for ducts for air conditioning (never fitted). Red folding plastic gangway doors and vestibule ends. | 48 | 13514–13561 |
| Mark 2C | 1969–70 | Corridor Brake First (BFK) | As Mk2b, with lowered ceiling with provision for ducts for air conditioning (never fitted). Red folding plastic gangway doors and vestibule ends. | 26 | 14113–14138 |
| Mark 2D | 1971–72 | Open First (FO) | Combined pressure ventilation/air-conditioning fitted so no opening windows in the seating area, glass area reduced, windows tinted. Electric heating only from here onward. Mk2d FKs and BFKs were the last locomotive-hauled side-corridor compartment coaches constructed for British Railways, other than sleeping cars. Red folding plastic gangway doors and vestibule ends. | 47 | 3170–3216 |
| Mark 2D | 1971–72 | Tourist Open Second (TSO) | Combined pressure ventilation/air-conditioning fitted so no opening windows in the seating area, glass area reduced, windows tinted. Electric heating only from here onward. Mk2d FKs and BFKs were the last locomotive-hauled side-corridor compartment coaches constructed for British Railways, other than sleeping cars. Red folding plastic gangway doors and vestibule ends. | 128 | 5616–5743 |
| Mark 2D | 1971–72 | Open Brake Second (BSO) | Combined pressure ventilation/air-conditioning fitted so no opening windows in the seating area, glass area reduced, windows tinted. Electric heating only from here onward. Mk2d FKs and BFKs were the last locomotive-hauled side-corridor compartment coaches constructed for British Railways, other than sleeping cars. Red folding plastic gangway doors and vestibule ends. | 17 | 9479–9495 |
| Mark 2D | 1971–72 | Corridor First (FK) | Combined pressure ventilation/air-conditioning fitted so no opening windows in the seating area, glass area reduced, windows tinted. Electric heating only from here onward. Mk2d FKs and BFKs were the last locomotive-hauled side-corridor compartment coaches constructed for British Railways, other than sleeping cars. Red folding plastic gangway doors and vestibule ends. | 49 | 13562–13610 |
| Mark 2D | 1971–72 | Corridor Brake First (BFK) | Combined pressure ventilation/air-conditioning fitted so no opening windows in the seating area, glass area reduced, windows tinted. Electric heating only from here onward. Mk2d FKs and BFKs were the last locomotive-hauled side-corridor compartment coaches constructed for British Railways, other than sleeping cars. Red folding plastic gangway doors and vestibule ends. | 34 | 14139–14172 |
| Mark 2E | 1972–74 | Open First (FO) | Luggage racks fitted opposite toilet cubicles, which were reduced in size. Cream folding plastic gangway doors and vestibule ends. | 55 | 3221–3275 |
| Mark 2E | 1972–74 | Tourist Open Second (TSO) | Luggage racks fitted opposite toilet cubicles, which were reduced in size. Cream folding plastic gangway doors and vestibule ends. | 160 | 5744–5804, 5809–5907 |
| Mark 2E | 1972–74 | Open Brake Second (BSO) | Luggage racks fitted opposite toilet cubicles, which were reduced in size. Cream folding plastic gangway doors and vestibule ends. | 14 | 9496–9509 |
| Mark 2F | 1973–75 | Open First (FO) | Interior panelling made of plastic, new-style seating (IC70 seats) in most but not all coaches - some TSO had same seats as earlier Mk2s, full air-conditioning with lower bodyside heaters. These features had debuted on the Mark 3 prototypes. Cream folding plastic gangway doors and vestibule ends. | 164 | 3276–3439 |
| Mark 2F | 1973–75 | Tourist Open Second (TSO) | Interior panelling made of plastic, new-style seating (IC70 seats) in most but not all coaches - some TSO had same seats as earlier Mk2s, full air-conditioning with lower bodyside heaters. These features had debuted on the Mark 3 prototypes. Cream folding plastic gangway doors and vestibule ends. | 277 | 5908–6184 |
| Mark 2F | 1973–75 | Open Brake Second (BSO) | Interior panelling made of plastic, new-style seating (IC70 seats) in most but not all coaches - some TSO had same seats as earlier Mk2s, full air-conditioning with lower bodyside heaters. These features had debuted on the Mark 3 prototypes. Cream folding plastic gangway doors and vestibule ends. | 30 | 9510–9539 |

The final Mark 2 carriage was departmental 999550, in 1977. As of 21 November 2020 it is still in service with Network Rail as a Track Recording Coach. The later versions (2D onwards) look somewhat similar to the later Mark 3 design. The Mark 3 is longer (75 feet as opposed to 64 feet 6 inches), has a large skirting between the bogies to conceal the ancillary equipment, and has a ridged roof as opposed to the smooth roof of the Mark 2. The development of the High Speed Train overlapped with that of the final production run, and the Mark 2F "previewed" many features incorporated into the Mark 3, such as new seating, plastic interior panelling, and floor-sensor-operated automatic gangway doors.

Unlike Mark 1 coaches, built by a wide range of manufacturers, both BR workshops and private builders, all production Mark 2 (and Mark 3) coaches were built on a single assembly line at the BR carriage works at Derby.

=== Multiple units based on the Mark 2 ===
Unlike the many Mark 1 multiple units and the numerous Mark 3 multiple units that followed, few multiple unit classes were based on the Mark 2 bodyshell. Most were electric multiple units with British Railways, and which operated under AC using overhead wires. The first of these were Class AM10 in 1966 operating commuter services from London Euston and in the West Midlands. The introduction of TOPS saw these units reclassified Class 310. The other type was Class 312, a derivative of, and almost identical to, the Class 310, introduced in 1975, primarily used on commuter services from London King's Cross and London Liverpool Street, the last slam-door multiple units built for British Railways. Northern Ireland Railways used the Mark 2 bodyshell as the basis for the 80 Class DEMU, which entered service in 1974. Thirteen 5 car electric multiple units were built in 1976 for Taiwan (and withdrawn in 2009): the Taiwan Railway EMU100 series.

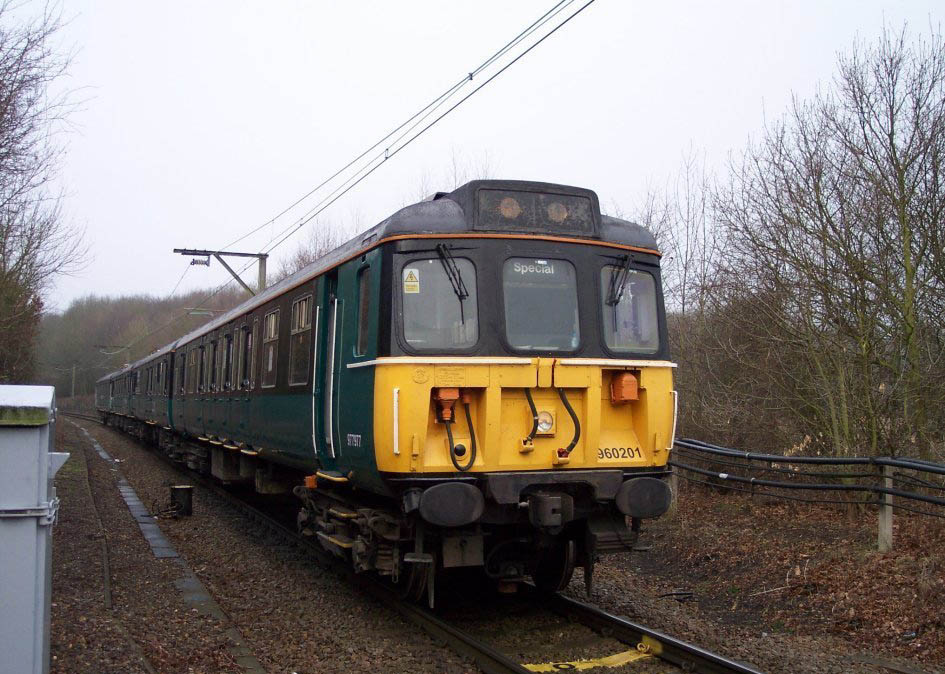
Class 310

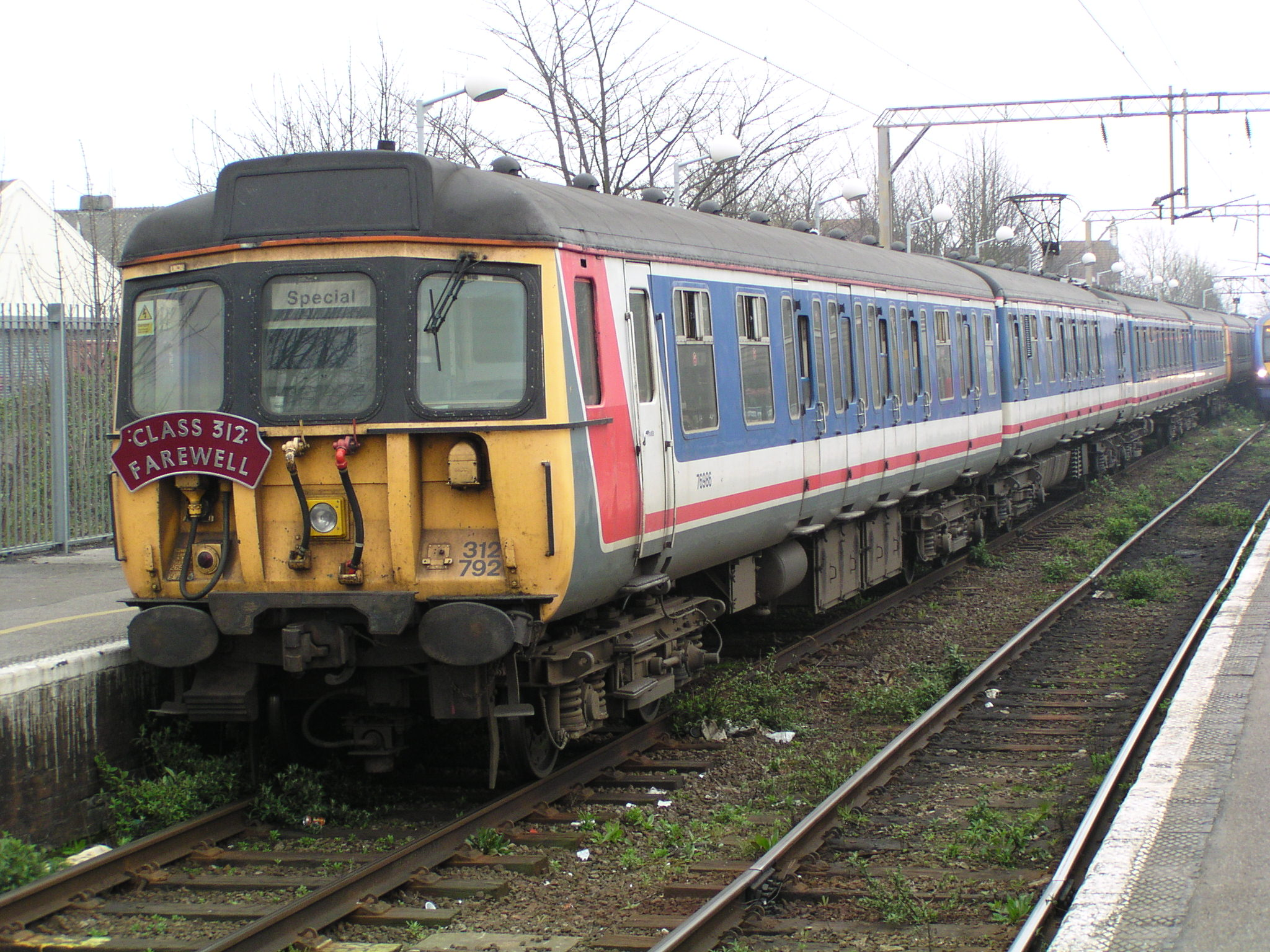
Class 312

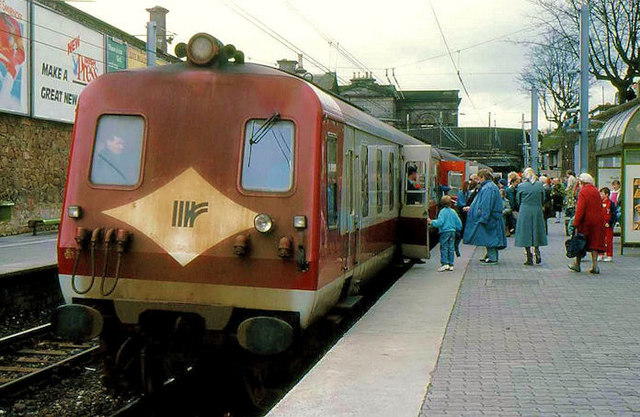
80 Class

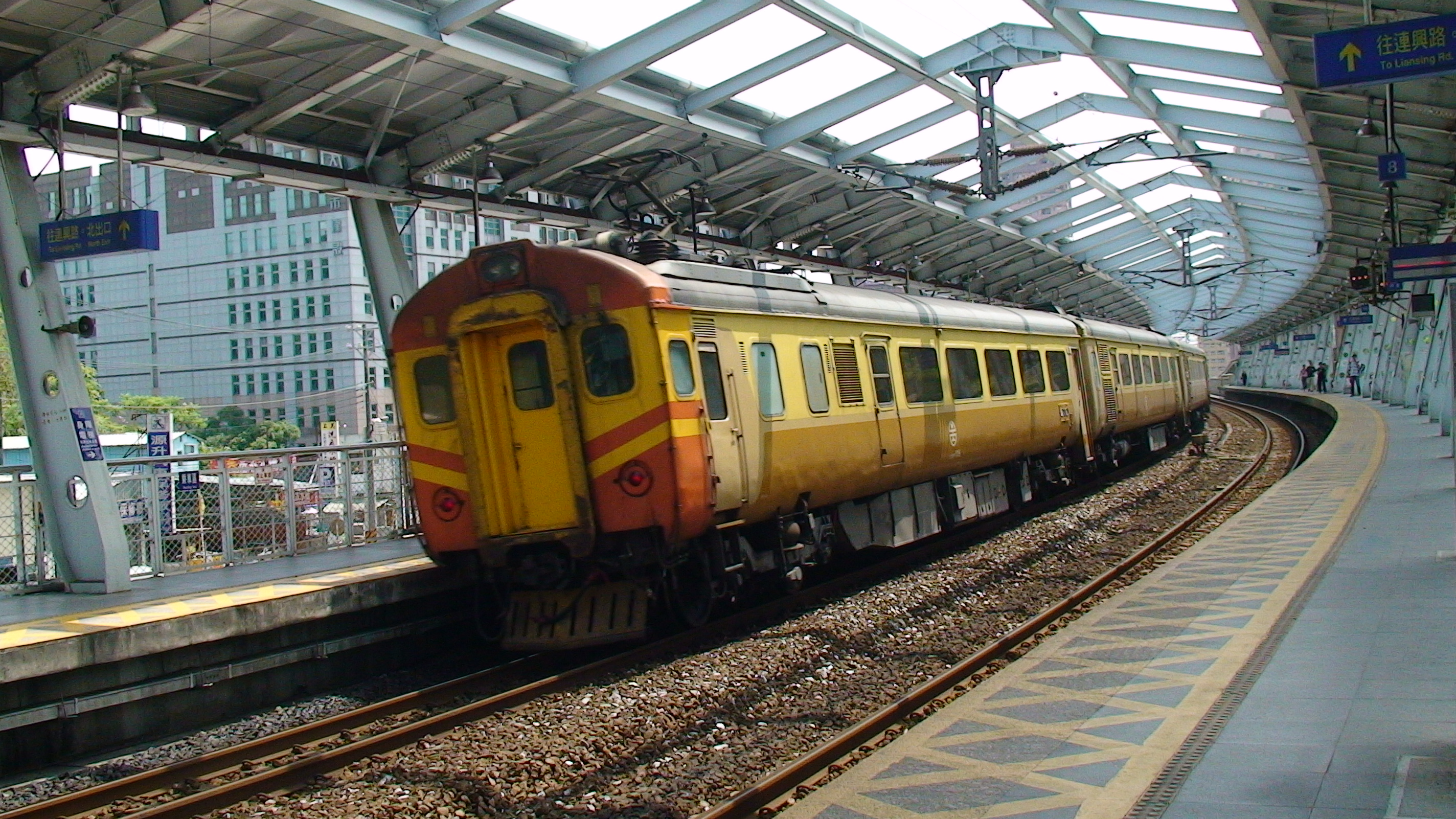
Taiwanese EMU100

== Service ==
=== United Kingdom ===
The Mark 2 coach was one of the mainstays of the InterCity network, but new rolling stock introduced in the post-privatisation era has resulted in most being withdrawn.

No catering vehicles were built to Mark 2 design, so all Mark 2 Inter City trains offering catering facilities (including the later air conditioned stock) continued to include Mark 1 restaurant or buffet cars.

Since their withdrawal from most main line duties, Mark 2 coaches have played an increasing role on private rail tours, charter trains, and on heritage railways. Since 1996, over 140 Mark 2 carriages have been exported to New Zealand, where they are still in mainline service (as of 2020).

==== Manchester Pullman ====
Mark 2 carriages were used on the Manchester Pullman service from 1966 until withdrawal in 1985. These luxuriously appointed first class carriages had several unusual features, such as inward opening doors and some interior walnut panelling. Only 29 carriages were built. The livery was pearl grey with blue window surrounds, a reversal of the standard British Rail blue and grey livery of the late 1960s and 1970s. A Liverpool Pullman service was also operated, using the same type of carriages, until 1974.

==== Current ====
As of May 2020, Mark 2 coaches are still in use on some services on the UK rail network.

- Network Rail operate Mark 2s as brake force carriages on its test trains.
- Riviera Trains and West Coast Railways both operate Mark 2s on charters; many of the former's are still painted in Anglia Railways and Virgin Trains liveries.

=== Northern Ireland ===
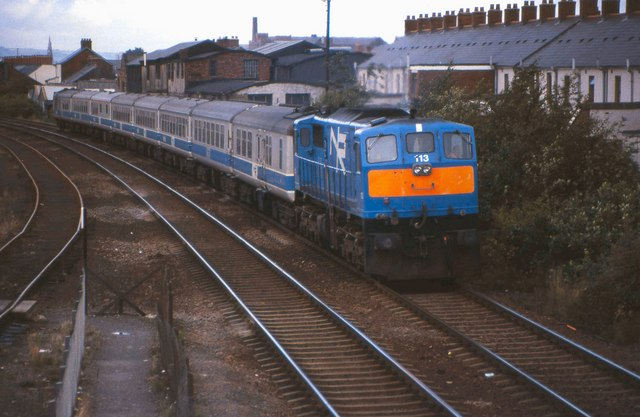
Mark 2Bs hauled by a NIR Class 111 at Adelaide in 1988

In 1970, NIR purchased new Mark 2Bs for the Enterprise train service between Belfast and Dublin. These were initially painted in an attractive maroon and blue livery and worked by maroon BREL-built Hunslet Bo-Bos of the NIR 101 Class. A pale grey livery with a blue stripe below the windows was introduced in the 1980s. This rake included No. 547, the only Mark 2B dining car. This carriage was restored in 2008 by the Railway Preservation Society of Ireland (RPSI). The Mark 2B carriages were replaced on the Enterprise service by new carriages built in France by De Dietrich Ferroviaire in 1996.

NIR purchased eight British Rail Class 488 electric multiple unit coaches in 2001 that been converted from Mark 2F coaches for the Gatwick Express service from London Victoria to Gatwick Airport. They were renumbered 8941-8948, The worked with NIR Generator Van 8911. They were withdrawn on 19 January 2005, having been replaced by new C3K units. They were reintroduced in September 2006 to provide extra capacity on the Portadown to Belfast (Central) service, making one trip every morning, hauled by a Class 111 locomotive. An ex-Anglia MkIIf DBSO, No. 9712 (renumbered by NIR as 8918), was bought that year to work with the Gatwick stock, but overhaul and regauging took so long that by the time it arrived in Northern Ireland in 2009, the Gatwicks had been withdrawn. Their final passenger run was on 18 June 2009.

The RPSI also acquired some Mark 2s for use in its steam hauled train in Northern Ireland in the early 2000s. These are normally based at the RPSI's Whitehead depot, as well as being steam hauled they are also occasionally hired out for diesel hauled railtours. They also have some ex-NIR and ex-CIE Mark 2 stock, some of which formerly operated on the Dublin to Belfast Enterprise service.

The RPSI bought the eight withdrawn Gatwick Express Mark 2 coaches and generator van from NIR, which are currently (2017) in store at Dundalk and Whitehead. They will be used to augment and to replace some of the RPSI's current Mark 2 fleet that work out of Whitehead. The DBSO entered preservation at the Downpatrick and County Down Railway on 27 September 2014, having never carried a passenger in NIR service or having left York Road depot by rail.

=== Republic of Ireland ===
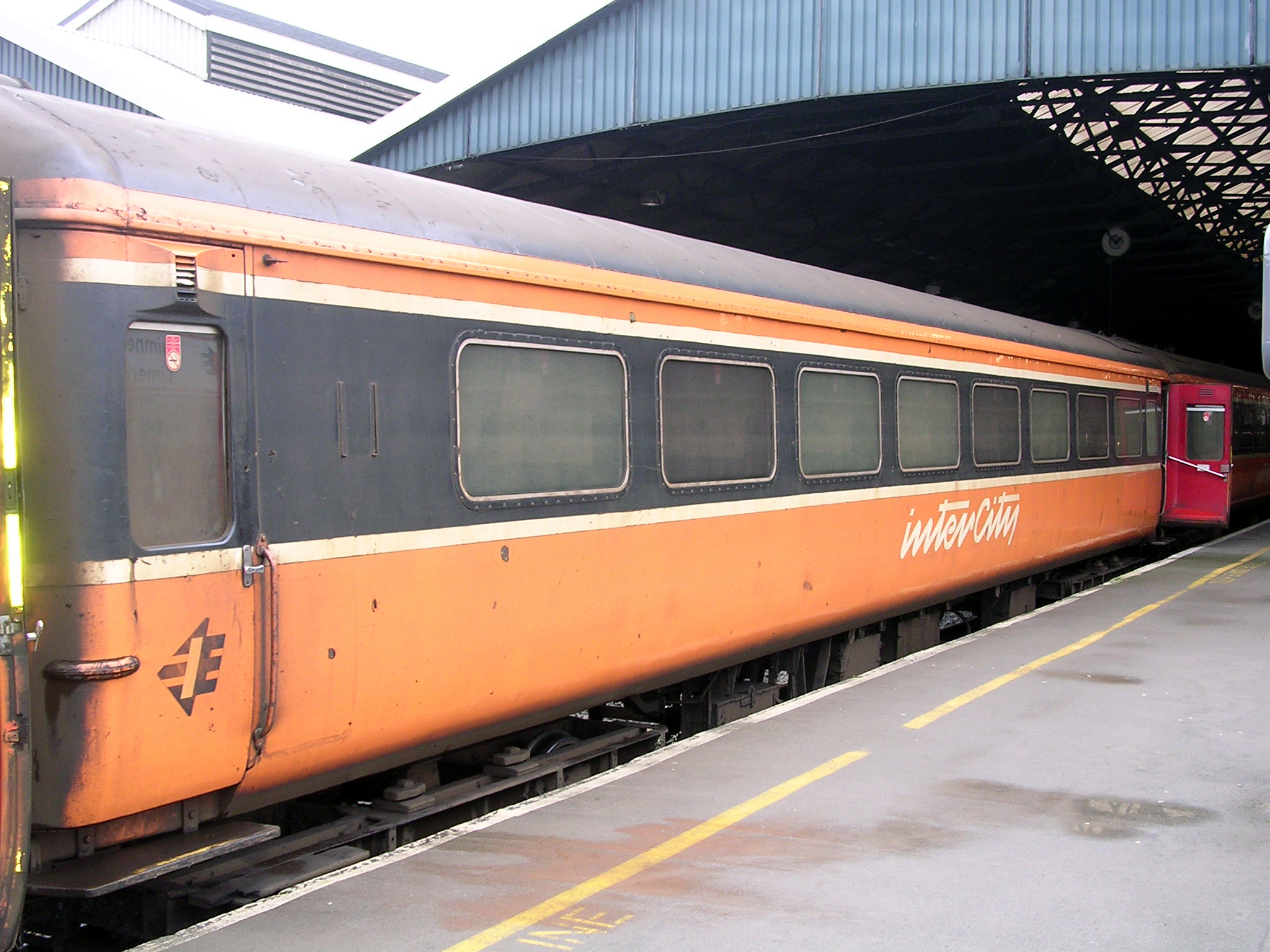
An Iarnród Éireann Mark 2D at Limerick Colbert Station in 2006

In 1972, CIÉ placed an order with BREL for 72 coaches based on the Mark 2D. With air conditioning as a principal feature they became known as "AC Stock" and ran on type B4 bogies, with vacuum brakes. The order consisted of six First Class coaches (5101–5106), nine Composites (5151–5159), 36 Standard Class (5201–5236), eleven Restaurant/Buffet Standard Class (5401–5411) and eleven Generator Vans (5601–5611). Internal fit-out was done in Inchicore, and was quite different from the original BR design, using bench seating rather than individual seats and with extensive use of wood veneer panelling.

Their electrical system differed from the BR and NIR versions. The generator van contained two engine/generator sets, each supplying 220/380 V 50 Hz AC to two separate electrical buses in the train. The air conditioning loads were divided in half, each half fed from a separate bus. In the case of failure of one generator set, the other set automatically supplies both buses. Air conditioning output power would then be halved, but all other loads including cooking, lighting and battery charging would continue to be supplied. This later remained the model for the electrical power supply on all subsequent IE coaches.

To accommodate changes in traffic, five of the Composites (5153–5156, 5158) were re-classed as Standards, and Restaurant/Buffet Standard 5408 was converted for use as the Presidential Coach.

Iarnród Éireann purchased fifteen carriages from a UK scrap dealer during 1989, in exchange for a similar number of scrap diesel locomotives. Older Mark 2A/B/C carriages were scrapped in 2004, as they were heavily corroded. A few were preserved (minus bogies) at certain heritage railways in Ireland.

The remaining Mark 2 carriages (the 1972 vintage Mark 2D sets) were phased out during 2007 and 2008, with the last set operating its final service, the 0505 Athlone–Heuston, on 31 March 2008. Two of these coaches, 5106 and 5203, were preserved by the Railway Preservation Society of Ireland. The Presidential Coach, 5408, has also been preserved by the RPSI.

=== New Zealand ===
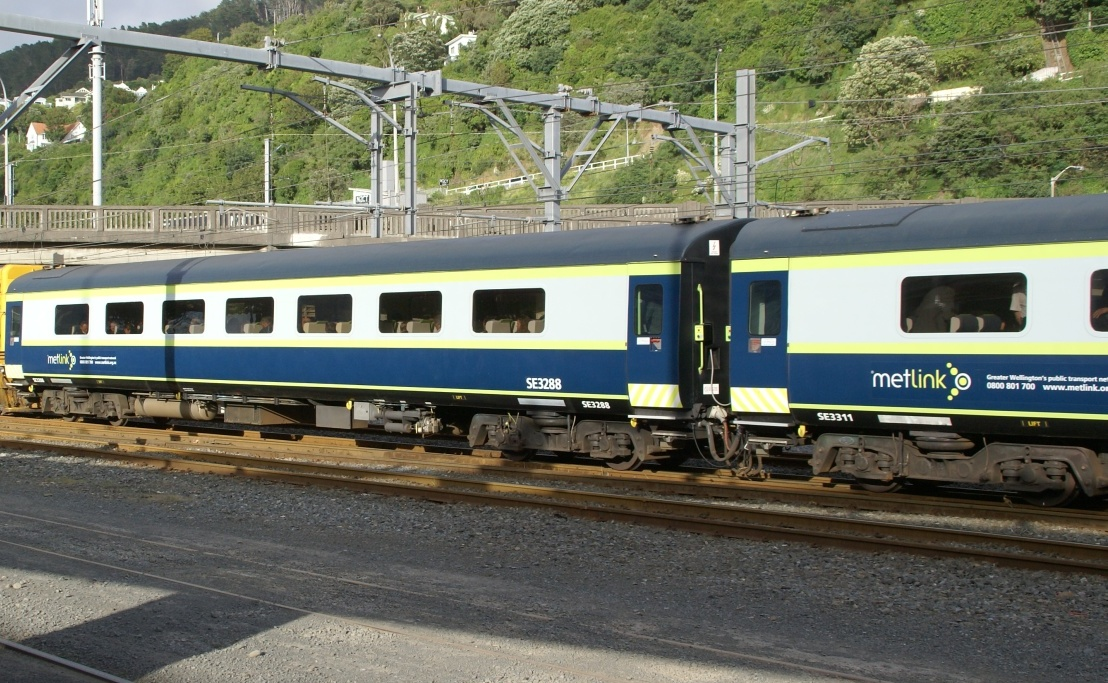
Refurbished Mark 2 carriages used on a Metlink Wairarapa Connection service in Wellington, 2014

150 refurbished former Mark 2D, 2E, and 2F First Open and Tourist Standard Open carriages are operated on New Zealand railway lines. The first 16 were exported in January 1997. Although New Zealand railway lines have a narrower track gauge of 1,067 mm (3 ft 6 in), the country has a similar loading gauge, allowing regauged BR carriages to run on most lines. The first carriages were imported in August 1996 by then rail operator Tranz Rail and heritage operator Mainline Steam. The first seven refurbished carriages entered regular service on 15 November 1999, on the Capital Connection service between Palmerston North and Wellington.

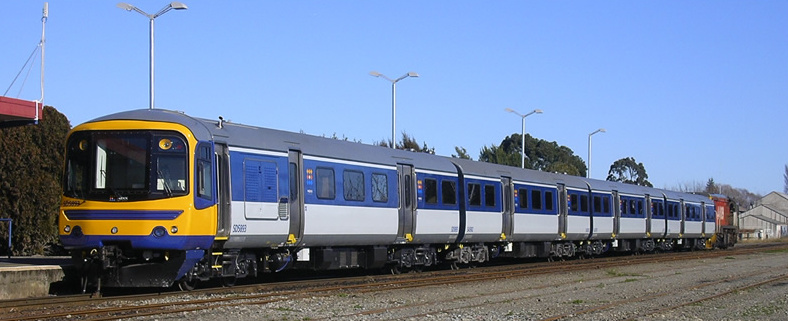
A British Rail Mark 2 carriage (New Zealand SD class) converted to a driving carriage for push-pull commuter trains in Auckland.

Until 2015, the former British Rail carriages ran virtually all carriage regional commuter services. Most of them (104) operated in Auckland, classified SA (81) and SD (23), in push-pull commuter trains, with three to five SA carriages, an SD driving carriage (similar to the original Mark 2 DBSOs), and a DC class (four- and five-car) or DFT class (six-car) diesel-electric locomotive. Auckland has since replaced its entire suburban fleet with the purpose-built New Zealand AM class electric multiple unit. Other BR Mark 2 carriages operate on the Capital Connection (8× S class), and the Wairarapa Connection between Masterton and Wellington (18× SW class). There are also six SE class carriages, which were used with electric locomotives on Wellington commuter services between 2008 and 2011 as a temporary measure until new EMUs were delivered. The carriages were reassigned to the Wairarapa Connection in June 2013, where peak service patronage was starting to exceed the capacity of the SW carriage fleet. Mainline Steam also own four refurbished carriages, classified ML, which are based in Plimmerton (north of Wellington) and are used for its steam-hauled excursions.

All New Zealand Mark 2 passenger carriages retained their original B.R. running numbers.

=== Taiwan ===
Following a decision to electrify Taiwan's busy West Coast Main Line, thirteen 5-car electric multiple units based on the Mark 2 design were built by BREL in York for the Taiwan Railway Administration in 1976, but following problems with the electrical equipment and excessive weight could not enter service until 1979 following the completion of remedial works. They used GEC electrical equipment and were built for 1,067 mm (3 ft 6 in) track gauge. They were used on the Tze-Chiang Limited Express service. They were withdrawn from service in 2009.

=== Kenya ===
Carriages based on the Mark 2 design were built by BREL for the Kenya Railways Corporation in the late 1970s.

== Models ==
=== OO gauge ===
Over the years, the British Railways Mark 2 design has been manufactured by many of the British model railway manufacturers.

Hornby Railways introduced Mk. 2 BFK and TSO models in the late 1960s and these have remained in production intermittently ever since, sometimes being used to represent coaches of later variants (such as the Mk.2 B BFK in the Royal Train). Hornby announced in 2013 that it would produce the Mk2E variant for its 2014 range. These are re-tooled versions and will be available in both their main range and their RailRoad range. Some from the main range will have interior lighting. Hornby are making three versions of the Mk2E i.e. FO, TSO and BSO.

Airfix introduced Mk. 2D BSO, FO and TSO models in the late 1970s, these later being produced by its successors Mainline, Dapol and ultimately Hornby. The Airfix Mk. 2D was a high quality model for its day, being more accurately detailed than most contemporary products, and it is still being produced by Hornby.

Lima produced Mk. 2B BFK, FK and TSO and Mk. 2E FO and TSO models. These were approximately 1 cm under scale length, and have not been produced since Lima was taken over by Hornby.

Bachmann Branchline introduced Mk. 2 and Mk. 2A BFK, BSO, FK and TSO models in the early 2000s, which were more detailed than the various older models. Bachmann have also announced new Mk. 2F BSO, DBSO, FO, RFB and TSO models for production in 2013–14.

A range of Mk. 2Bs covering both the BR and NIR variants was announced by Irish Railway Models and its British-outline arm Accurascale in late 2021. These will cover all variants. The BR versions under the Accurascale brand will be available individually, whilst the NIR versions under the Irish Railway Models brand will be available in 3-car packs.

=== N gauge ===
Graham Farish produce Mk.2F BSO, FO, RFB and TSO models and have announced upgraded models including a DBSO for 2013–14. Mk.2A BSO, FK and TSO models were announced in 2012–13.
