= List of landmarks and buildings of Brighton and Hove =

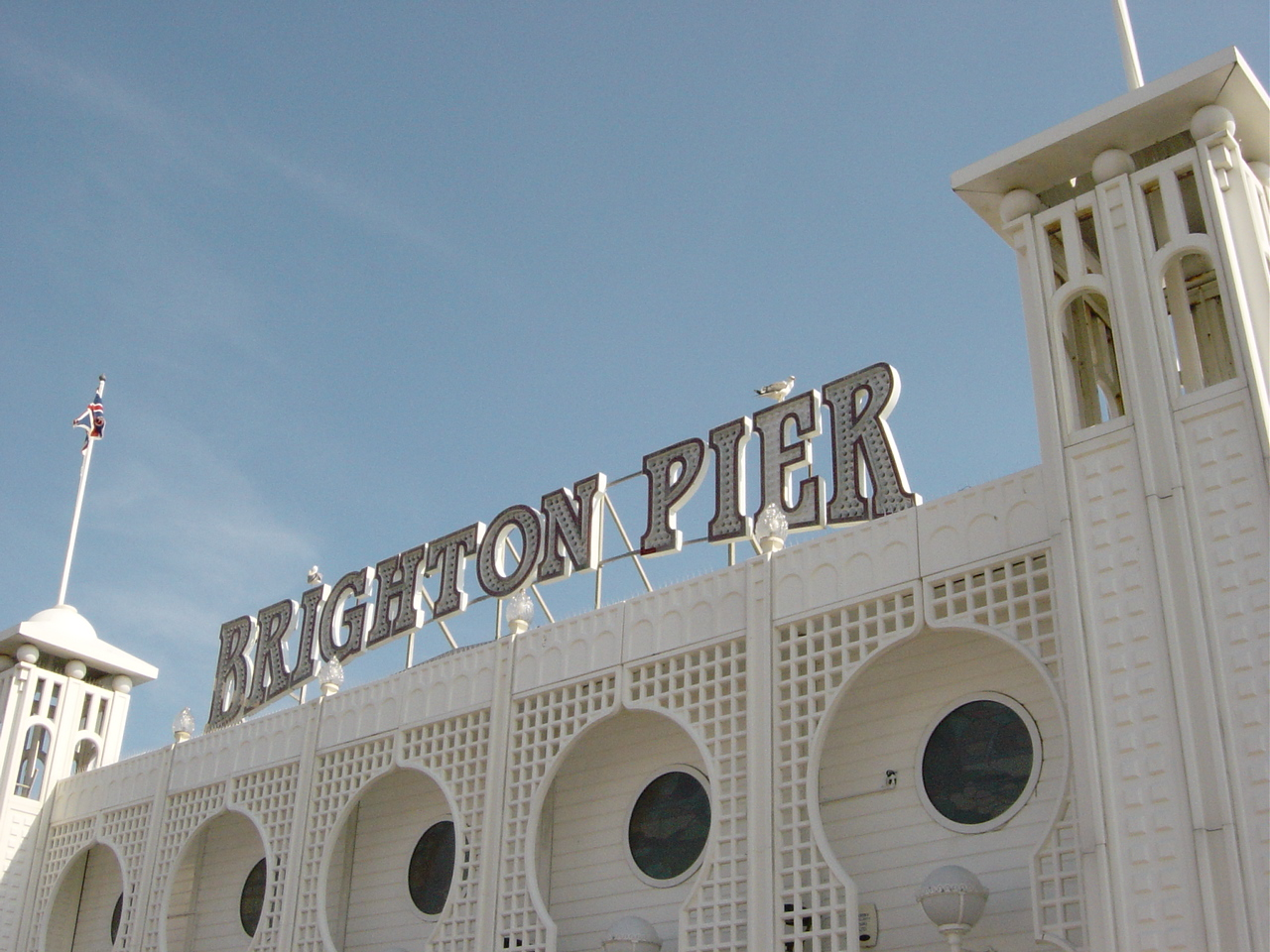
The Brighton Marine Palace and Pier

The city of Brighton and Hove (made up of the towns of Brighton and Hove) on the south coast of England, UK has a number notable buildings and landmarks.

== Extant ==
=== Buildings and structures ===
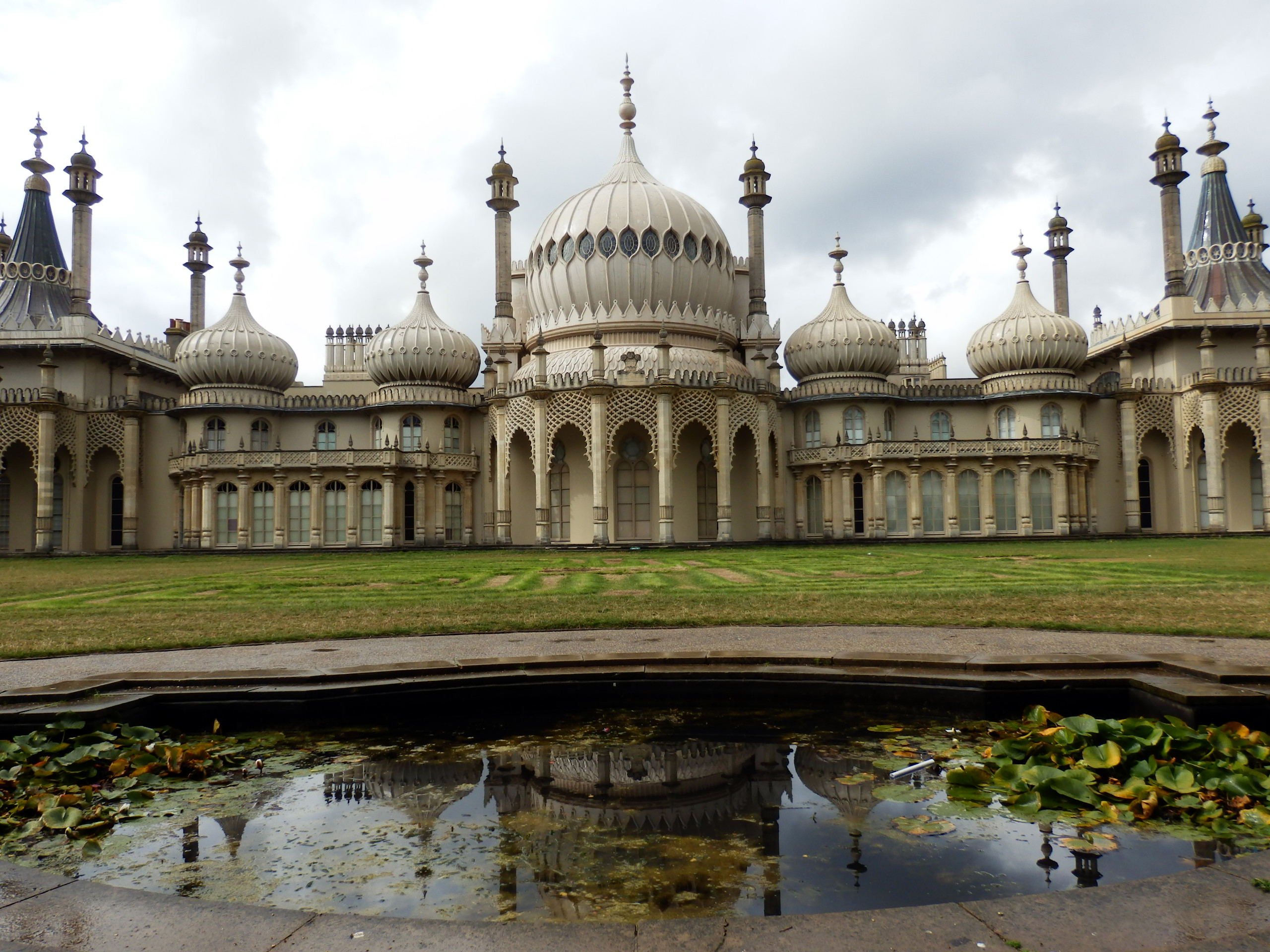
The Royal Pavilion

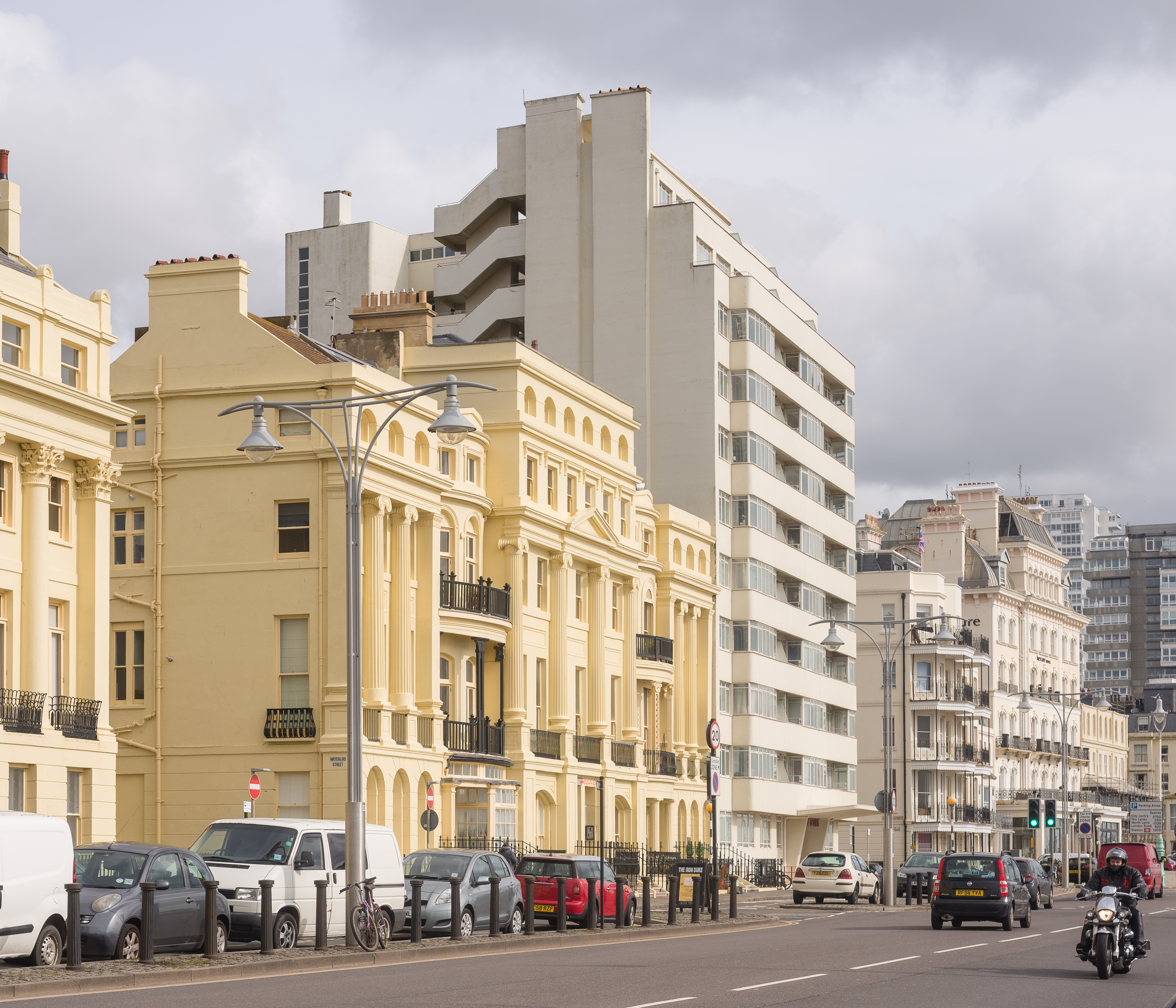
Brunswick estate and Embassy Court.

- Bedford Hotel, the present building being a replacement for one of Brighton's oldest and grandest hotels
- Brighton Centre, a concert venue and conference centre known for hosting conferences for many of the major political parties of the UK
- Brighton Marina
- Brighton Pier (also known as Palace Pier, and as Brighton Marine Palace and Pier)
- Brighton railway station
- The British Engineerium
- The Brunswick estate, Hove (a Regency housing development)
- Churchill Square, the largest shopping centre in Brighton
- The Clock Tower, a prominent landmark between Brighton Station and the seafront
- The County Ground, home of Sussex County Cricket Club
- Duke of York's Picture House, the oldest continuously operating cinema in Britain
- Embassy Court, a starkly modernist 1930s design adjacent to Regency Brunswick Terrace; was a prototype for a proposed redevelopment of the entire seafront. Was refurbished in the mid-2000s.
- Falmer Stadium, the home of Brighton and Hove Albion Football Club
- The Grand Hotel
- Hove railway station
- The British Airways i360, the tallest structure in the city at 162 m.
- Kemp Town (a Regency housing development)
- The Lanes, an area of Brighton known for its small, twisting series of pedestrianised streets housing many independent shops
- Marine Gate, a 1930s apartment block in the International/Modern style on the eastern approach to Brighton.
- The Metropole Hotel
- The New England Quarter
- North Laine, sometimes incorrectly referred to as "North Laines", North Laine is a group of streets known for their many independent and bohemian shops
- The Pylons, a pair of three-sided stone pillars either side of the southbound A23 road marking the boundary point of Brighton, and carrying a message of welcome for visitors
- The Regency Town House
- The Royal Pavilion
- Sassoon Mausoleum
- Stanmer House
- The University of Sussex, a radical 1960s campus design by Sir Basil Spence, some of which is listed
- The West Pier
- The Western Pavilion, self-made home of prolific local architect Amon Henry Wilds, son of Amon Wilds and sometime working partner of Charles Busby
- Withdean Stadium

=== Churches and places of worship ===
This is a small list of the most notable. See also List of places of worship in Brighton and Hove.

- All Saints Church, Hove
- St Bartholomew's Church, Brighton
- St Nicholas Church, Brighton
- St Paul's Church, Brighton
- St Peter's Church, Brighton

=== Murals ===
- Brighton Belle street mural, a view of the Brighton Belle train in Brighton Station, painted in the arches of the station's forecourt.
- Kissing Coppers, a mural by the artist Banksy on the side of The Prince Albert in Trafalgar Street.

=== Parks and other open air attractions ===
- Hove Park
- Preston Park
- Queen's Park
- St. Ann's Well Gardens
- Stanmer Park
- Volk's Electric Railway

== Extinct ==
- Brighton and Rottingdean Seashore Electric Railway ("Daddy Long Legs")
- The Royal Suspension Chain Pier

== See also ==
- Buildings and architecture of Brighton and Hove
- List of places of worship in Brighton and Hove (which includes some of those insufficiently notable to have been included in this list).
- Brighton and Hove, constituent towns of the city.
- Brighton Flint Grotto
