= Children of Men =

2006 film by Alfonso Cuarón

- Theatrical release poster
- Directed by: Alfonso Cuarón
- Screenplay by: Alfonso Cuarón; Timothy J. Sexton; David Arata; Mark Fergus Hawk Ostby
- Based on: The Children of Men by P. D. James
- Produced by: Iain Smith; Tony Smith; Marc Abraham; Eric Newman; Thomas A. Bliss; Hilary Shor
- Starring: Clive Owen; Julianne Moore; Michael Caine; Chiwetel Ejiofor; Charlie Hunnam
- Cinematography: Emmanuel Lubezki
- Edited by: Álex Rodríguez; Alfonso Cuarón
- Music by: John Tavener
- Production companies: Strike Entertainment; Hit and Run Productions; Toho-Towa
- Distributed by: Universal Pictures (United States and United Kingdom); Toho-Towa (Japan)
- Release dates: 3 September 2006 (Venice); 22 September 2006 (United Kingdom); 18 November 2006 (Japan); 25 December 2006 (United States)
- Running time: 109 minutes
- Countries: United Kingdom; United States; Japan
- Language: English
- Budget: $76 million
- Box office: $70.5 million

Children of Men is a 2006 dystopian action thriller film directed and co-written by Alfonso Cuarón. The screenplay, based on P. D. James' 1992 novel The Children of Men, was credited to five writers, with Clive Owen making additional, uncredited contributions. The film is set in 2027, when two decades of human infertility have left human civilisation on the brink of collapse. Asylum seekers seek sanctuary in the United Kingdom, where they are subjected to detention, deportation and execution by the government. Owen plays civil servant Theo Faron, who tries to help refugee Kee (Clare-Hope Ashitey) escape the chaos. Children of Men also stars Julianne Moore, Chiwetel Ejiofor, Pam Ferris, Charlie Hunnam, and Sir Michael Caine.

The film was released by Universal Pictures on 22 September 2006, in the UK and on 25 December in the US. Despite a limited marketing campaign during awards season by the film's distributor, Children of Men received critical acclaim and was recognized for its achievements in screenwriting, cinematography, art direction, and innovative single-shot action sequences. While it underperformed at the box office, it was nominated for three Academy Awards: Best Adapted Screenplay, Best Cinematography, and Best Film Editing. It was also nominated for three BAFTA Awards, winning Best Cinematography and Best Production Design, and for three Saturn Awards, winning Best Science Fiction Film.

The film has received enduring acclaim and has been frequently cited as one of the best dystopian films and often lauded as one of the greatest films of the 2000s, and of the 21st century. It was voted 13th in a BBC critics' poll on the best films released between 2000 and 2016 by film critics from around the world.

== Plot ==
In 2027, total human infertility has led to wars and global depression, pushing civilization to the brink of collapse as humanity faces extinction. The UK has transformed into a totalitarian police state in which asylum seekers are arrested and put in camps. Daily life is full of bombings, rationing, decay and propaganda. The populace mourns as they hear the news that the youngest person alive in the world is killed at age eighteen.

Theo Faron, a former activist turned cynical, depressed bureaucrat, is kidnapped by the Fishes, a militant refugee rights group led by Theo's estranged wife, Julian Taylor. The pair separated after their son's death in 2008. Julian offers Theo money to acquire transit papers from his cousin, the Minister of Arts, for a young refugee woman named Kee. Theo visits his cousin inside an elite mini-city within London where the powerful enjoy all the pleasures of the past. Theo obtains joint transit papers from his cousin, then tells Julian that he is willing to escort Kee himself in exchange for more money. Luke, a Fishes member, drives Theo, Kee, Julian, and Miriam (Kee's associate) towards Canterbury, but they are ambushed and Julian is killed. After the rest escape, Luke kills two police officers that stop them.

At a farm safe house, Kee reveals to Theo that she is pregnant, making her the only known pregnant woman in the world. Julian intended to take her to the Human Project, a secret scientific research group in the Azores dedicated to curing humanity's infertility. That night, Theo eavesdrops and learns that Luke and other Fishes orchestrated Julian's death, while also intending to kill Theo and use Kee's baby as their political tool. Theo orchestrates an escape for himself, Kee, and Miriam (revealed to be Kee's midwife) to the secluded hideaway of Jasper Palmer, a bohemian, old friend of Theo.

The group plans to reach the Human Project ship, the Tomorrow, that Julian had scheduled to arrive offshore at Bexhill, a notorious refugee detention centre. Jasper arranges for Syd, an immigration officer to whom Jasper sells cannabis, to smuggle them into Bexhill as refugees, from where they can take a rowboat and rendezvous with the ship. The next day, the Fishes arrive at Jasper's hidden entrance, forcing the group to flee. Jasper stays behind to stall them and is murdered by Luke. At an abandoned school, Syd meets Theo, Kee, and Miriam, and helps them board a bus to the camp where Kee's water breaks; Miriam feigns mental illness as a distraction and is dragged off the bus.

In Bexhill, their contact Marichka, a Romani woman, provides Theo and Kee a room, where Theo helps Kee give birth. The next day, Syd arrives to tell them that fighting has broken out between the military and refugees, and that the Fishes have infiltrated the camp. He reveals that Theo and Kee have a bounty on their heads and attempts to capture them. Marichka and Theo fight off Syd, and the group takes shelter with a kindly, elderly Russian couple.

As they're heading for the rowboat, the Fishes capture Kee and the baby. Luke initially tells Patric and others to spare the group, but once Kee and the baby are out of earshot, Luke tells Patric to kill the Russian couple and Theo. Patric shoots one of the two refugees, but is interrupted by an attack by soldiers. Theo flees and tracks Kee to an apartment building under heavy fire. Theo confronts Luke, who tells Theo "We need him," mistaking the baby for a boy; Theo corrects Luke, who says "I had a sister" before pleading for the child again and subsequently being killed in an explosion.

Awed by the sight of an actual baby, the soldiers and Fishes momentarily stop fighting to allow Theo, Kee and the baby to leave the battle before the violence immediately resumes. Marichka leads them to the rowing boat but stays behind. As fighter jets bomb Bexhill, Theo and Kee row to the buoy rendezvous point. Theo reveals he had been shot, and teaches Kee how to burp her baby. Kee tells him she will name the baby girl Dylan, after Theo's and Julian's lost son. Theo smiles weakly, then loses consciousness as the Tomorrow approaches. As the screen cuts to black, children's laughter is heard.

== Cast ==
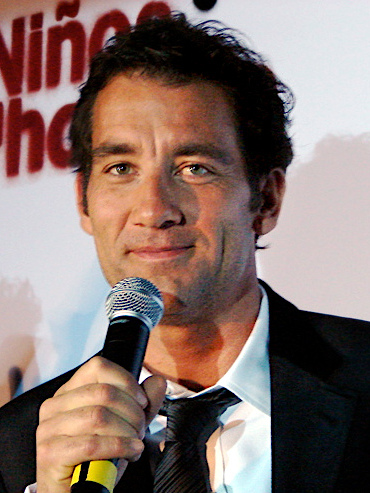
Clive Owen (pictured at the film's premiere in Mexico City, 2006) was cast as the lead role.

- Clive Owen as Thelonius "Theo" Faron, a former activist embittered by the death of his son. Theo is the "archetypal everyman" who reluctantly becomes a saviour. Cast in April 2005, Owen spent several weeks collaborating with Cuarón and Sexton on his role. Impressed by Owen's creative insights, Cuarón and Sexton brought him on board as a writer. "Clive was a big help", Cuarón told Variety. "I would send a group of scenes to him, and then I would hear his feedback and instincts."
- Clare-Hope Ashitey as Kee, a refugee and former prostitute who is the world's first pregnant woman in eighteen years. She did not appear in the book, and was written into the film based on Cuarón's interest in the recent single-origin hypothesis of human origins and the status of dispossessed people: "The fact that this child will be the child of an African woman has to do with the fact that humanity started in Africa. We're putting the future of humanity in the hands of the dispossessed and creating a new humanity to spring out of that."
- Julianne Moore as Julian Taylor, the leader of the refugee liberation group known as the "Fishes". For Julian, Cuarón wanted an actress who had the "credibility of leadership, intelligence, [and] independence". Moore was cast in June 2005, initially to play the first woman to become pregnant in 20 years. "She is just so much fun to work with", Cuarón told Cinematical. "She is just pulling the rug out from under your feet all the time. You don't know where to stand, because she is going to make fun of you."
- Michael Caine as Jasper Palmer, Theo's friend and a former political cartoonist. Caine based Jasper on his experiences with his friend John Lennon – the first time he had portrayed a character who would fart or smoke cannabis. Cuarón explains, "Once he had the clothes and so on and stepped in front of the mirror to look at himself, his body language started changing. Michael loved it. He believed he was this guy". Michael Phillips of the Chicago Tribune notices an apparent homage to Schwartz from Orson Welles' film noir Touch of Evil (1958). Jasper calls Theo "amigo"—just as Schwartz referred to Ramon Miguel Vargas. Jasper's cartoons, seen in his house, were provided by Steve Bell.
- Pam Ferris as Miriam, a midwife taking care of Kee.
- Chiwetel Ejiofor as Luke, the second-in-command of the "Fishes".
- Charlie Hunnam as Patric, a "Fishes" soldier.
- Peter Mullan as Syd, an immigration cop.
- Oana Pellea as Marichka, a Romani woman who helps Theo and Kee in Bexhill detention centre.
- Danny Huston as Nigel, Theo's cousin and a high-ranking government official. Nigel runs a Ministry of Arts program "Ark of the Arts", which "rescues" works of art such as Michelangelo's David, Pablo Picasso's Guernica, and Banksy's Kissing Coppers.
- Paul Sharma as Ian, a "Fishes" leader.
- Jacek Koman as Tomasz, a "Fishes" soldier.
- Juan Gabriel Yacuzzi as 'Baby' Diego, the world's youngest surviving human, born shortly before the global infertility incident.
- Ed Westwick as Alex, Nigel's son

== Production ==
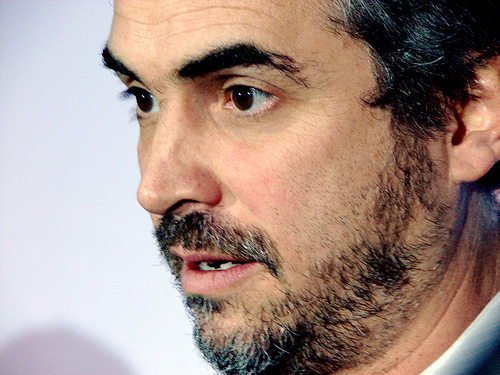
Director Alfonso Cuarón (pictured at the film's premiere in Mexico City, 2006) did not read the novel the film is based on, only a summary.

The option for the book was acquired by Beacon Pictures in 1997. The adaptation of the P. D. James novel was originally written by Paul Chart, and later rewritten by Mark Fergus and Hawk Ostby. The studio brought director Alfonso Cuarón on board in 2001. Cuarón and screenwriter Timothy J. Sexton began rewriting the script after the director completed Y tu mamá también. Afraid he would "start second guessing things", Cuarón chose not to read P. D. James' novel, opting to have Sexton read the book while Cuarón himself read an abridged version. Cuarón did not immediately begin production, instead directing Harry Potter and the Prisoner of Azkaban. During this period, David Arata rewrote the screenplay and delivered the draft which secured Clive Owen and sent the film into pre-production. The director's work experience in the United Kingdom exposed him to the "social dynamics of the British psyche", giving him insight into the depiction of "British reality". Cuarón used the film The Battle of Algiers as a model for social reconstruction in preparation for production, presenting the film to Clive Owen as an example of his vision for Children of Men. In order to create a philosophical and social framework for the film, the director read literature by Slavoj Žižek, as well as similar works. The 1927 film Sunrise: A Song of Two Humans was also influential.

=== Location ===
A Clockwork Orange was one of the inspirations for the futuristic, yet battered patina of 2027 London. Children of Men was the second film Cuarón made in London, with the director portraying the city using single, wide shots. While Cuarón was preparing the film, the London bombings occurred, but the director did not consider moving the production. "It would have been impossible to shoot anywhere but London, because of the very obvious way the locations were incorporated into the film", Cuarón told Variety. "For example, the shot of Fleet Street looking towards St. Paul's would have been impossible to shoot anywhere else." Due to these circumstances, the opening terrorist attack scene on Fleet Street was shot a month and a half after the London bombing.

Cuarón chose to shoot some scenes in East London, a location he considered "a place without glamour". The set locations were dressed to make them appear even more run-down; Cuarón says he told the crew "'Let's make it more Mexican'. In other words, we'd look at a location and then say: yes, but in Mexico there would be this and this. It was about making the place look run-down. It was about poverty." He also made use of London's most popular sites, shooting in locations like Trafalgar Square and Battersea Power Station. The power station scene (whose conversion into an art archive is a reference to the Tate Modern), has been compared to Antonioni's Red Desert. Cuarón added a pig balloon to the scene as homage to Pink Floyd's Animals. Other art works visible in this scene include Michelangelo's David, Picasso's Guernica, and Banksy's Kissing Coppers. London visual effects companies Double Negative and Framestore worked directly with Cuarón from script to post production, developing effects and creating "environments and shots that wouldn't otherwise be possible".

The Historic Dockyard in Chatham was used to film the scene in the empty activist safehouse.

The Shard tower was digitally added to London's skyline based on early architectural drawings as when the film was made the skyscraper had not yet been built but would have been by the time of the film's setting.

=== Style and design ===
"In most sci-fi epics, special effects substitute for story. Here they seamlessly advance it", observes Colin Covert of Star Tribune. Billboards were designed to balance a contemporary and futuristic appearance as well as easily visualizing what else was occurring in the rest of the world at the time, and cars were made to resemble modern ones at first glance, although a closer look made them seem unfamiliar. Cuarón informed the art department that the film was the "anti-Blade Runner", rejecting technologically advanced proposals and downplaying the science fiction elements of the 2027 setting. The director focused on images reflecting the contemporary period.

References to the 2012 Summer Olympics were included in the film as London had been announced as the host city in July 2005, a few months before filming took place.

=== Single-shot sequences ===
Children of Men used several lengthy single-shot sequences in which extremely complex actions take place. The longest of these include a shot in which Kee gives birth (3m19s); an ambush on a country road (4m7s); and a scene in which Theo is captured by the Fishes, escapes, and runs down a street and through a building in the middle of a raging battle (6m18s). These sequences were extremely difficult to film, although the effect of continuity is sometimes an illusion, aided by computer-generated imagery (CGI) effects and the use of 'seamless cuts' to enhance the long takes.

Cuarón had experimented with long takes in Great Expectations, Y tu mamá también, and Harry Potter and the Prisoner of Azkaban. His style is influenced by the Swiss film Jonah Who Will Be 25 in the Year 2000, one of his favourites. He said "I was studying cinema when I first saw [Jonah], and interested in the French New Wave. Jonah was so unflashy compared with those films. The camera keeps a certain distance and there are relatively few close-ups. It's elegant and flowing, constantly tracking, but very slowly and not calling attention to itself."

The creation of the single-shot sequences was a challenging, time-consuming process that sparked concerns from the studio. It took fourteen days to prepare for the single shot in which Clive Owen's character searches a building under attack and five hours every time they wanted to reshoot it. In the middle of one shot, blood splattered onto the lens, and cinematographer Emmanuel Lubezki convinced the director to leave it in. According to Owen, "Right in the thick of it are me and the camera operator because we're doing this very complicated, very specific dance which, when we come to shoot, we have to make feel completely random."

Cuarón's initial idea for maintaining continuity during the roadside ambush scene was dismissed by production experts as an "impossible shot to do". Fresh from the visual effects-laden Harry Potter and the Prisoner of Azkaban, Cuarón suggested using computer-generated imagery to film the scene. Lubezki refused to allow it, reminding the director that they had intended to make a film akin to a "raw documentary". Instead, a special camera rig invented by Gary Thieltges of Doggicam Systems was employed, allowing Cuarón to develop the scene as one extended shot. A vehicle was modified to enable seats to tilt and lower actors out of the way of the camera, and the windshield was designed to tilt out of the way to allow camera movement in and out through the front windscreen. A crew of four, including the director of photography and camera operator, rode on the roof.

However, the commonly reported statement that the action scenes are continuous shots is not entirely true. Visual effects supervisor Frazer Churchill explains that the effects team had to "combine several takes to create impossibly long shots", where their job was to "create the illusion of a continuous camera move". Once the team was able to create a "seamless blend", they would move on to the next shot. These techniques were important for three continuous shots: the coffee shop explosion in the opening shot, the car ambush, and the battlefield scene. The coffee shop scene was composed of "two different takes shot over two consecutive days"; the car ambush was shot in "six sections and at four different locations over one week and required five seamless digital transitions"; and the battlefield scene "was captured in five separate takes over two locations". Churchill and the Double Negative team created over 160 of these types of effects for the film. In an interview with Variety, Cuarón acknowledged this nature of the "single-shot" action sequences: "Maybe I'm spilling a big secret, but sometimes it's more than what it looks like. The important thing is how you blend everything and how you keep the perception of a fluid choreography through all of these different pieces."

Tim Webber of VFX house Framestore CFC was responsible for the three-and-a-half-minute single take of Kee giving birth, helping to choreograph and create the CG effects of the childbirth. Cuarón had originally intended to use an animatronic baby as Kee's child with the exception of the childbirth scene. In the end, two takes were shot, with the second take concealing Clare-Hope Ashitey's legs, replacing them with prosthetic legs. Cuarón was pleased with the results of the effect, and returned to previous shots of the baby in animatronic form, replacing them with Framestore's computer-generated baby.

=== Sound ===
Cuarón used a combination of rock, pop, electronic music, hip-hop and classical music for the film's soundtrack. Ambient sounds of traffic, barking dogs, and advertisements follow the character of Theo through London, East Sussex and Kent, producing what Los Angeles Times writer Kevin Crust called an "urban audio rumble". Crust considered that the music comments indirectly on the barren world of Children of Men: Deep Purple's version of "Hush" playing from Jasper's car radio becomes a "sly lullaby for a world without babies" while King Crimson's "The Court of the Crimson King" make a similar allusion with their lyrics, "three lullabies in an ancient tongue".

Amongst a genre-spanning selection of electronic music, a remix of Aphex Twin's "Omgyjya-Switch7", which includes the 'Male Thijs Loud Scream' audio sample by Thanvannispen can be heard during an early scene in Jasper's house. During a conversation between the two men, Radiohead's "Life in a Glasshouse" plays in the background. A number of dubstep tracks, including "Anti-War Dub" by Digital Mystikz, as well as tracks by Kode9 & The Spaceape, Pinch and Pressure are also featured.

For the Bexhill scenes during the film's second half, Cuarón makes use of silence and cacophonous sound effects such as the firing of automatic weapons and loudspeakers directing the movement of refugees. Classical music by George Frideric Handel, Gustav Mahler, Dmitri Shostakovich and Krzysztof Penderecki's "Threnody to the Victims of Hiroshima" complements the chaos of the refugee camp. Throughout the film, John Tavener's Fragments of a Prayer is used as a spiritual motif.

== Themes ==
=== Hope and faith ===
Children of Men explores the themes of hope and faith in the face of overwhelming futility and despair. The film's source, P. D. James' novel The Children of Men (1992), describes what happens when society is unable to reproduce, using male infertility to explain this problem. In the novel, it is made clear that hope depends on future generations. James writes "It was reasonable to struggle, to suffer, perhaps even to die, for a more just, a more compassionate society, but not in a world with no future where, all too soon, the very words 'justice', 'compassion', 'society', 'struggle', 'evil', would be unheard echoes on an empty air."

The film does not explain the cause of the infertility, although environmental destruction and divine punishment are considered. Cuarón has attributed this unanswered question (and others in the film) to his dislike for the purely expository film: "There's a kind of cinema I detest, which is a cinema that is about exposition and explanations ... It's become now what I call a medium for lazy readers ... Cinema is a hostage of narrative. And I'm very good at narrative as a hostage of cinema." Cuarón's disdain for back-story and exposition led him to use the concept of infertility as a "metaphor for the fading sense of hope". The "almost mythical" Human Project is turned into a "metaphor for the possibility of the evolution of the human spirit, the evolution of human understanding". Cuarón believed that explaining things such as the cause of the infertility and the Human Project would create a "pure science-fiction movie", removing focus from the story as a metaphor for hope. Without dictating how the audience should feel by the end of the film, Cuarón encourages viewers to come to their own conclusions about the sense of hope depicted in the final scenes: "We wanted the end to be a glimpse of a possibility of hope, for the audience to invest their own sense of hope into that ending. So if you're a hopeful person you'll see a lot of hope, and if you're a bleak person you'll see a complete hopelessness at the end."

=== Religion ===
Richard Blake, writing for Catholic magazine America, suggested that like Virgil's Aeneid, Dante's The Divine Comedy, and Chaucer's The Canterbury Tales, the crux of the journey in Children of Men lies in what is uncovered along the path rather than the terminus itself.

According to Cuarón, the title of P. D. James' book (The Children of Men) is an allegory derived from a passage of scripture in the Bible. (Psalm 90 (89):3 of the King James Version: "Thou turnest man to destruction; and sayest, Return, ye children of men") James refers to her story as a "Christian fable" while Cuarón describes it as "almost like a look at Christianity": "I didn't want to shy away from the spiritual archetypes", Cuarón told Filmmaker Magazine. "But I wasn't interested in dealing with dogma."

Ms. James's nativity story is, in Mr. Cuarón's version, set against the image of a prisoner in an orange smock with a black bag on his head, arms stretched out as if on a cross.

— Manohla Dargis,

This divergence from the original was criticised by some, including Anthony Sacramone of First Things, who called the film "an act of vandalism", noting the irony of how Cuarón had removed religion from P.D. James' fable, in which morally sterile nihilism is overcome by Christianity.

The film has been noted for its use of Christian symbolism; for example, British terrorists named "Fishes" protect the rights of refugees. Opening on Christmas Day in the United States, critics compared the characters of Theo and Kee with Joseph and Mary, calling the film a "modern-day Nativity story". Kee's pregnancy is revealed to Theo in a barn, alluding to the manger of the Nativity scene; when Theo asks Kee who the father of the baby is she jokingly states she is a virgin; and when other characters discover Kee and her baby, they respond with "Jesus Christ" or the sign of the cross.

To highlight these spiritual themes, Cuarón commissioned a 15-minute piece by British composer John Tavener, a member of the Eastern Orthodox Church whose work resonates with the themes of "motherhood, birth, rebirth, and redemption in the eyes of God". Calling his score a "musical and spiritual reaction to Alfonso's film", snippets of Tavener's "Fragments of a Prayer" contain lyrics in Latin, German, and Sanskrit sung by mezzo-soprano Sarah Connolly. Words like "mata" (mother), "pahi mam" (protect me), "avatara" (saviour), and "alleluia" appear throughout the film.

In the closing credits, the Sanskrit words "Shantih Shantih Shantih" appear as end titles. Writer and film critic Laura Eldred of the University of North Carolina at Chapel Hill observes that Children of Men is "full of tidbits that call out to the educated viewer". During a visit to his house by Theo and Kee, Jasper says "Shanti, shanti, shanti". Eldred notes that the "shanti" used in the film is also found at the end of an Upanishad and in the final line of T. S. Eliot's poem The Waste Land, a work Eldred describes as "devoted to contemplating a world emptied of fertility: a world on its last, teetering legs". "Shanti" is also a common beginning and ending to all Hindu prayers, and means "peace", referencing the invocation of divine intervention and rebirth through an end to violence.

=== Contemporary references ===
Children of Men takes an unconventional approach to the modern action film, using a documentary, newsreel style. Film critics Michael Rowin, Jason Guerrasio and Ethan Alter observe the film's underlying touchstone of immigration. For Alter and other critics, the structural support and impetus for the contemporary references rests upon the visual nature of the film's exposition, occurring in the form of imagery as opposed to conventional dialogue. Other popular images appear, such as a sign over the refugee camp reading "Homeland Security". The similarity between the hellish, cinéma vérité stylised battle scenes of the film and current news and documentary coverage of the Iraq War, is noted by film critic Manohla Dargis, describing Cuarón's fictional landscapes as "war zones of extraordinary plausibility".

In the film, refugees are "hunted down like cockroaches", rounded up and put into roofless cages open to the elements and camps, and even shot, leading film critics like Chris Smith and Claudia Puig to observe symbolic "overtones" and images of the Holocaust. This is reinforced in the scene where an elderly refugee woman speaking German is seen detained in a cage, and in the scene where government agents strip and assault refugees the song "Arbeit Macht Frei" by The Libertines, from Arbeit macht frei, plays in the background. "The visual allusions to the Nazi round-ups are unnerving", writes Richard A. Blake. "It shows what people can become when the government orchestrates their fears for its own advantage."

Cuarón explains how he uses imagery in his fictional and futuristic events to allude to real, contemporary or historical incidents and beliefs,

They exit the Russian apartments, and the next shot you see is this woman wailing, holding the body of her son in her arms. This was a reference to a real photograph of a woman holding the body of her son in the Balkans, crying with the corpse of her son. It's very obvious that when the photographer captured that photograph, he was referencing La Pietà, the Michelangelo sculpture of Mary holding the corpse of Jesus. So: We have a reference to something that really happened, in the Balkans, which is itself a reference to the Michelangelo sculpture. At the same time, we use the sculpture of David early on, which is also by Michelangelo, and we have of course the whole reference to the Nativity. And so everything was referencing and cross-referencing, as much as we could.

== Release ==
=== Box office ===
Children of Men had its world premiere at the 63rd Venice International Film Festival on 3 September 2006. On 22 September 2006, the film debuted at number 1 in the United Kingdom with $2.4 million in 368 screens. It debuted in a limited release of 16 theaters in the United States on 22 December 2006, expanding to more than 1,200 theaters on 5 January 2007. As of 6 February 2008, Children of Men had grossed $69,612,678 worldwide, with $35,552,383 of the revenue generated in the United States.

=== Home media ===
The HD-DVD and DVD were released in Europe on 15 January 2007 and in the United States on 27 March 2007. Extras include a half-hour documentary by director Alfonso Cuarón, entitled The Possibility of Hope (2007), which explores the intersection between the film's themes and reality with a critical analysis by eminent scholars: the Slovenian sociologist and philosopher Slavoj Žižek, anti-globalization activist Naomi Klein, environmentalist futurist James Lovelock, sociologist Saskia Sassen, human geographer Fabrizio Eva, cultural theorist Tzvetan Todorov, and philosopher and economist John N. Gray. "Under Attack" features a demonstration of the innovative techniques required for the car chase and battle scenes; in "Theo & Julian", Clive Owen and Julianne Moore discuss their characters; "Futuristic Design" opens the door on the production design and look of the film; "Visual Effects" shows how the digital baby was created. Deleted scenes are included. The film was released on Blu-ray Disc in the United States on 26 May 2009.

== Reception ==
=== Critical response ===
Children of Men received critical acclaim; on the review aggregator website Rotten Tomatoes, the film received a 92% approval rating based on 252 reviews from critics. The site's critical consensus states: "Children of Men works on every level: as a violent chase thriller, a fantastical cautionary tale, and a sophisticated human drama about societies struggling to live." On Metacritic, the film has a score of 84 out of 100, based on 38 reviews, indicating "universal acclaim". Audiences polled by CinemaScore gave the film an average grade "B−" on an A+ to F scale.

Roger Ebert of the Chicago Sun-Times gave the film four stars out of four, writing, "Cuarón fulfills the promise of futuristic fiction; characters do not wear strange costumes or visit the moon, and the cities are not plastic hallucinations, but look just like today, except tired and shabby. Here is certainly a world ending not with a bang but a whimper, and the film serves as a cautionary warning." Dana Stevens of Slate called it "the herald of another blessed event: the arrival of a great director by the name of Alfonso Cuarón". Stevens hailed the film's extended car chase and battle scenes as "two of the most virtuoso single-shot chase sequences I've ever seen". Manohla Dargis of The New York Times called the film a "superbly directed political thriller", raining accolades on the long chase scenes. "Easily one of the best films of the year" said Ethan Alter of Film Journal International, with scenes that "dazzle you with their technical complexity and visual virtuosity". Jonathan Romney of The Independent praised the accuracy of Cuarón's portrait of the United Kingdom, but he criticized some of the film's futuristic scenes as "run-of-the-mill future fantasy". Film Comment's critics' poll of the best films of 2006 ranked the film number 19, while the 2006 readers' poll ranked it number two. On their list of the best movies of 2006, The A.V. Club, the San Francisco Chronicle, Slate, and The Washington Post placed the film at number one. Entertainment Weekly ranked the film seventh on its end-of-the-decade top 10 list, saying, "Alfonso Cuarón's dystopian 2006 film reminded us that adrenaline-juicing action sequences can work best when the future looks just as grimy as today".

Peter Travers of Rolling Stone ranked it number two on his list of best films of the decade, writing:

I thought director Alfonso Cuarón's film of P.D. James' futuristic political-fable novel was good when it opened in 2006. After repeated viewings, I know Children of Men is indisputably great ... No movie this decade was more redolent of sorrowful beauty and exhilarating action. You don't just watch the car ambush scene (pure camera wizardry)—you live inside it. That's Cuarón's magic: He makes you believe."

According to Metacritic's analysis of the films most often noted on the best-of-the-decade lists, Children of Men is the 11th greatest film of the 2000s.

In the book 501 Must-See Movies, Rob Hill lauds the movie for its dystopian portrayal of the future and its adept exploration of contemporary issues. Hill highlights the film's societal stagnation and the magnetizing effect of Britain on immigrants and terrorists, emphasizing the director's intelligence in weaving speculative narratives with real-world reflections. He applauds Cuarón's skill in creating a cinematic mirror that resonates with audiences by addressing pressing political and social concerns, all within a compelling dystopian framework.

In the wake of the European migrant crisis since 2015, the British withdrawal from the European Union of the late 2010s, the first presidency of Donald Trump (2017–2021), and the COVID-19 pandemic beginning in 2020, all of which involved divisive debates about immigration and increasing border enforcement, several commentators reappraised the film's importance, with many calling it "prescient". (Note: Attributed to multiple sources:)

=== Top 10 lists ===
The film appeared on many critics' top 10 lists as one of the best films of 2006:

- 1st – Ann Hornaday, The Washington Post
- 1st – Keith Phipps, The A.V. Club
- 1st – Peter Hartlaub, San Francisco Chronicle
- 1st – Tasha Robinson, The A.V. Club
- 2nd (of the decade) – Peter Travers, Rolling Stone
- 2nd – Ray Bennett, The Hollywood Reporter
- 2nd – Scott Tobias, The A.V. Club
- 3rd – Roger Ebert, Chicago Sun-Times
- 4th – Kevin Crust, Los Angeles Times
- 4th – Wesley Morris, The Boston Globe
- 5th – Rene Rodriguez, The Miami Herald
- 6th – Manohla Dargis, The New York Times
- 7th – Empire
- 7th – Kirk Honeycutt, The Hollywood Reporter
- 7th – Ty Burr, The Boston Globe
- 8th – Kenneth Turan, Los Angeles Times (tied with Pan's Labyrinth)
- 8th – Scott Foundas, LA Weekly (tied with L'Enfant)
- 8th – Scott Foundas, The Village Voice
- Unordered – Dana Stevens, Slate
- Unordered – Liam Lacey and Rick Groen, The Globe and Mail
- Unordered – Peter Rainer, The Christian Science Monitor

In 2012, director Marc Webb included the film on his list of Top 10 Greatest Films when asked by Sight & Sound for his votes for the BFI The Top 50 Greatest Films of All Time. In 2015, the film was named number one on an all-time Top 10 Movies list by the blog Pop Culture Philosopher. In 2016, it was voted 13th among 100 films considered the best of the 21st century by 117 film critics from around the world. In 2017, Rolling Stone magazine ranked Children of Men as the best Sci-fi film of the 21st century. In 2021, members of Writers Guild of America West (WGAW) and Writers Guild of America, East (WGAE) ranked its screenplay 18th in WGA's 101 Greatest Screenplays of the 21st Century (so far). In 2023, Time listed the film as one of the best 100 movies from the past 10 decades. That same year, filmmaker Denis Villeneuve listed the film as one of his favorites. In June 2025, the film ranked number 13 on The New York Times' list of "The 100 Best Movies of the 21st Century" and number 21 on the "Readers' Choice" edition of the list. In July 2025, it ranked number 27 on Rolling Stone's list of "The 100 Best Movies of the 21st Century."

=== Accolades ===
P. D. James was reported to be pleased with the film, and the screenwriters of Children of Men were awarded the 19th annual USC Scripter Award for the screen adaptation of the novel.

Award	Ceremony date	Category	Recipient(s)	Result	Ref.
Academy Awards	25 February 2007	Best Adapted Screenplay	Alfonso Cuarón, Timothy J. Sexton, David Arata, Mark Fergus & Hawk Ostby	Nominated	
Academy Awards	25 February 2007	Best Cinematography	Emmanuel Lubezki	Nominated	
Academy Awards	25 February 2007	Best Editing	Alfonso Cuarón and Álex Rodríguez	Nominated	
BAFTA Awards	11 February 2007	Best Cinematography	Emmanuel Lubezki	Won	
BAFTA Awards	11 February 2007	Best Production Design	Jim Clay, Geoffrey Kirkland, and Jennifer Williams	Won	
BAFTA Awards	11 February 2007	Best Special Visual Effects	Frazer Churchill, Tim Webber, Mike Eames, and Paul Corbould	Nominated	
ALMA Awards	1 June 2007	Outstanding Director - Motion Picture	Alfonso Cuarón	Nominated	
ALMA Awards	1 June 2007	Outstanding Screenplay - Motion Picture	Alfonso Cuarón, David Arata, Timothy J. Sexton, Mark Fergus, Hawk Ostby	Nominated	
American Society of Cinematographers		Best Cinematography	Emmanuel Lubezki	Won	
Australian Cinematographers Society		International Award for Cinematography	Emmanuel Lubezki	Won	
British Society of Cinematographers		Best Cinematography	Emmanuel Lubezki	Nominated	
Black Reel Awards	7 February 2007	Best Supporting Actor	Chiwetel Ejiofor	Nominated	
Black Reel Awards	7 February 2007	Best Supporting Actress	Clare-Hope Ashitey	Nominated	
Hugo Awards	1 September 2007	Best Dramatic Presentation, Long Form	Alfonso Cuarón, Timothy J. Sexton, David Arata, Mark Fergus, Hawk Ostby, P.D. James	Nominated	
Online Film Critics Society	8 January 2007	Best Picture	Children of Men	Nominated	
Online Film Critics Society	8 January 2007	Best Director	Alfonso Cuarón	Nominated	
Online Film Critics Society	8 January 2007	Best Adapted Screenplay	Alfonso Cuarón, David Arata, Timothy J. Sexton, Mark Fergus, Hawk Ostby	Won	
Online Film Critics Society	8 January 2007	Best Cinematography	Emmanuel Lubezki	Won	
Online Film Critics Society	8 January 2007	Best Editing	Alfonso Cuarón and Alex Rodríguez	Nominated	
Saturn Awards	10 May 2007	Best Science Fiction Film	Children of Men	Won	
Saturn Awards	10 May 2007	Best Director	Alfonso Cuarón	Nominated	.
Saturn Awards	10 May 2007	Best Actor	Clive Owen	Nominated	.
Satellite Awards	16 December 2007	Best Overall DVD	N/a	Nominated	
University of Southern California		USC Scripter Award	Screenwriters	Won	
Venice International Film Festival	9 September 2006	Golden Lion	Alfonso Cuarón	Nominated	
Venice International Film Festival	9 September 2006	Golden Osella for Cinematography	Emmanuel Lubezki	Won	
