= The Prince Albert, Brighton =

Listed pub and music venue in East Sussex, England

The Prince Albert
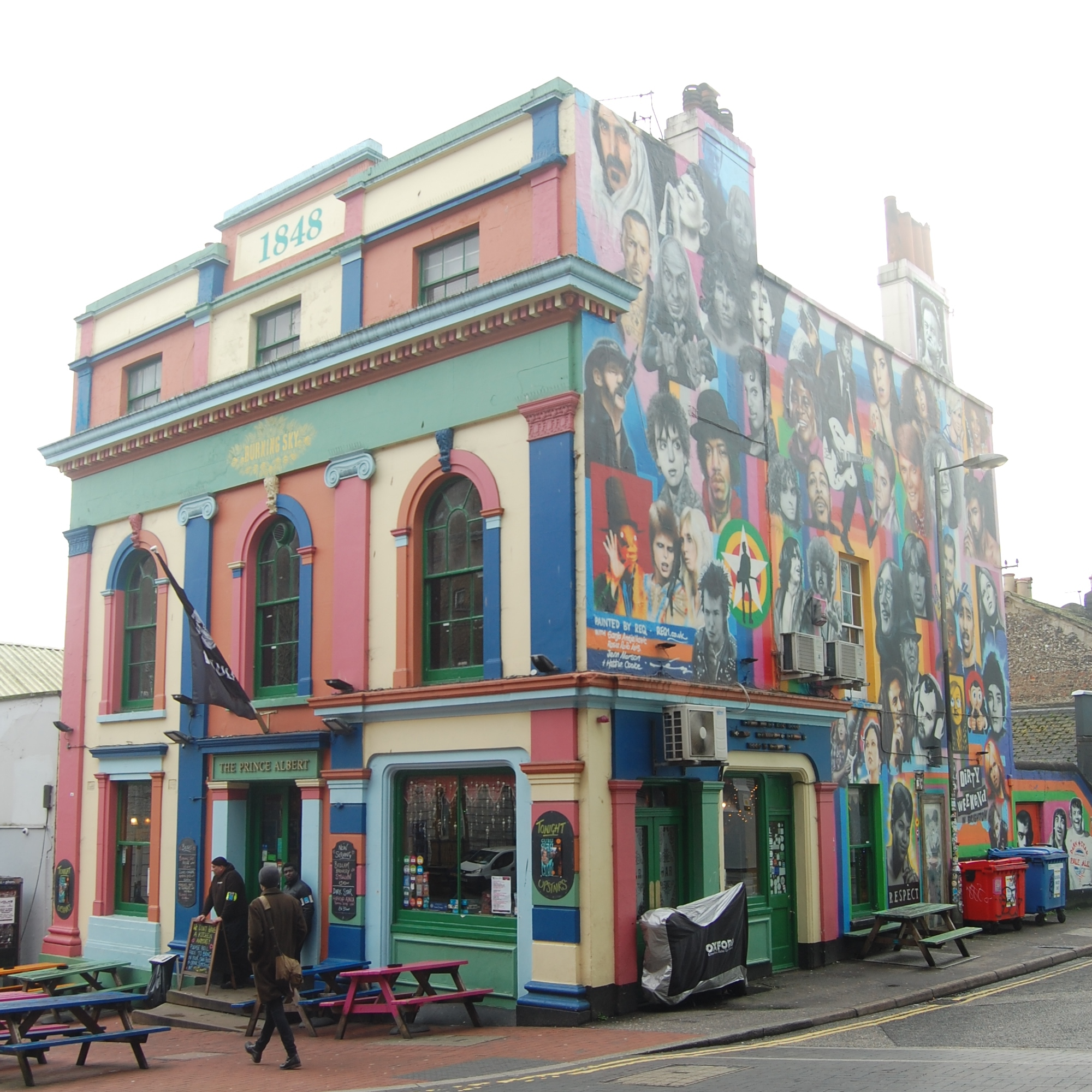
- The pub in 2020

General information
- Type: Public house
- Location: 48 Trafalgar Street, Brighton, England
- Coordinates: 50.8284°N 0.1407°W
- Year built: c. 1845; 181 years ago
- Renovated: 1936 (altered)

Design and construction
- Designations

Listed Building – Grade II
- Official name: The Prince Albert public house
- Designated: 20 August 1971
- Reference no.: 1381035

Website
- princealbertbrighton.co.uk

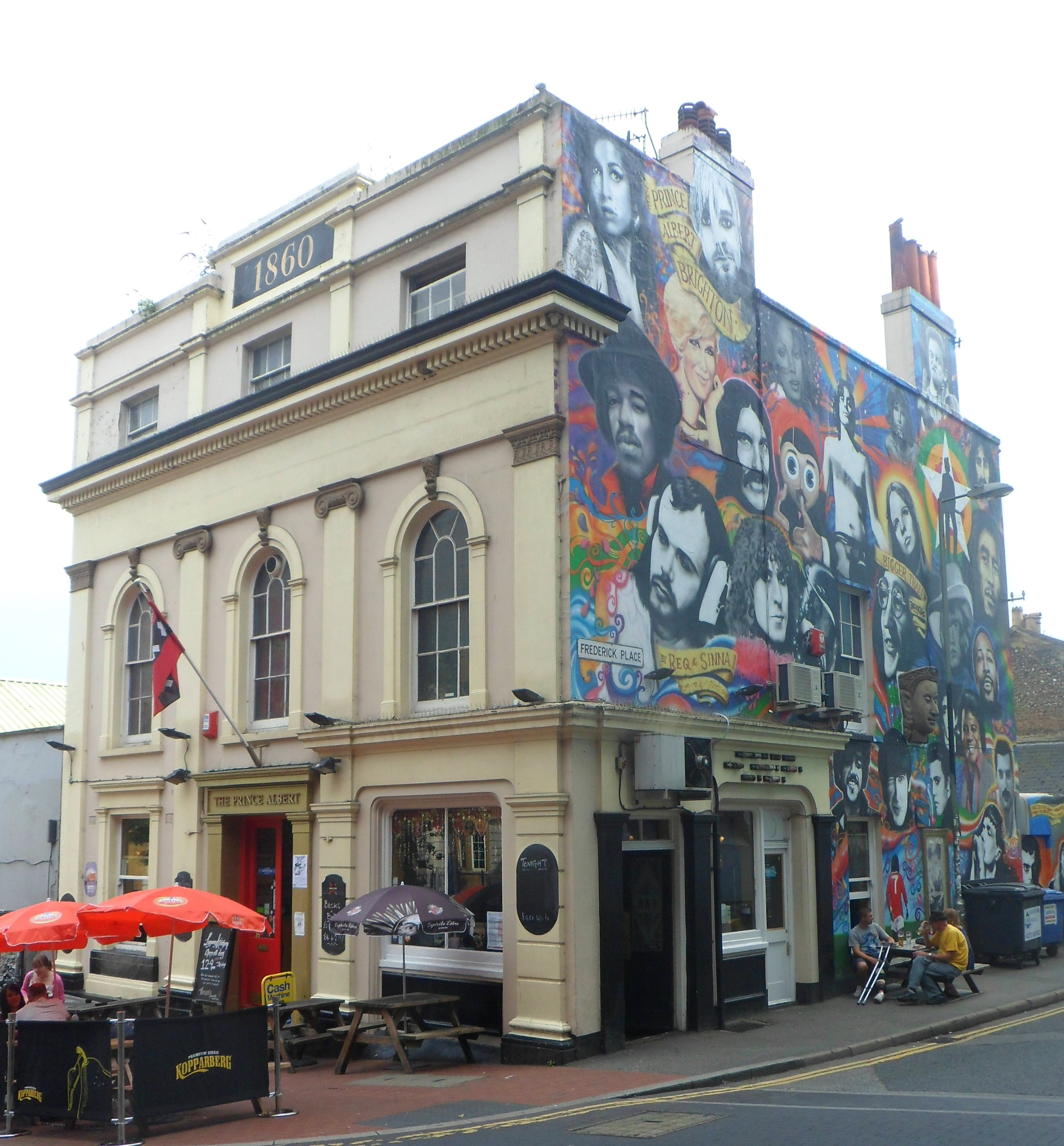
The pub in 2014

The Prince Albert is a Grade II listed public house and music venue on Trafalgar Street in Brighton, England. Dating from the mid-19th century, the building is noted for its largely intact historic interior, which retains a rare multi-room layout and a central servery. The pub is included on the Campaign for Real Ale (CAMRA)'s National Inventory of Historic Pub Interiors, where it is rated three stars and regarded as being of "outstanding national historic importance". It is also known for its association with Brighton's live music scene and for the large "Icons" mural on its exterior wall, depicting musicians and other cultural figures.

== History ==
The public house's official listing dates it to around 1845. According to the Campaign for Real Ale (CAMRA), the pub was built in 1860 and retains a largely intact multi-room layout centred on an historic servery. Alterations carried out for Tamplins Brewery in 1936 introduced a bar counter that survives largely intact. Plans for the 1936 refurbishment remain on display in the former smoking room.

On 20 August 1971, the Prince Albert was designated a Grade II listed building. It is regarded by CAMRA as having an interior of "outstanding national historic importance" and is rated three stars on its National Inventory of Historic Pub Interiors.

== "Icons" mural ==
One of the pub's best-known features is a mural painted on its exterior wall. The site previously displayed Banksy's Kissing Coppers, which appeared in 2004, alongside a mural of broadcaster John Peel. In 2013, local graffiti artists Req and Sinna One added a new mural depicting 26 deceased musicians, together with the actor Oliver Reed and footballer George Best. The figures are largely rendered in monochrome against a multicoloured background. The following musicians were depicted:

- Amy Winehouse
- Bob Marley
- Brian Jones
- Captain Beefheart
- Donna Summer
- Dusty Springfield
- Elvis Presley
- Frank Sidebottom
- Frank Zappa
- Freddie Mercury
- George Harrison
- Ian Curtis
- Ian Dury
- James Brown
- Jim Morrison
- Jimi Hendrix
- Joe Strummer
- John Lennon
- Johnny Cash
- Keith Moon
- Kurt Cobain
- Marc Bolan
- Marvin Gaye
- Michael Jackson
- Phil Lynott
- Sandy Denny
- Syd Barrett

The mural was repainted in 2017 and subsequently updated to include a further 24 deceased musicians. Of the figures depicted in the original version, Brian Jones was omitted from the revised mural, while George Best was later replaced. The identity of one musician depicted on the left-hand chimney stack, between Ian Curtis and Kurt Cobain, has been disputed, with some sources identifying the figure as Merle Haggard. The following musicians were added:

- 2Pac
- Alan Vega
- Aretha Franklin
- Chester Bennington
- Chuck Berry
- David Bowie
- Dolores O'Riordan
- Gary Moore
- George Michael
- Glen Campbell
- Janis Joplin
- Lemmy
- Leonard Cohen
- Lou Reed
- Mark E. Smith
- Mick Ronson
- The Notorious B.I.G.
- Prince
- Ronnie James Dio
- Rory Gallagher
- Sid Vicious
- Tom Petty
- Vivian Stanshall
- Whitney Houston

A new mural was painted in 2019 across the upstairs hallway with depictions of Scott Walker and Pete Shelley.

== Architecture ==
=== Exterior ===
The building is rendered and painted, with its roof hidden behind a parapet. It has three storeys and a double-fronted façade arranged in three bays. The central entrance is framed by classical detailing, while much of the left-hand side retains its original appearance. Alterations to the right-hand side, probably dating from the late 19th century, introduced a larger ground-floor window and revised decoration. The upper floors contain arched sash windows, and the parapet rises slightly at the centre of the frontage. Similar late 19th-century alterations extend along the return frontage on Frederick Place, which includes two additional entrances.

=== Interior ===
The pub preserves a rare five-room layout arranged around a central servery and a panelled bar counter dating from the 1930s, together with features such as wall panelling, fireplaces, fitted cupboards and etched-glass details. Several rooms retain evidence of their historic functions, including a former smoking room, saloon bar and coffee room. An upstairs music room reflects the pub's long association with live music.

== See also ==
- List of landmarks and buildings of Brighton and Hove
- Pubs in Brighton
