= Gary Thieltges =

American cinematographer

- Occupation: Cinematographer

Gary Thieltges is an American cinematographer, owner of Doggicam Systems and best known for inventing camera rigs used on big-budget Hollywood films and television shows. Upon being hired as the director of photography of a beer commercial featuring a dog in 1997, his first invention was the Doggicam, a camera on a stick with a monitor at the operator's eye level to view the picture feed. Thieltges' PowerSlide, a wirelessly controlled camera dolly that rides on super rigid track, was used by cinematographer Emmanuel Lubezki in the famous car ambush scene in Alfonso Cuaron's Children of Men. In 2004, the Society of Operating Cameramen awarded Thieltges their Technical Achievement Award for The Bodymount, a lightweight camera support system that can be worn by an actor and placed anywhere on their body. The Bodymount has been on such actors as Bruce Willis, Angelina Jolie, Eminem in 8 Mile and on Mick Jagger in a music video with Lenny Kravitz, among many others. In 2005, Thieltges was presented with a Technical Achievement Award from the Academy of Motion Pictures Arts & Sciences for the design and development of the Sparrow Head, a lightweight system for remotely controlling the pan and tilt of a camerama.
