= Álex Rodríguez (film editor) =

French-born Mexican film editor

- Born: Alejandro Rodriguez; May 18, 1971 (age 55); Saint-Martin-d'Hères, Isère, France
- Other name: Alex Rodriguez
- Occupation: Film editor

Álex Rodríguez (born May 18, 1971) is a French-born Mexican film editor with more than twenty film credits.

Rodríguez was born in Saint-Martin-d'Hères, a suburb of Grenoble, France.

He has edited several films directed by Alfonso Cuarón, commencing with Y tu mamá también (2001). He and Cuarón were nominated for the Academy Award for Film Editing for the film Children of Men (2006). The critic Wesley Morris described their work as follows: "'Children of Men' has a blistering immediacy that's singular in this age of rapid cutting. Along with Álex Rodríguez, Cuarón cut the picture himself, and while he uses digital effects as enrichment, he builds scenes within the camera's frame rather than just in an editing room. So the film is as theatrical as it is cinematic."
