= Brighton Flint Grotto =

Outsider-art sculpture garden, UK

Coordinates: 50°49′05″N 0°07′42″W

The Brighton Flint Grotto is a sculpture garden, created on Brighton Beach in Brighton, England, between 2013 and 2020 by Rory McCormack, a local fisherman. McCormack is a self-taught artist, though he has trained and worked as a dry-stone waller.

== Development ==
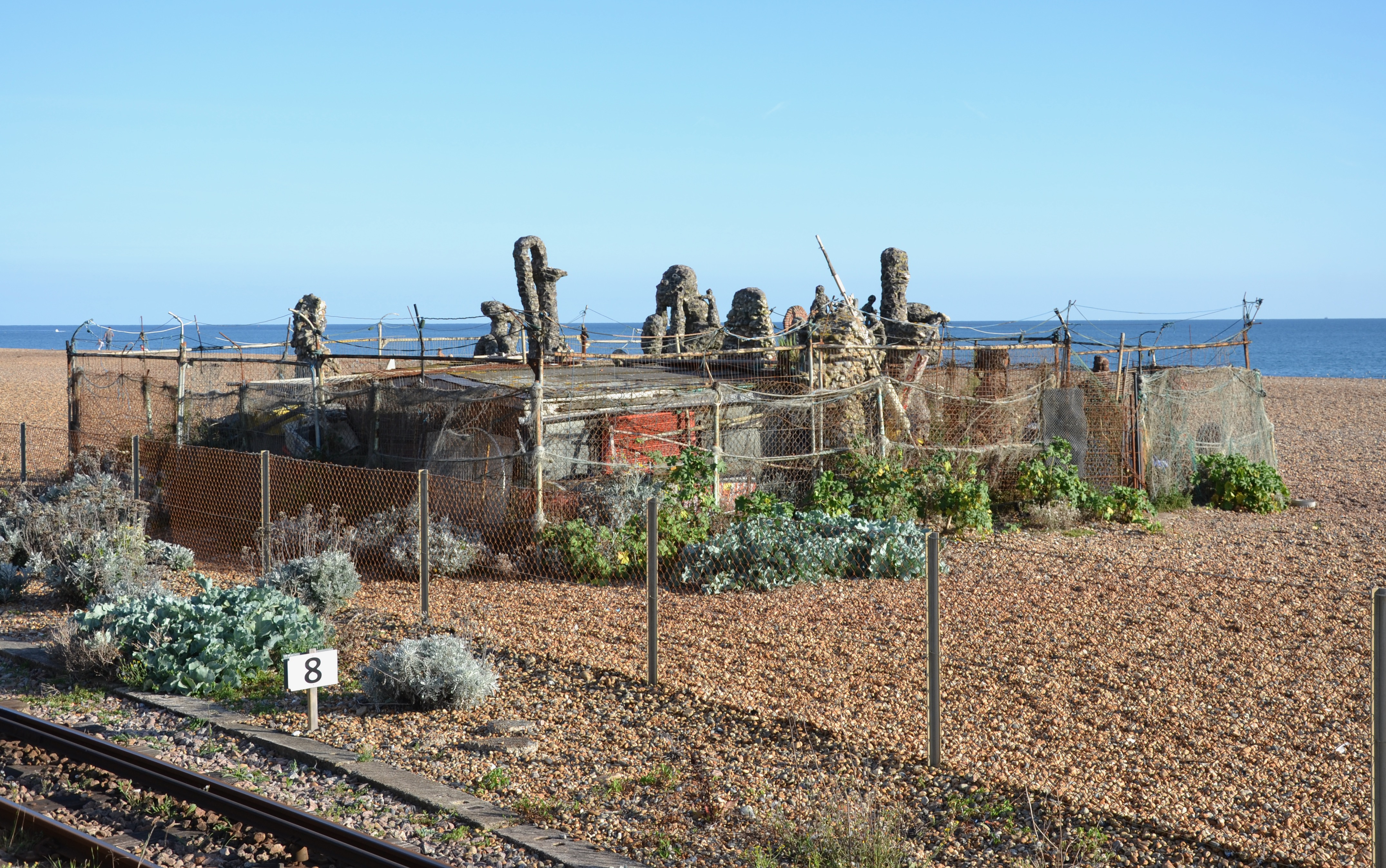
The Brighton Flint Grotto seen from Madeira Drive

The sculpture garden, which McCormack created quietly and without council permission, was first documented in 2015, in Hank Van Es' Outsider Environments Europe blog. It was first named The Flint Grotto in David Bramwell and Tim Bick's Cheeky Guide to Brighton in 2016.

McCormack built the grotto on one of the small plots of land on the beach, allocated by Brighton Council for fishermen to keep their boats, nets and equipment. Over time, most plots were abandoned, until McCormack was the last fisherman in Brighton to keep his boat on the beach. To protect his equipment from vandals, he surrounded the plot with a seven foot high fence. Hank Van Es suggests that "It is not difficult to understand that McCormack gradually came to regard this secluded part of the public beach as his own little world".

McCormack began by creating a garden on his plot. His first structure was a workbench to chop his catches on, made from beach flints and decorated with shells. He followed this with a decorated arch and a series of statues, outsized blow-ups of existing small ancient figurines. These include the Paleolithic Venus of Willendorf, the Neolithic 'Thinker' of Cernavodă in Romania, the bronze Dancing Girl from Mohenjo Daro, four marble Cycladic figurines, including a harp player and an aulos player, a Syro-Hittite mother and child, and a bronze statuette of a Spartan commander from the Wadsworth Atheneum museum. McCormack also created a Bell Beaker culture burial, with a skeleton made of shells and grey flint, half buried in black flint.

In 2015, there were reports in the local news that Brighton Council wanted the statues demolished for health and safety reasons. A spokesman said, "We have real concerns over these structures because some are more than six foot high and have been built on council land without consent so we have to take action before somebody is seriously injured."

Asked about his relationship with the council, McCormack said, "There was one occasion where one of the beach inspectors ...said, "I’m sorry, this has all got to come down", but that was two years after I started and by that time I'd spent two years in the middle of the beach on top of a ladder...sometimes 12, 15 foot off the ground, with the beach inspectors and whatever coming past me with no-one saying a dicky-bird. Then when I finished all the larger figures then they come along and say, "Ah, you shouldn’t have done that". So then I dug my heels in and carried on. That was more than three years ago and I haven't heard anything since."

In 2020, McCormack told David Clegg that the Flint Grotto was finished: "I ran out of space and I was still on a roll...and to my mind I finished it by putting these tiny figures more mischievous and random...sort of frolicking over the tops of the other ones"

Since 2020, McCormack has continued making statues on his allotment by the race hill, documented by David Clegg in the Keeper's Project and in the summer 2023 edition of Raw Vision magazine. His allotment statues are of Taweret, the Egyptian hippopotamus goddess, Bes, Egyptian protector of households, with a vulture on his head, a seated Mexican god with a brazier on his head (used as a bird table), Priapus, the Greek and Roman guardian of orchards and gardens, and a minotaur.

== Style ==
The Flint Grotto is usually described as "outsider art", and it was featured in the Spring 2017 edition of Raw Vision, the British journal dedicated to the form. The art historian Alexandra Loske describes the statues as "sturdy figures rightly likened to outsider art or Arte Povera. They are raw, unconventional and strangely moving, standing silently battered by wind, sun and water...". In an interview for The Keeper's Project, McCormack told the artist David Clegg, "Outsider artist isn’t a bad term, it’s just not the best one. There should be something that fits the bill a bit better – a restless person, with itchy fingers who couldn’t help but keep going".

Recreating the ancient figurines in various materials allowed McCormack to add colour, missing in the originals. He used red brick to create the Spartan's scarlet cloak and helmet crest, the Venus of Willendorf's hair and the Dancing Girl's hair and arm bangles. White stones and shell were used for eyes. He gave a spear and shield to the Spartan.

McCormack also made statues of animals and birds, including a gorilla, an orangutan, and a herring gull wearing a pschent, the double crown of Ancient Egypt (based on statuettes of Horus the sky god as a hawk wearing the crown).

McCormack's fishing boat, which can be seen on the eastern edge of the grotto, is also a work of art, decorated with paintings copied from Greek vases. These include Medusa, sirens, geometric chariots and the sacrifice of the Trojan priestess Polyxena by Diomedes.

== Gallery ==
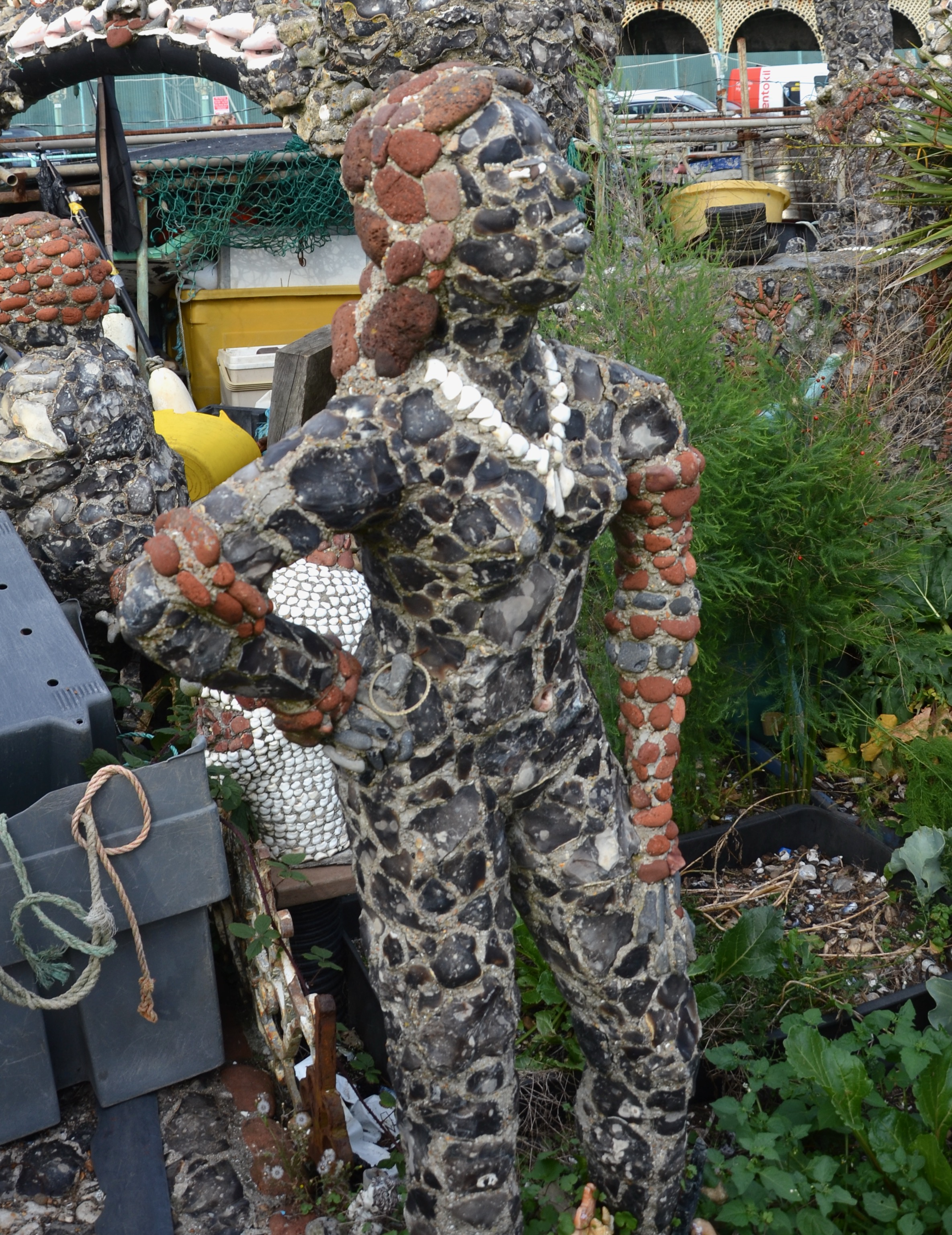
Dancing girl from Mohenjo Daro

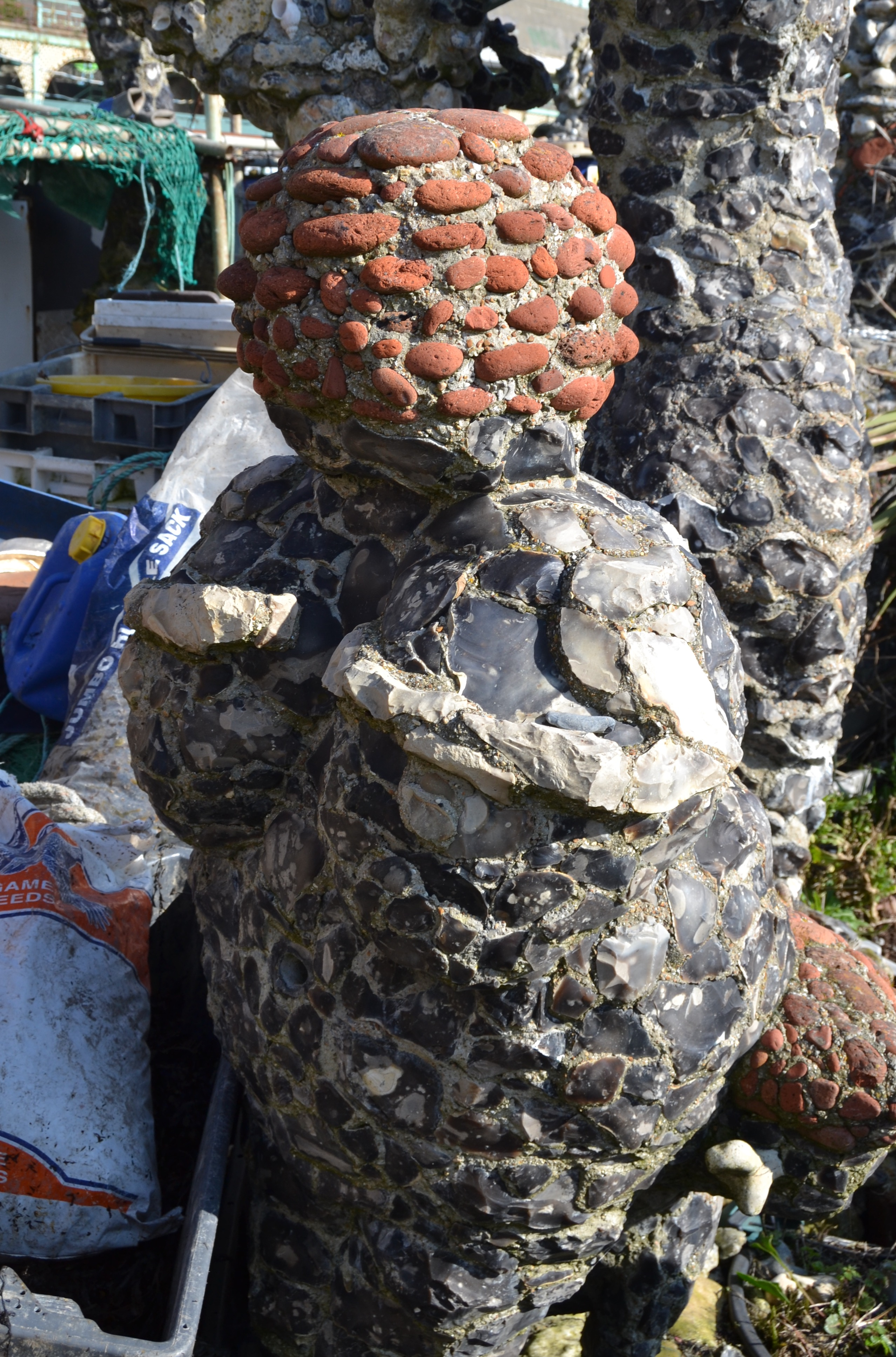
The Venus of Willendorf

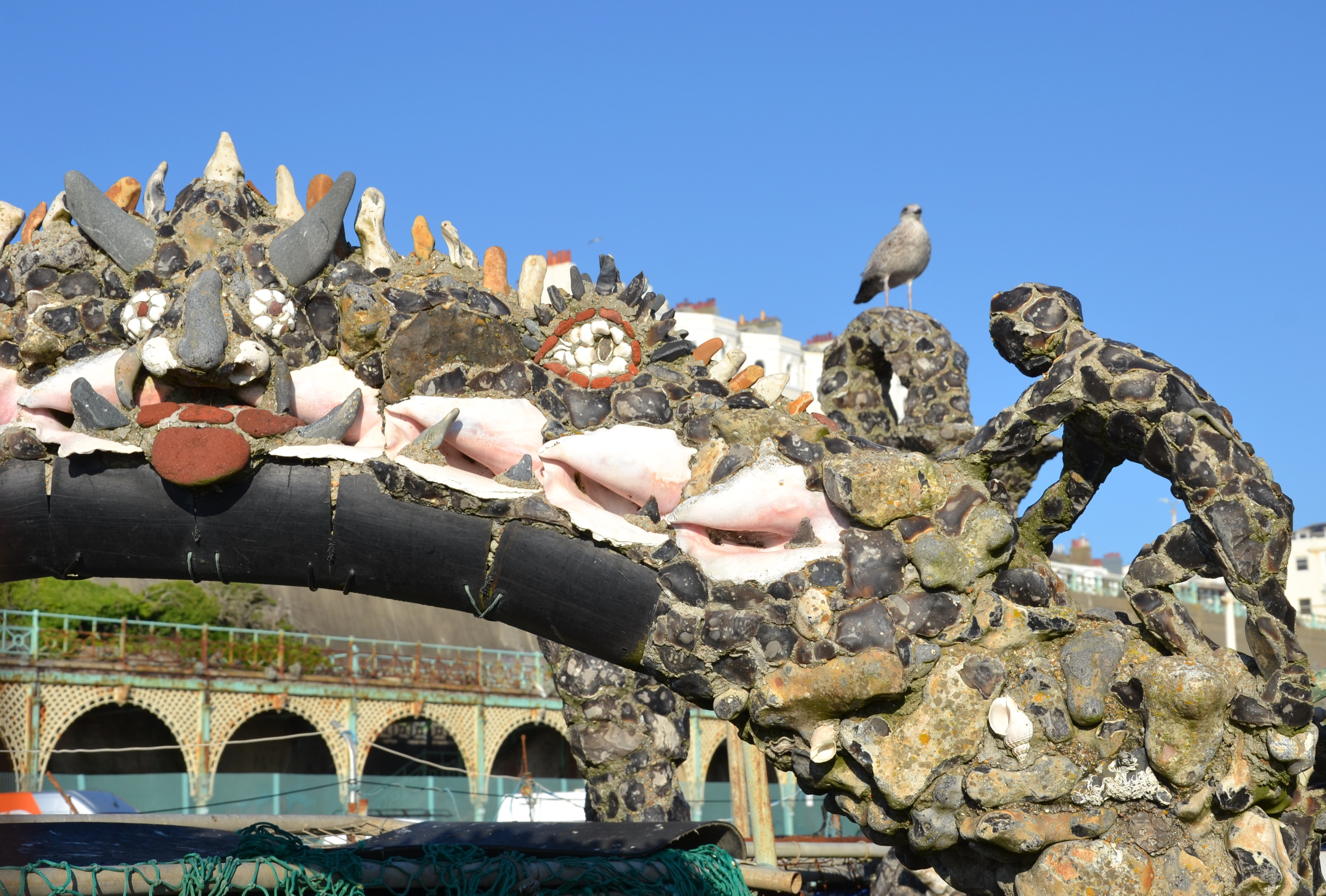
The decorative arch with a small climbing figure

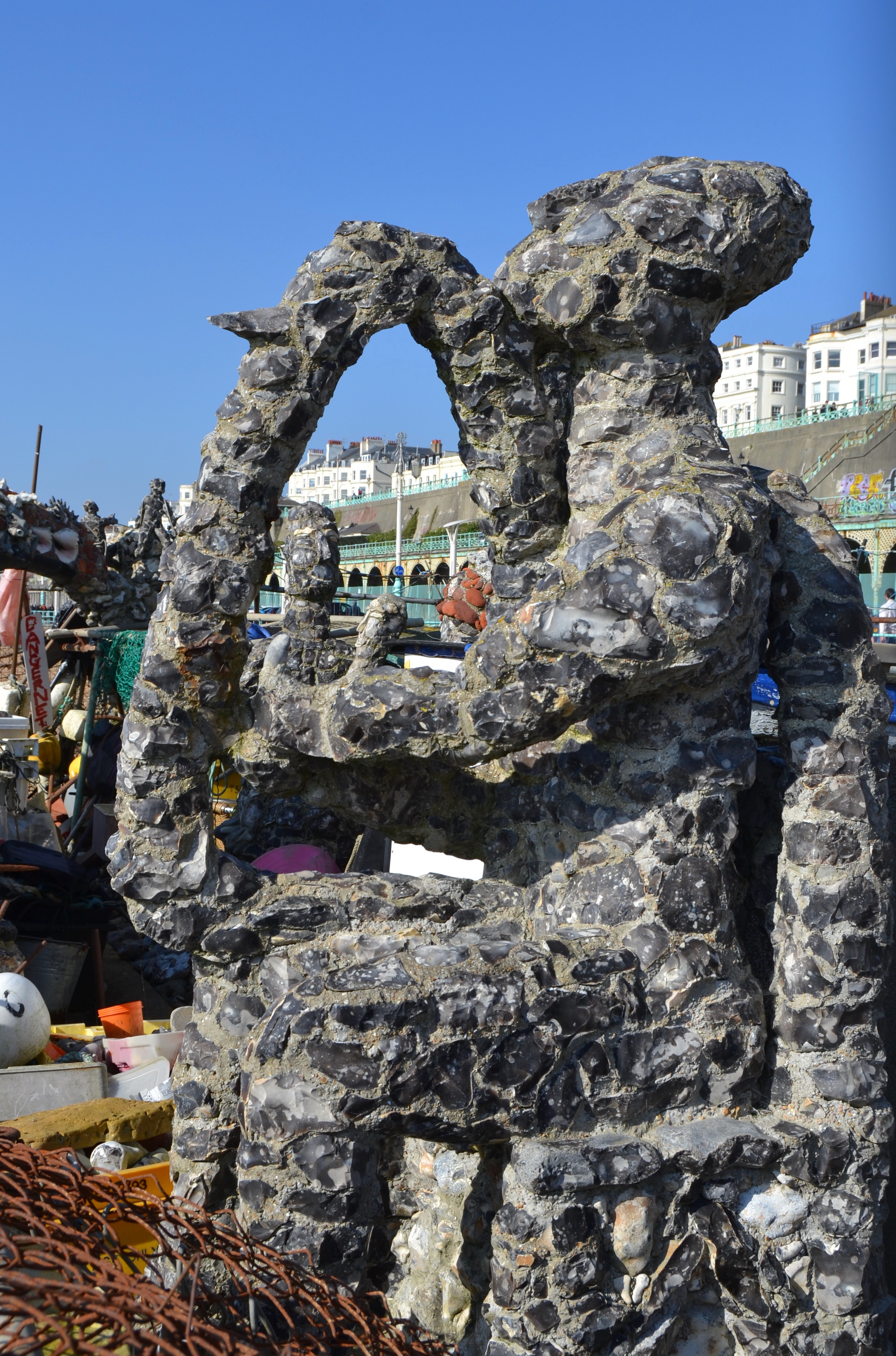
A Cycladic harpist

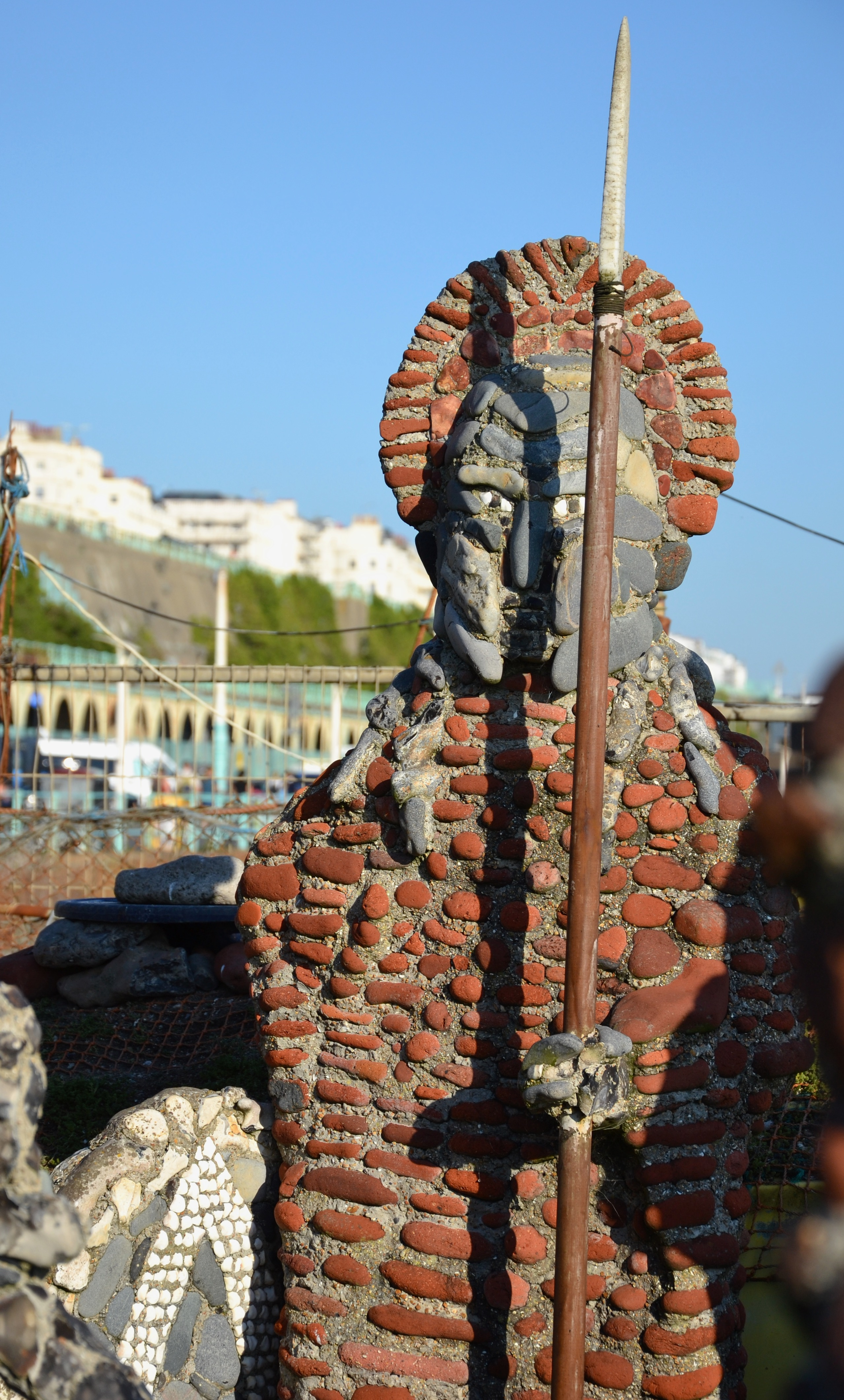
A Spartan commander
