= Kissing Coppers =

Artwork by Banksy

- Artist: Banksy
- Year: 2004
- Medium: Brick
- Location: Brighton
- Preceded by: Space Girl and Bird
- Followed by: Untitled
- Website: Banksy website

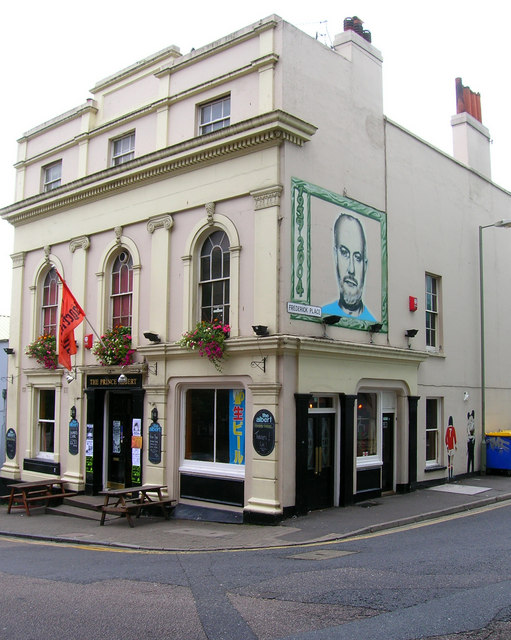
Prince Albert Pub. Kissing Coppers can be seen at street level to the far right (beside the blue dumpsters)

Kissing Coppers is a Banksy stencil that pictures two British policemen kissing. It was originally unveiled on the wall of The Prince Albert pub in Brighton in 2004. It gained significant attention due to Banksy's notoriety as a provocative street artist and activist. Kissing Coppers has frequently been regarded as one of Banksy’s most notable works, so much so that it was selected as the most iconic British piece of art at The Other Art Fair in London.

== Description ==
The two police officers are painted in black and white. Both individuals are shown in full uniform with evident handcuffs and a baton around their respective belts. This portrayal of same-sex intimacy is a common feature of art dating as far back as the 16th century in Michelangelo’s Sistine Ceiling.

Another significant element of Kissing Coppers is its strategic placement. Location is a crucial component of Banksy’s work as it oftentimes adds additional information concerning the message. This particular image was created in Brighton, England. Brighton is a lively city which has been referred to as the LGBTQ+ Capital of the UK. Approximately 11-15% of the seaside city are gay or bisexual. In addition, the city is home to the UK's largest pride celebration each year. Brighton’s rich history with the LGBTQ community dating as far back as the Napoleonic Wars in 1803, has allowed Kissing Coppers to become a cultural staple of the city and its unique population.

== Materials ==
Kissing Coppers is an example of stencil graffiti, which is a quick method for erecting images onto large surfaces, which for Banksy is necessary to keep his anonymity. Due to the speed and ease of stencil graffiti, it is typically the message rather than the critical artistic design components that are most significant to the work. Artists who practice stencil graffiti typically utilize easily recognizable figures placed in deliberate locations in a ploy to orient public attention and conversation to their intended political or social message. In this way, Guido Indij has remarked that stencil graffiti is not an art form in and of itself, but rather a political technique.

In Kissing Coppers, as well as many other Banksy pieces, iconic figures and images are not simply displayed, but rather deconstructed and juxtaposed into an atypical context oftentimes delivering a critique of an aspect of our society. In this way, graffiti has evolved tremendously from its origins of profane messages and slurs scribbled on buildings. Concerning the evolution and variation in street art, Banksy himself has remarked “Some of it will be pretty elaborate and some will just be a scrawl on a toilet wall.”

== Removal and sale ==
The evocative piece received considerable damage due to repeated vandalism. These attacks were indicative of the country's attitude toward homosexuality at the time with London police reporting a 28% increase in homophobic hate crimes over the previous four years as of 2011.

Due to the consistent damaging assaults to Kissing Coppers, Prince Albert Pub decided to have the piece removed and transferred to canvas, replacing it with a replica in 2008. The owner of the pub, Chris Steward, ultimately made the decision to sell the original. The sale occurred in February 2014 at an auction in Miami. It was sold for $575,000, which was considered relatively low based on previous estimates of it selling for closer to $700,000. The pub utilized the money from the sale to continue functioning in a competitive bar market.

There was considerable backlash resulting from the sale. Many argued against the Pub’s decision advocating that the removal of Kissing Coppers was not only a devastating loss for the vibrant community of Brighton, but also a hypocrisy to the purpose of street art. Banksy, as a widely known and admired artist, could easily just create and sell his work privately for considerable sums of money, but instead he continues to pursue public street art. Therefore, some scholars see it as a wrongdoing to privatize what is deliberately meant for the masses.

== Interpretations ==
Given the identity of Banksy is unknown, there is oftentimes significant speculation around the message behind his conceptions with Kissing Coppers being no exception. Primarily, scholars seem to disagree on whether the principal message of the work is one of advocation for the public acceptance of homosexuality or rather a simple mockery of authority and law enforcement officers. Those who believe the latter to be the case point to the way in which Banksy’s portrays other authority figures in his art. For example, similarly to Kissing Coppers, Banksy has created stencils depicting Queen Victoria as lesbian. According to this interpretation, Banksy simply uses homosexuality as an example of a common identity for which people are discriminated against to call into question the moral and societal authority of individuals such as policemen and the Queen. In contrast, other scholars view Kissing Coppers as a revolutionary piece of art that aims to normalize and cultivate an increased societal acceptance of homosexuality.

== See also ==
- List of works by Banksy
